= Institute for the Elderly and Social Services =

Spanish agency for social services

- Instituto de Mayores y Servicios Sociales

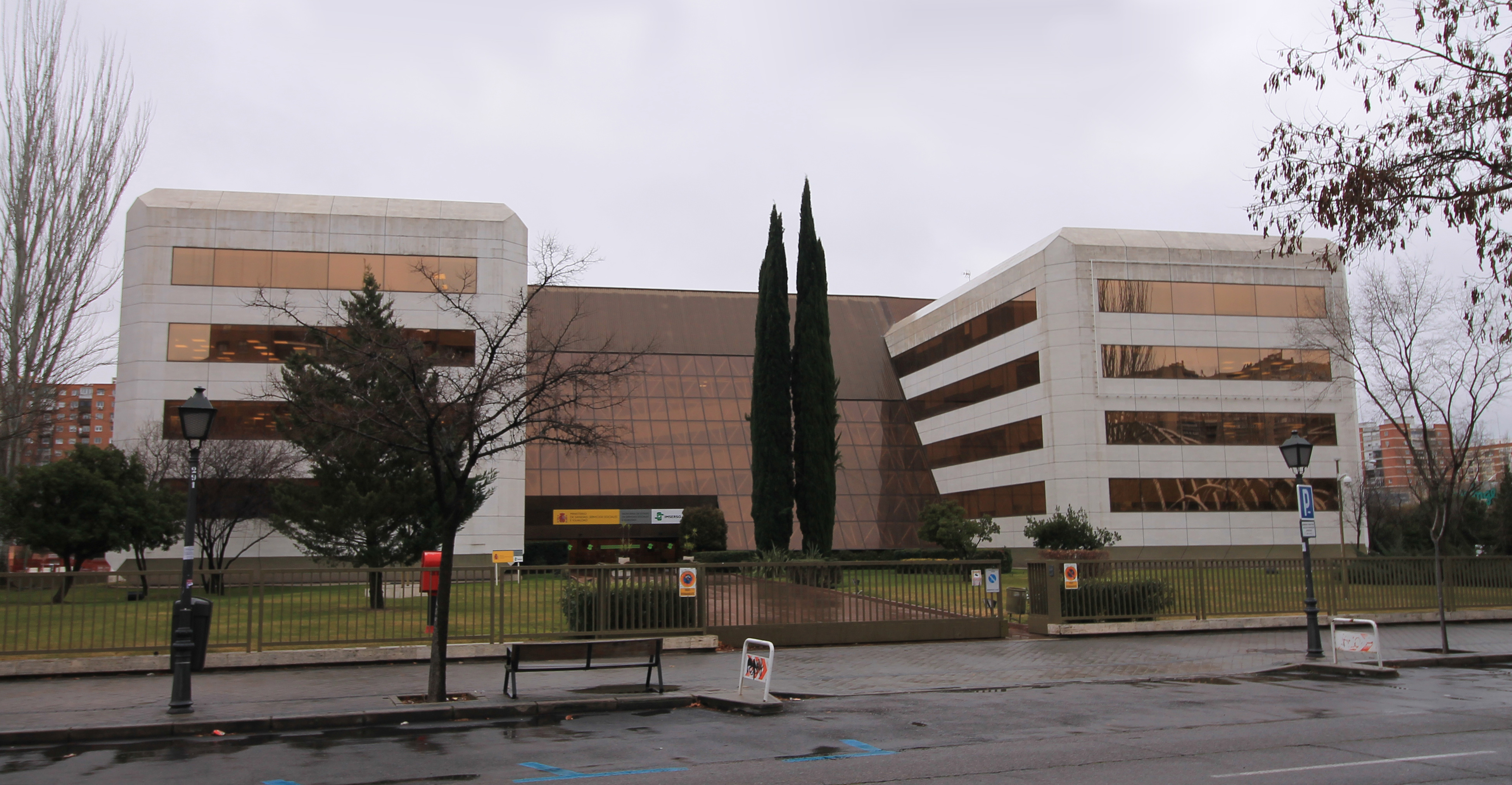
- IMSERSO headquarters in Madrid

Agency overview
- Formed: 16 November 1978; 47 years ago (as National Institute for Social Services); 2 July 2004 (as Institute for the Elderly and Social Services)
- Type: Management Entity of the Social Security
- Jurisdiction: Spanish government
- Headquarters: Madrid, Spain
- Employees: 2,034 (2018)
- Annual budget: € 5.3 billion (2021)
- Minister responsible: Pablo Bustinduy, Minister
- Agency executives: Rosa Martínez, Secretary of State for Social Services; María Teresa Sancho, Director-General
- Website: www.imserso.es

The Institute for the Elderly and Social Services (IMSERSO) is an agency of the Government of Spain responsible for the management of social services that complement the benefits of the Social Security System, disability and retirement pensions, in its non-contributory modalities, as well as the exercise of the powers of the General State Administration in matters relating the elderly and dependent persons. The IMSERSO is categorized as a "Management Entity of the Social Security".

Despite the large scope of work covered by the Institute, it is mostly known for its programs related to tourism and social thermalism for elderly. The main tourist destinations organized by IMSERSO are located within Spain, Portugal and Andorra. As of March 2019, the Institute provided services to almost 1.1 million people.

The Institute is headed by a Director-General appointed by the Minister for Social Rights and 2030 Agenda after hearing the Council of Ministers. The current director-general is Maria Teresa Sancho.

== History ==
Before of the creation of the Institute, it existed a protection and social services system with limited benefits, with no specialized institutions and personnel and very close to the private-religious fields.

The IMSERSO was created in 1978 under the name of National Institute for Social Services (INSERSO) by assuming the powers of the Recovery and Rehabilitation Service for the Physically and Psychically Handicapped of the Social Security (SEREM) and the Pension Assistance Service (SAP). Since its creation, many of the social assistance competencies have been decentralized, creating local social services in 1985 and regional services in 1988. It was during these period when the IMSERSO transferred to the Spanish regions its Residential Centers and Pensioners' Homes.

In 1997, due to the increase in migratory flows to Spain, and the increase in the immigrant population, the government delegated into the Institute the provision of social services to immigrants, renaming the agency to Institute for Migrations and Social Services (IMSERSO). In 2004, a second delegation of powers occurred, assuming the Institute the powers on elders, the social protection for dependent people and population aging. The Institute was renamed "Institute for the Elderly and Social Services" (Instituto de Mayores y Servicios Sociales).

In 2020, the agency was integrated in the Ministry of Social Rights and 2030 Agenda.

== Organization chart ==
Currently, the Institute for Elderly and Social Services is integrated in the Ministry of Health through the Secretariat of State for Social Services. It is headed by the Director-General who acts as the chief executive and it is mainly assisted by the Secretary-General.

The Institute' Regulation difference two types of bodies: management bodies and management control and monitoring bodies:

=== Management bodies ===
The management bodies are the Director-General, the Secretary-General and the Deputy Directors-General.

Director-General
The Director-General of the Institute is responsible for the planning, direction, control and inspection of its activities for the fulfillment of its purposes. The Director-General is appointed directly by the Minister responsible. From the Office of the Director-General depends a control unit of the Comptroller General's Office, the General Secretariat, and the Deputy Directorates-General for Planning, Ordination and Evaluation, for Management, and for Budget Analysis and Financial Management.

Secretary-General
The Secretary-General is the second-in-command to the Director-General and its appointment it is done through a public competition. The Secretary-General is responsible for the coordination of the Deputy-Directorates-General and the management of the domestic affairs (HR, buildings maintenance, relations with citizens and other administrations...). When the Director-General can't exercise its duties, the Secretary-General assumes the office.

Deputy Directorates-General
There are three deputy-directorates general: for Planning, Ordination and Evaluation, for Management and for Budget Analysis and Financial Management. The first two are responsible for the legal and administrative affairs of the Institute, the third one is responsible for all economic and budgetary matters. The deputy directors-general are chosen through a public competition.

=== Control bodies ===
The control and monitoring bodies are two: the General Council and the Executive Committee.

General Council
The General Council is responsible for preparing the lines of action of the Institute; preparing the preliminary draft budget, and approving the annual report. The General Council is integrated by thirty nine members representing the Spanish trade unions, business organizations and the General State Administration.

Executive Committee
The Executive Committee is a nine-member body headed by the Director-General of the Institute and integrated by representatives of the Spanish trade unions, business organizations and the State Administration. It is the responsibility of supervising and controlling the application of the resolutions of the General Council, as well as to propose as many measures as it deems necessary for the best fulfillment of the Institute's purposes.

== Directors ==
- Luis Santonja Peris (1979–1980)
- José Ramón Caso García (1980–1981)
- José Farré Morán (marzo 1981-diciembre 1981)
- Teresa Mendizábal Aracama (1981–1983)
- Patrocinio de las Heras Pinilla (1983–1985)
- Ángel Rodríguez Castedo (1985–1992)
- Héctor Maravall Gómez-Allende (1992–2000)
- Alberto Galerón de Miguel (2000–2002)
- Antonio Lis Darder (2002–2004)
- Ángel Rodríguez Castedo (2004–2007)
- Natividad Enjuto García (2007–2008)
- Pilar Rodríguez Rodríguez (2008–2010)
- Purificación Causapié Lopesino (2010–2012)
- César Antón Beltrán (2012–2016)
- Carmen Balfagón Lloreda (2016–2018)
- María del Carmen Orte Socias (2018–2020)
- Luis Alberto Barriga Martín (2020–)
