= Ministry of Consumer Affairs =

The Ministry of Consumer Affairs may refer to:

- Ministry of Consumer Affairs, Food and Public Distribution (India)
- Ministry of Domestic Trade and Consumer Affairs (Malaysia)
- Ministry of Consumer Affairs (New Zealand)
- Ministry of Consumer Affairs (Spain)
