= Ángeles Amador =

Spanish politician (born 1949)

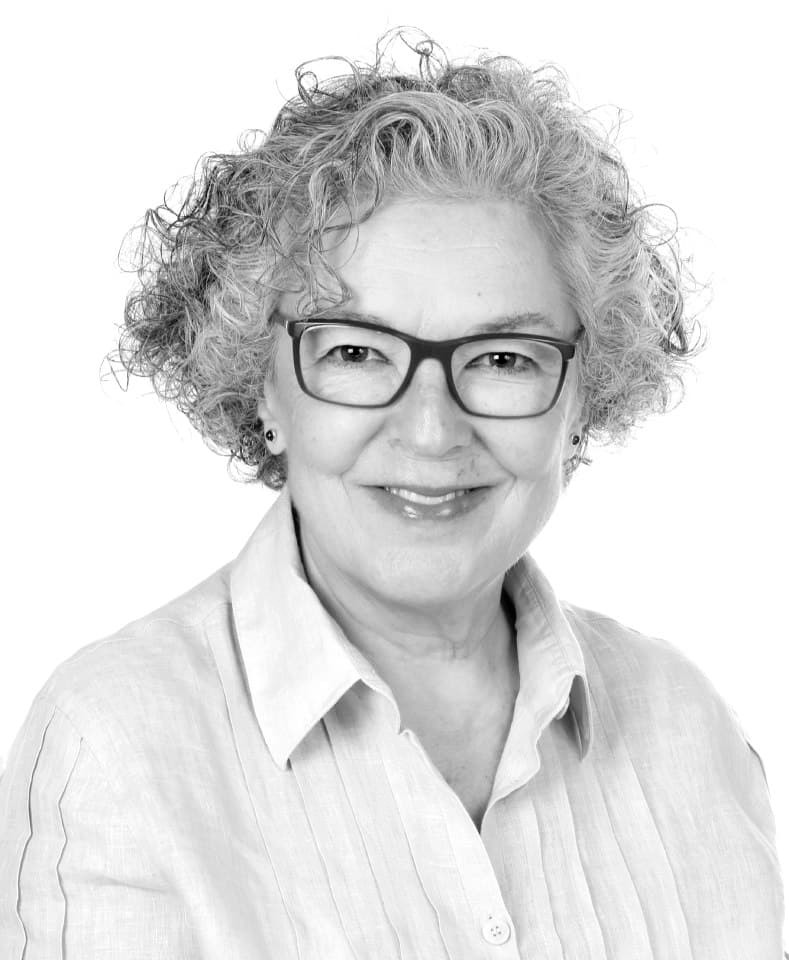

Minister of Health and Consumer Affairs
- In office 14 July 1993 – 6 May 1996
- Prime Minister: Felipe González
- Preceded by: José Antonio Griñán
- Succeeded by: José Manuel Romay Beccaría

Personal details
- Born: Ángeles Amador Millán; 10 October 1949 (age 76) Madrid, Spain
- Party: Spanish Socialist Workers' Party
- Children: Pablo Bustinduy
- Education: Complutense University of Madrid

Ángeles Amador Millán (born 10 October 1949) is a Spanish politician and lawyer. She served as Minister of Health and Consumer Affairs from July 1993 to May 1996. She has a son, Pablo Bustinduy, who went on to become a prominent figure as a Podemos politician.

== Early life and education ==
Amador was born in Madrid, Spain. She earned a law degree from Complutense University of Madrid and completed postgraduate studies at the University of Strasbourg and Harvard Law School, specializing in industrial property law.

== Career ==
=== Legal career ===
Amador began her career as a lawyer in 1973. Early on, she faced discrimination in the male-dominated legal profession. In 1982, she was elected to the Madrid Bar Association council.

=== Government Positions ===
In September 1986, she was appointed Secretary General Technical of the Ministry of Public Works and Urban Planning. In 1991, she became the Undersecretary of Health, becoming the first woman to hold this role.

As undersecretary, she focused on budgetary control in the health sector. She acknowledged delays and issues within the health system caused by financial constraints.

=== Contaminated Blood Scandal ===
In 1991, it was revealed that over 1,500 hemophiliacs had contracted HIV from contaminated blood products. Amador led negotiations with victims' associations, resulting in compensation agreements that included financial aid and monthly pensions for affected families.

=== Minister of Health ===
In July 1993, Amador was appointed Minister of Health and Consumer Affairs under Prime Minister Felipe González. She was the first woman to hold the position since 1936.

During her tenure, Amador identified hospital waiting lists as a primary issue in the healthcare system. She oversaw a reform that introduced a catalog of health services eligible for public reimbursement, excluding treatments without proven clinical benefits. However, her policies were met with resistance, particularly from medical professionals and trade unions, who opposed limitations on salaries and working conditions.

Amador also introduced reforms that allowed patients more flexibility in choosing their general practitioners and specialists within the public system.

=== Social Conflicts and Strikes ===
Amador's tenure was marked by significant social conflicts. In 1995, hospital doctors initiated a prolonged strike demanding better wages and conditions. Despite opposition, the government held firm on its position, leading to an eventual agreement with moderate salary increases tied to productivity.

=== Later career ===
Amador was elected to the Congress of Deputies in 1996, representing Segovia. As a member of parliament, she became the Socialist Party’s spokesperson for health policy, defending public healthcare and opposing privatization efforts. She remained in parliament until 2002, after which she distanced herself from the party's leadership and resigned.

Following her political career, Amador returned to legal practice. She also joined the board of Red Eléctrica de España in 2005, becoming the first woman to sit on the board of a major Spanish electricity company. She served in this role until 2017.

== Personal life ==
Amador was married to Javier Bustinduy, an executive in the transport sector, until his death in 2016. She has three children, one of whom, Pablo Bustinduy, became the Spanish Minister of Social Rights in 2023.
