= Pablo Bustinduy =

Spanish politician (born 1983)

The Most Excellent Pablo Bustinduy
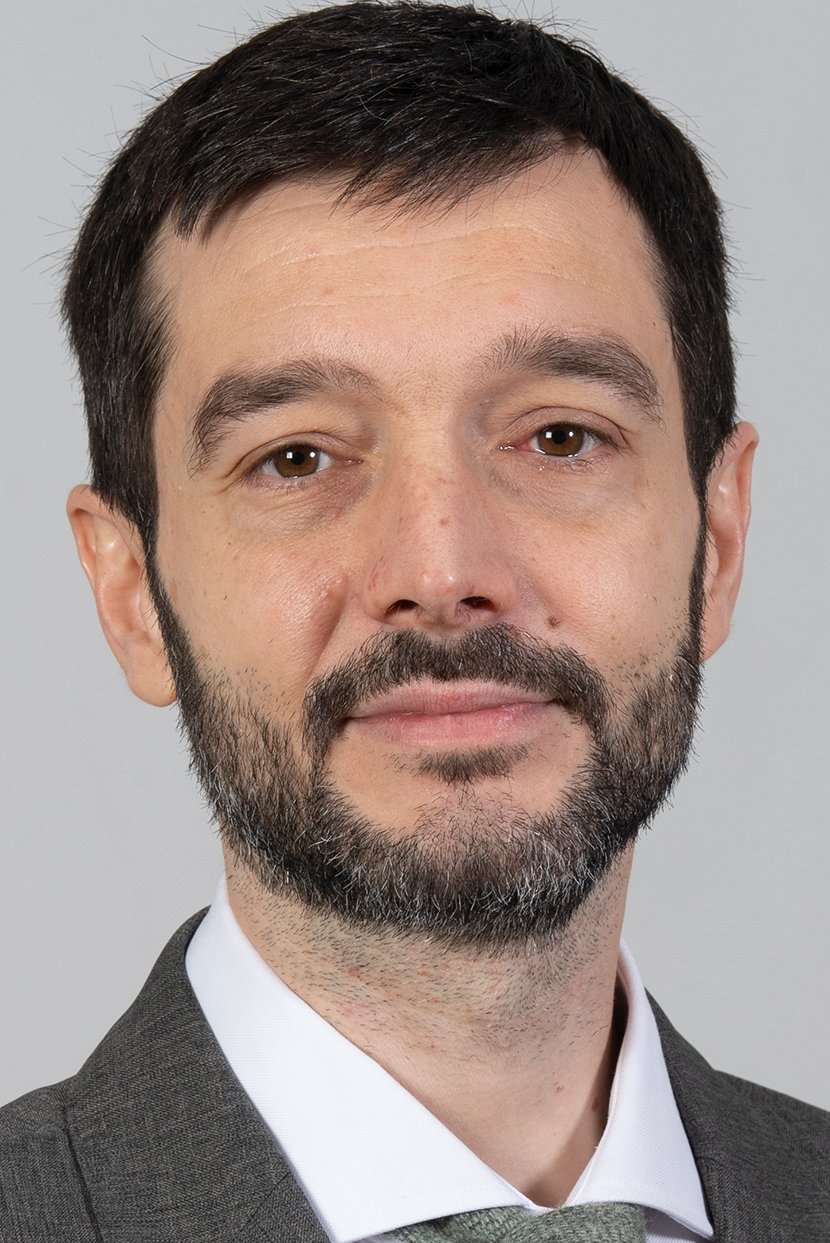
- Official portrait, 2023

Minister of Social Rights, Consumer Affairs and 2030 Agenda
- Incumbent
- Assumed office 21 November 2023
- Prime Minister: Pedro Sánchez
- Preceded by: Ione Belarra (Social Rights and 2030 Agenda; Alberto Garzón (Consumer Affairs)

Member of the Congress of Deputies
- In office 13 January 2016 – 21 May 2019
- Constituency: Madrid

Personal details
- Born: 19 March 1983 (age 43) Madrid, Spain
- Party: Independent (linked to Movimiento Sumar since 2023)
- Other political affiliations: Podemos (2014–2019)
- Parent(s): Ángeles Amador (mother); Javier Bustinduy (father)
- Occupation: Politician · professor

Pablo Bustinduy Amador (pronounced [ˈpaβlo βustinˈduj]; born 1983) is a Spanish political scientist and politician. Formerly a member of Podemos, he is now linked with Sumar. He has been member of the 11th and 12th Congress of Deputies, representing Madrid.

== Biography ==
Born in Madrid on 19 March 1983, he is son of Ángeles Amador, minister of Health during the Felipe González Government, and Javier Bustinduy, former director of Renfe and Metro de Madrid. He graduated in Political and Administration Sciences at the Complutense University of Madrid. He finished his PhD in Philosophy at the New School for Social Research. He lived 8 years in New York, where he taught Philosophy at St. Francis College, Fairfield University and the State University of New York between 2010 and 2013, he returned to Spain in order to help in the Podemos campaign for the 2014 European Parliament election. He became responsible for the party's international relations.

He ran as a candidate in the Podemos list in Madrid for the 2015 general election, and was elected a member of the Congress of Deputies. He was re-elected in the 2016 general election. He has served as spokesman for his parliamentary group in the Commission of Foreign Affairs of the Congress of Deputies. In November 2018, Bustinduy won the primaries to lead his party list in the 2019 European Parliament election, pending later mergings with other parties notwithstanding.

In March 2019 Bustinduy renounced his position at the head of the Unidas Podemos list vis-à-vis the 2019 European Parliament election. Bustinduy and Podemos announced María Eugenia Rodríguez Palop—described as a "political and moral mainstay" by Bustinduy—would assume his place.

== Political positions ==
A convinced europeanist, Bustinduy supports both the European Union and the euro. He is opposed to the TTIP. He sided with Íñigo Errejón in the context of the candidacy of the latter during the 2017 Podemos primaries in the 2nd Congress of the party.
