= Spanish Agency of Medicines and Medical Devices =

Government agency in Spain

- Agencia Española de Medicamentos y Productos Sanitarios

Agency overview
- Formed: December 30, 1997; 28 years ago
- Jurisdiction: Spain
- Headquarters: Parque Empresarial Las Mercedes, Calle Campezo 1, Madrid, Spain
- Employees: 524 (2019)
- Annual budget: € 85.5 million, 2023
- Agency executives: Faustino Blanco González, President; María Jesús Lamas Díaz, Director
- Parent agency: Ministry of Health
- Website: www.aemps.gob.es

The Spanish Agency of Medicines and Medical Devices (Spanish: Agencia Española de Medicamentos y Productos Sanitarios; AEMPS) is a regulatory and autonomous agency of the Government of Spain that acts as the highest sanitary authority in the country in terms of medical safety on medicines, health products, cosmetics and personal care products.

The agency is responsible for the regulation and authorization of clinical trials and the commercialization of sanitary products for human use, the planification and evaluation of those products along with the European Medicines Agency (EMA); the authorization of clinical laboratories, develop the specific rules to ensure the quality of the medical products and inspect all sanitary products of the central government competence. Since 1998, the agency has powers over the control, evaluation and authorization of animal health products.

The agency was created under the name of Agencia Española del Medicamento by the Fiscal, Administrative and Social Order Measures Act of 1997 and its powers were extended (to fields such as veterinary drugs) by another law of the same name from 1998 and by the Cohesion and Quality of the National Health System Act of 2003. The statute of the agency was approved in 1999. It was renamed as Agencia Española de Medicamentos y Productos Sanitarios in August 2003. It depends directly from the Ministry of Health.

The agency is chaired by a President and a Vice President. Both officials are Under Secretaries of the Ministry of Health and Agriculture. The real chief executive of the agency is the Director.

== Organization chart ==
The agency is divided in six type of bodies: Governing bodies, executive bodies, control committees, administrative bodies, supporting bodies and complementary bodies.

- Governing bodies:
  - President. It's the Secretary-General for Health, with the rank of Under Secretary.
  - Vice President. It's the Secretary-General for Agriculture and Food, with the rank of Under Secretary.
  - Governing Board.
    - Control Committee.
- Executive Body.
  - Director.
    - Support body to the executive body.
    - Administrative bodies.
      - General Secretariat.
      - Department for Drug Inspection and Control
      - Department for Medicinal Products for Human Use
      - Department for Health Products
      - Department for Veterinary Drugs
- Complementary bodies. It is a series of organs made up of experts in specific subjects.
  - Medicinal Products for Human Use Committee
  - Safety of Medicinal Products for Human Use Committee
  - Veterinary Medicines Committee
  - Veterinary Medicines Safety Committee
  - Technical Committee of the Spanish Pharmacovigilance System for Medicinal Products for Human Use
  - Post-authorization Studies Coordination Committee
  - Technical Committee of the Spanish Pharmacovigilance System for Veterinary Drugs
  - Veterinary Medicines Availability Committee
  - Pharmacopoeia Committee and the National Formulary
  - Technical Inspection Committee
  - Coordination Committee of Peripheral Pharmaceutical Services
  - Health Products Committee
  - Expert Network Committee.

== See also ==
- Health care in Spain
- Spanish National Health System
- Pharmacoepidemiology
