= Catalan Food Safety Agency =

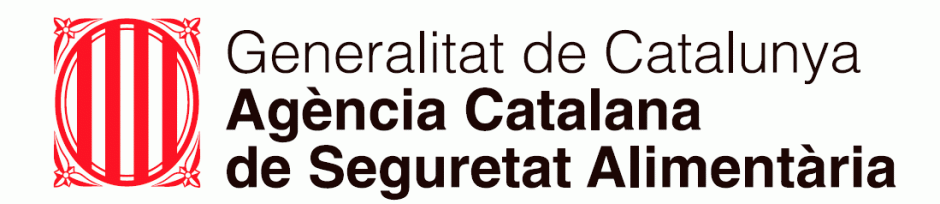
- Company type: Government agency
- Industry: Food safety
- Founded: 2002
- Headquarters: Barcelona, Catalonia
- Area served: Catalonia
- Key people: Eduard Mata
- Website: www.gencat.cat/salut/acsa/

The Catalan Food Safety Agency (Agència Catalana de Seguretat Alimentària - ACSA) is specialized area of the Catalan Public Health Agency (Agència de Salut Pública de Catalunya - ASPCAT) of the Generalitat de Catalunya, which aims to achieve the highest level of food safety in Catalonia through planning and supporting control actions, collaborating and cooperating with different administrations, and sectors whose activity affects, directly or indirectly, on food safety.

== Overview ==
The Agency is participated by the departments of Health, Agriculture, Food and Rural Action, Environment and Housing and the Consumers Agency, all of which have competence in the various aspects related to food safety, thereby enabled with a transversal character.

The creation of the ACSA is part of the evolving global food safety organization in the European Union which covers the entire food chain, from agricultural production to the final food products available to consumers, and involves all operators responsible for food safety as well as competent authorities responsible to ensure a high level of health and safety of the population.

== Activities ==
The Catalan Agency for Food Safety executes the following functions:

- Evaluation and reporting of health risks associated with food, in collaboration with the Spanish Agency for Food Safety and Nutrition (AESAN) and the European Food Safety Authority (EFSA).
- Support the coordination of the actions of the Catalan government in matters of food safety.
- Promote collaboration between public administrations, universities and research centres, industry and consumer organizations and users.

== See also ==
- Food Administration
