= Ministry of Social Affairs (Spain) =

Spanish ministry responsible for social affairs

Ministry of Social Rights, Consumer Affairs and 2030 Agenda
- Ministerio de Derechos Sociales, Consumo y Agenda 2030

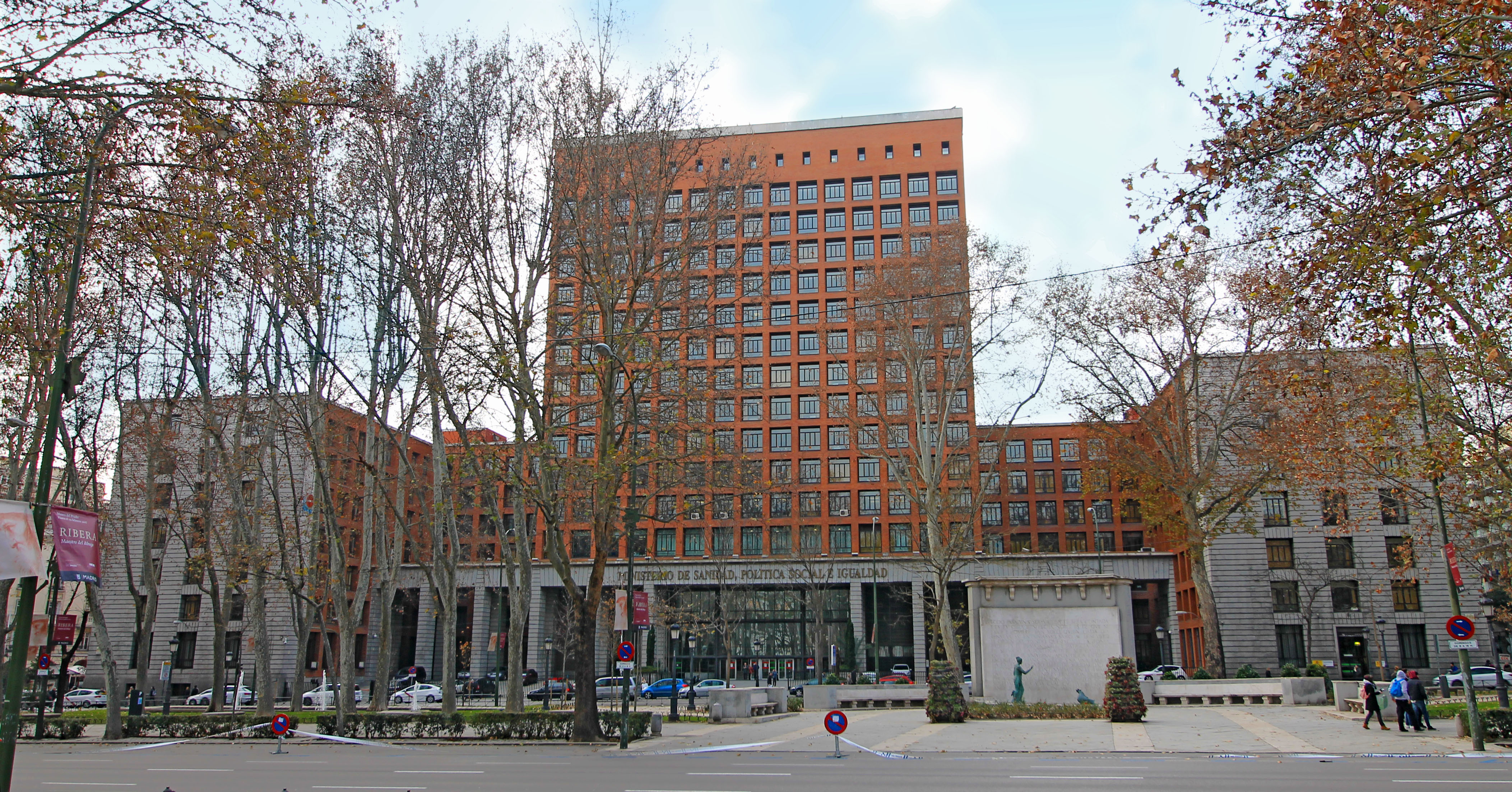
- Headquarters of the Ministry

Agency overview
- Formed: 12 July 1988 (as "Ministry of Social Affairs"); 21 November 2023 (as "Ministry of Social Rights, Consumer Affairs and 2030 Agenda")
- Preceding agencies: Ministry of Labour and Social Security (before 1988) (social services and migration); Ministry of Culture (before 1988) (youth and women); Ministry of Justice (before 1988) (minors protection); Ministry of Health, Consumer Affairs and Social Welfare (before 2020) (social servicies); Ministry of Consumer Affairs (before 2023)
- Superseding agency: Ministry of Labour and Social Affairs (after 1996)
- Type: Ministry
- Jurisdiction: Government of Spain
- Headquarters: Casa Sindical, Madrid
- Employees: 3,568 (2024)
- Annual budget: € 1.8 billion, 2023
- Minister responsible: Pablo Bustinduy
- Agency executives: Rosa Martínez, Secretary of State for Social Rights; Andrés Barragán, Secretary-General for Consumer Affairs and Gambling; Elisa Darias Valenciano, Under-Secretary
- Website: www.dsca.gob.es

The Ministry of Social Affairs, since 2023 known as Ministry of Social Rights, Consumer Affairs and 2030 Agenda, is a department of the Government of Spain responsible for designing and implementing government policies on social services and welfare, families and disabilities. It is also responsible for animal welfare—except bullfighting—, consumer protection, gambling regulation and UN Sustainable Development Goals.

The department was first created in 1988, but was abolished in 1996. Subsequently, in 2020 it was recreated, and it exists today. The current minister is Pablo Bustinduy, who was appointed on 21 November 2023.

== History ==
For centuries, Spain has had a number of social services to help the most disadvantaged, but these have mostly been private and closely linked to the Catholic Church.

The evolution and growing importance of this social aspect meant that, during the 19th century, the State assumed guardianship over those establishments dedicated to charity, with the Ministry of the Interior playing a prominent role in this task, having jurisdiction over "houses of mercy and charity" since its founding.

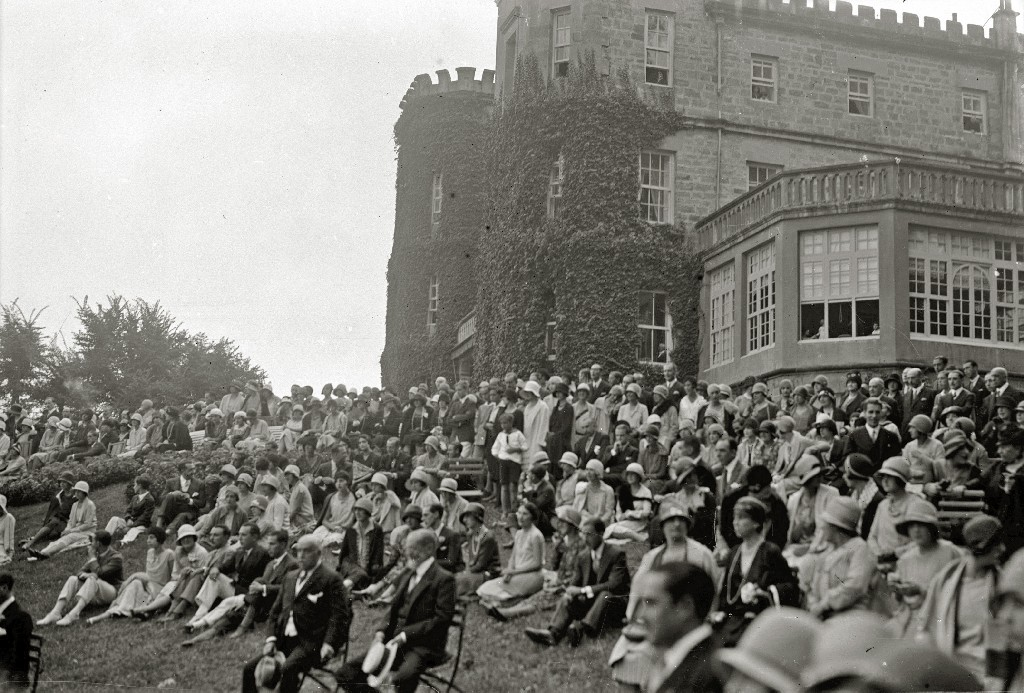
Charity party in San Sebastián (Gipuzkoa) in 1928

From the 1840s onwards, these policies became institutionalized around the Directorate-General for Charity (today known as Directorate-General for Family Diversity and Social Services), created in 1847 within the Ministry of the Interior.

These responsibilities remained in this department until 1977, when they were transferred to the Ministry of Labour. Almost immediately they were transferred to the Ministry of Health and Social Security and, in 1981, they returned to the Ministry of Labour until 1988.

=== First period (1988–1996) ===
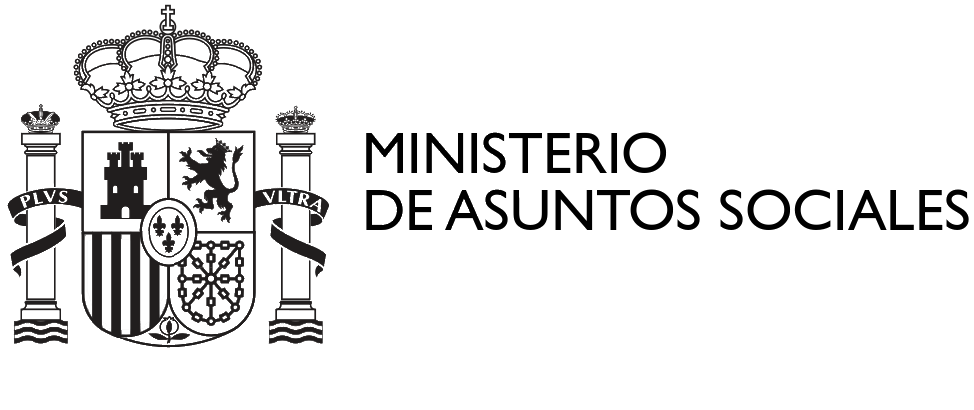
Department's logo from 1988 to 1996.

From the 1980s onwards, the concept of "charity" gradually lost ground to others like "social action" and "social services" and, in 1988, during the premiership of Felipe González, this department was created for the first time, under the name "Ministry of Social Affairs".

During its first period of life, the department assumed powers relating to social services, equality, minors protection and prevention of youth crime, adoptions and foster care and the promotion of cultural communication and youth association. Likewise, the department was responsible for the management of the social programs derived from funds obtained through the personal income tax and in its later years from the government migration policy.

This new ministry assumed the responsibilities of up to three ministerial departments, namely:

- Those that the Ministry of Labour and Social Security and the National Institute of Social Services had in matters of social services and social action.
- Those that the Ministry of Culture had, through the Institute of Women and the Institute of Youth.
- Those that the Ministry of Justice had through the Directorate-General for Legal Protection of Minors.

In 1990, Social Affairs Offices were established in the Government Delegations. In 1993 they were merged into the Provincial Directorates of Labour, Social Security and Social Affairs.

That same year, 1993, the department's scope of authority was expanded, assuming the immigration functions of the Ministry of Labour and those previously carried out by the Ministry of Health and Consumer Affairs through the Government Delegation for the National Drugs Plan. Just five months later, the National Drugs Plan was transferred to the Ministry of the Interior to unify the ministry's anti-drug policy, not only in terms of repression, but also to ensure prevention and rehabilitation.

In 1996, the new prime minister José María Aznar abolished the department and transferred its competences to the Ministry of Labour and Social Affairs.

=== Two decades without an independent ministry (1996–2020) ===
The government structure established by Aznar was maintained during his two terms and the first term of José Luis Rodríguez Zapatero.

However, starting with Zapatero's second government, the responsibilities previously held by the Department of Social Affairs underwent numerous changes. Firstly, in 2008, the bulk of these responsibilities, now under the title of "Social Policy", were integrated into the Ministry of Education, while those related to equality were split in a new department, the Ministry of Equality. Secondly, a year later, the former were transferred from Education to the Ministry of Health, and in 2010, the Department of Equality was abolished, its policies downgraded to the rank of a State Secretariat, and similarly transferred to the Ministry of Health. Thus, all Social Affairs responsibilities were grouped under the Ministry of Health until 2020 (except for Equality, which was briefly under the Ministry of the Presidency).

=== Second period (since 2020) ===
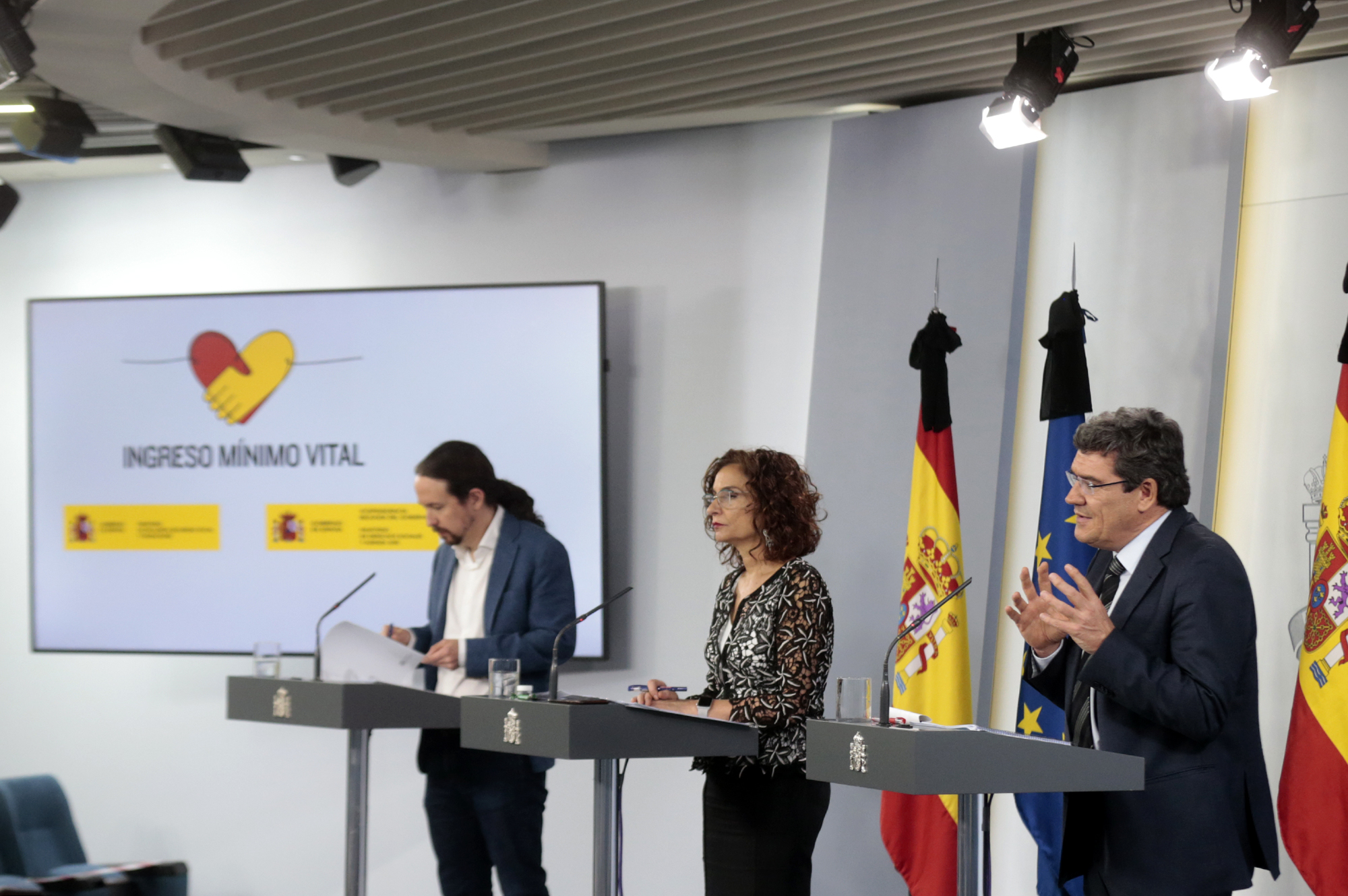
The ministers of Social Rights, Finance and Social Security, at the press conference following the extraordinary Council of Ministers meeting that approved the minimum living income in 2020

With the formation of the second government of Pedro Sánchez and the necessary coalition government with Unidas Podemos that supported it, the government agreement led to the creation of new ministries, among which the recovery of two old departments stood out: Social Affairs, now called the "Ministry of Social Rights and Agenda 2030", with powers over social services, childhood, youth, families, disability and policies related to the 2030 Agenda; and Equality, with powers over all types of equality, prevention of discrimination and gender violence.

At this stage, and as a consequence of the effects derived from the COVID-19 pandemic, the government approved what it called a "social shield", a series of measures to mitigate these effects. Among these measures, a minimum living income stands out, promoted by the Ministry of Inclusion, Social Security and Migration with the participation of this department, as well as measures aimed at guaranteeing basic services and reducing the elements of vulnerability, through measures such as the suspension of electricity cuts or the suspension of evictions, among others.

Following the government reshuffle of November 2023, the Ministry of Social Rights acquired the consumer affairs and gambling policies of the abolished Ministry of Consumer Affairs.

== Organization ==
Organizational chart of the Spanish Ministry of Social Rights, February 2024

The minister of social rights, consumer affairs and 2030 agenda, a member of the Council of Ministers, is the most senior official of the department. The minister is responsible for establishing the government policy on these areas and appointing the government officials responsible for implementing it.

In this regard, the minister is assisted by a secretary of state for social rights, who manages the government social policy and a secretary-general, with the rank of under-secretary, for consumer and gambling affairs. In addition, the ministry has an under-secretary, the most senior civil servant of the department and the official responsible for assisting the minister in the daily management of the ministry.

As of 2026, this is the organization of the Ministry:

Ministry Organization (2026)
| Minister | Cabinet |
| Minister | Directorate-General for the 2030 Agenda |
| Minister | Royal Disability Board |
| Secretary of State for Social Rights | Directorate-General for Disability Support Policies |
| Secretary of State for Social Rights | Directorate-General for Family Diversity and Social Services |
| Secretary of State for Social Rights | Directorate-General for Animal Rights |
| Secretary of State for Social Rights | Institute for the Elderly and Social Services |
| Secretary-General for Consumer Affairs and Gambling | Directorate-General for Consumer Affairs |
| Secretary-General for Consumer Affairs and Gambling | Directorate-General for Gambling Regulation |
| Secretary-General for Consumer Affairs and Gambling | Spanish Agency for Food Safety and Nutrition |
| Under-Secretary | Technical General Secretariat |
| Under-Secretary | Deputy Directorate-General for Economic and Budgetary Management |
| Under-Secretary | Administrative Office |
| Under-Secretary | Deputy Directorate-General for Human Resources and Inspection of Services |
| Under-Secretary | ICT Division |

== Headquarters ==
In the two stages in which the Department for Social Affairs has existed (1988–1996 and since 2020), it has been located at numbers 18 and 20 of the Paseo del Prado, a large building called the "Casa Sindical" (Spanish: Trade Unions House), today known for housing the Ministry of Health and which previously housed the National Delegation of Trade Unions.

== Budget ==
In millions of euros (€)
1. Social services 471.6 (81.5%)
2. Consumer affairs 49.5 (8.55%)
3. Central services 33 (5.70%)
4. 2030 Agenda 24.6 (4.25%)

For fiscal year 2026, the Ministry of Social Rights, Consumer Affairs and 2030 Agenda has a consolidated budget of €578.8 million. The ministerial budget includes a Programme 000X (“Internal Transfers and Disbursements”), which is part of the budget of the Institute for the Elderly and Social Services.

The budget can be divided in four main areas:

1. Central services (Program 239N & 498M), which funds the Ministry’s central services and administrative structure.
2. Social services (231F, 231G & 232F), covering covering social policy, family and childhood programmes, and animal welfare.
3. Consumer affairs (313C, 492O & 496M), which finance the government policy on consumer protection, food safety and gambling regulation.
4. 2030 Agenda (921Y), aimed at promoting the implementation of the Sustainable Development Goals (SDG) in Spain

In addition, Programme 000X (“Internal Transfers and Disbursements”) is excluded from the analysis, as it consists of transfers between public sector entities and would otherwise lead to double counting and distort the overall budget. It includes transfers to the Institute for the Elderly and Social Services to fund its activities; however, these are accounted for within the Social Security budget.

=== Audit ===
The Ministry's accounts, as well as those of its agencies, are internally audited by the Office of the Comptroller General of the State (IGAE), through a Delegated Comptroller's Office within the Department itself. However, everything related to the Institute for the Elderly and Social Services, which is a Social Security management entity, is audited internally by the Office of the Comptroller General of the Social Security, which is functionally dependent on the IGAE. Externally, the Court of Auditors is responsible for auditing expenditures.

Likewise, the Congress of Deputies Committee on Labour, Social Economy, Inclusion, Social Security and Migration and the Senate Committee on Inclusion, Social Security and Migration, exercise political control over the accounts.

== List of officeholders ==
Office name:

- Ministry of Social Affairs (1988–1996)
- Ministry of Social Rights and 2030 Agenda (2020–2023)
- Ministry of Social Rights, Consumer Affairs and 2030 Agenda (2023–present)

| Portrait | Name (Birth–Death) | Term of office | | | Party | Government | Prime Minister (Tenure) | Ref. |
| Portrait | Name (Birth–Death) | Took office | Left office | Duration | Party | Government | Prime Minister (Tenure) | Ref. |
|---|---|---|---|---|---|---|---|---|
| | Matilde Fernández (born 1950) | 23 July 1988 | 7 December 1989 | 4 years and 356 days | PSOE | González II | Felipe González (1982–1996) | |
| | Matilde Fernández (born 1950) | 7 December 1989 | 14 July 1993 | 4 years and 356 days | PSOE | González III | Felipe González (1982–1996) | |
| | Cristina Alberdi (1946–2024) | 14 July 1993 | 6 May 1996 | 2 years and 297 days | PSOE | González IV | Felipe González (1982–1996) | |
Office disestablished during this interval. (Note: The department's competences were transferred to the Ministry of Labour and Social Affairs between 1996 and 2008, to the Ministry of Education, Social Policy and Sports between 2008 and 2009, to the Ministry of Health and Social Policy between 2009 and 2010, to the Ministry of Health, Social Policy and Equality between 2010 and 2011, to the Minister of Health, Social Services and Equality between 2011 and 2018 and to the Ministry of Health, Consumer Affairs and Social Welfare between 2018 and 2020.)
| | Pablo Iglesias (born 1978) | 13 January 2020 | 31 March 2021 | 1 year and 77 days | Podemos | Sánchez II | Pedro Sánchez (2018–present) | |
| | Ione Belarra (born 1987) | 31 March 2021 | 21 November 2023 | 2 years and 235 days | Podemos | Sánchez II | Pedro Sánchez (2018–present) | |
| | Pablo Bustinduy (born 1983) | 21 November 2023 | Incumbent | 2 years and 261 days | Independent | Sánchez III | Pedro Sánchez (2018–present) | |
