= Rafael Aburto =

Spanish architect (1913–2014)

- Born: Rafael Aburto Renovales; 2 November 1913; Neguri, Vizcaya
- Died: 9 March 2014 (aged 100); Madrid, Spain
- Occupation: Architect

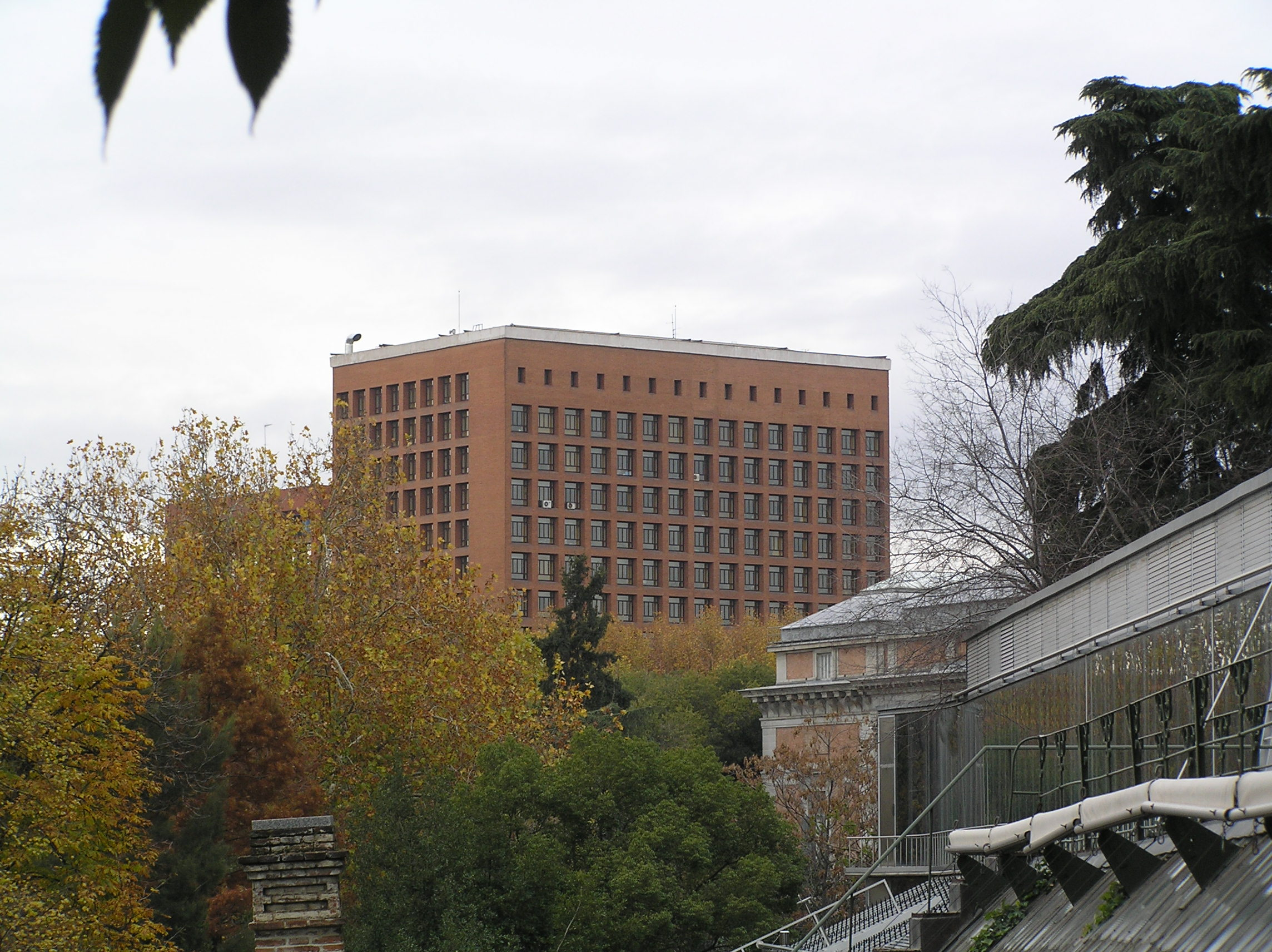
Spanish Ministry of Health and Consumption (Madrid), work of Francisco de Asis Cabrero, 1949.

Rafael Aburto Renovales (2 November 1913 – 9 March 2014) was a Spanish architect. His most famous works are Casa Sindical de Madrid and Obra Sindical del Hogar. Aburto helped organize the Council of Spanish Architectural Associations. Aburto was born in Neguri, Vizcaya, Spain. He studied at Madrid School of Architecture. He turned 100 in November 2013 and died of natural causes in Madrid, aged 100.

== Biography ==
He was born on November 2, 1913, in Getxo, Vizcaya. He came from a middle-class family in Neguri, a neighborhood in the town of Guecho in Vizcaya. He moved to Madrid in 1930 to prepare for admission to the Higher Technical School of Architecture of Madrid, which he achieved in 1935. During his time as a student, which lasted until 1943, he formed ties with those who would later become, like him, key figures in the transformation of Spanish architecture: Asís Cabrero, Miguel Fisac, and Josep Antoni Coderch, in particular.

Before completing his studies, he began his collaboration with the Obra Sindical del Hogar (OSH), which would last three decades. He won second prize in the competition for the new Chamartín Stadium in 1944, and another in the competition for the Winter Sports Palace in Barcelona in 1947. A clear example of postwar classicism was his Monument to the Counter-Reformation in 1948, with surrealist undertones and Asís Cabrero as a collaborator, and above all, one of the great works marking the transition to modernism. Before winning the prize in 1949 for the building of the National Trade Union Delegation in Madrid, better known as the Casa Sindical—an award shared with Asís Cabrero—he had already won second prize in the competition for the new Chamartín Stadium in 1944, and another in the competition for the Winter Sports Palace in Barcelona in 1947. In addition, he won a joint first prize in the competition for the Monument to the Fallen in Madrid in 1949, and second prize in the competition for the Basilica of Aránzazu in 1950. This is reflected in some of his domestic works, such as the experimental housing in Villaverde (Madrid) or the Marcelo Usera complex. Around the same time, he also adopted a modern style evident in his two cathedral designs: the one for Madrid in 1950, in collaboration with Cabrero, and the one submitted for the San Salvador competition in 1953. An obsession with filling the planes that compose the space—decorative and pictorial in nature—almost entirely defines the 1953 Niágara American Bowling Alley. But this pictorialism also played a role in other works, such as the Diario Pueblo building in 1959. However, it was really in the Neguri housing project in 1966 that his work truly became pictorial.

He played a prominent role in the architecture conference held in Granada, which culminated in the Alhambra Manifesto. In the second half of the 1960s, Aburto served for seven years as a professor of design at the Higher Technical School of Architecture of Madrid.

He died in Madrid on March 9, 2014.
