= José Manuel Romay Beccaría =

Spanish politician and jurist

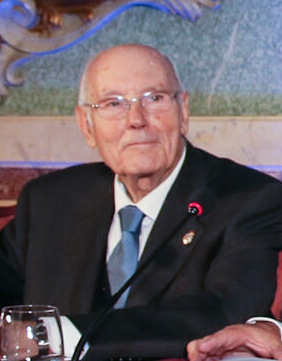

69th and 71st President of the Council of State
- In office 3 May 2012 – 5 July 2018
- Preceded by: Francisco Rubio Llorente
- Succeeded by: María Teresa Fernández de la Vega
- In office 25 December 2002 – 19 April 2004
- Preceded by: Íñigo Cavero
- Succeeded by: Francisco Rubio Llorente

Senator
- In office 29 November 2011 – 2 May 2012
- Constituency: Parliament of Galicia

Minister of Health and Consumer Affairs
- In office 6 May 1996 – 27 April 2000
- Preceded by: Ángeles Amador
- Succeeded by: Celia Villalobos

Vice President of Galicia
- In office 22 January 1982 – 7 January 1983
- President: Xerardo Fernández Albor
- Preceded by: office established
- Succeeded by: José Luis Barreiro

Member of the Congress of Deputies
- In office 12 March 2000 – 3 January 2003
- Constituency: A Coruña
- In office 28 October 1982 – 13 February 1990
- Constituency: A Coruña

Personal details
- Born: José Manuel Romay Beccaría; 18 January 1934 (age 92) Betanzos, A Coruña, Spain
- Party: People's Party (since 1989)
- Other political affiliations: People's Alliance (until 1989)
- Education: University of Santiago de Compostela

José Manuel Romay Beccaría (born 18 January 1934) is a Spanish lawyer and politician. During his political life, he has been regional minister in several occasions in the Regional Government of Galicia, Member of the Congress of Deputies and Senator. The highest and most important offices that he held were Health Minister of Spain and two times President of the Council of State.

== Career ==
Born in Betanzos, Romay was trained as a lawyer at the University of Santiago de Compostela, where he later taught. He became a lawyer for the Spanish Council of State in 1959. Romay was first elected to the Congress of Deputies from A Coruña in 1982. He stepped down in 1990 after his second consecutive term to return to the Xunta de Galicia as an adviser and minister, in which he had first served as vice president between 1982 and 1983. Romay returned to the national government in 1996, accepting an appointment as health minister.

In 2000, Romay began his second stint in the Congress of Deputies, again representing A Coruña.

In 2002, he became president of the Council of State. He was succeeded by Francisco Rubio Llorente in 2004. Romay was appointed to the senate between 2011 and 2012 by the parliament of Galicia. That same year, Romay was named president of the Council of State for the second time.
