= Francisco Rubio Llorente =

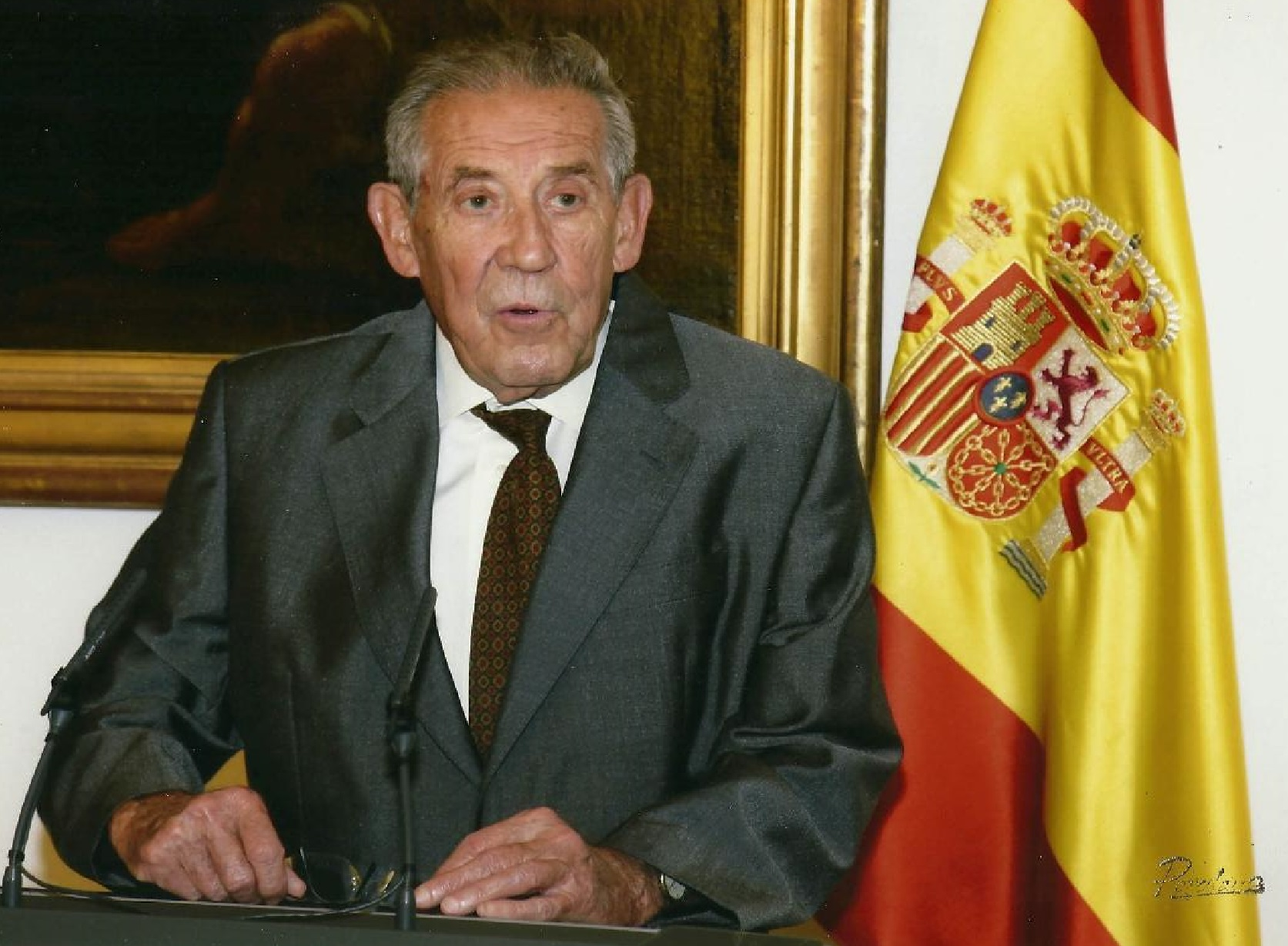

President of the Spanish Council of State
- In office 2004–2012
- Preceded by: José Manuel Romay Beccaría
- Succeeded by: José Manuel Romay Beccaría

Judge of the Constitutional Court of Spain
- In office 1980–1992

Personal details
- Born: 25 February 1930 Berlanga, Badajoz, Spain
- Died: 23 January 2016 (aged 85) Madrid, Spain

Francisco Rubio Llorente (25 February 1930 – 23 January 2016) was a Spanish judge and law professor. He was President of the Spanish Council of State between 2004 and 2012, his predecessor and successor was José Manuel Romay Beccaría. He was judge on the Constitutional Court of Spain between 1980 and 1992, of which he spend the last three years as Vice President.

Rubio Llorente was born in Berlanga, Badajoz, where a square has been named after him. He was a law professor at the Central University of Venezuela between 1959 and 1967. He then returned to Spain to take up a similar position at the Complutense University of Madrid, which he kept until his retirement.

From 1977 to 1979 he was secretary general in the Congress of Deputies. In 1979 he became the first director of the Centro de Estudios Políticos y Constitucionales.

Spanish Prime Minister José Luis Rodríguez Zapatero asked him to look into the options of constitutional reform. In March 2005 Rubio Llorente became head of the study commission tasked with this.

He died on 23 January 2016 in Madrid.
