= National Transplant Organization =

Agency of the Spanish Ministry of Health

- Organización Nacional de Trasplantes
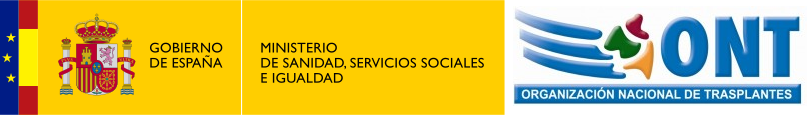

Autonomous agency overview
- Formed: 1989
- Jurisdiction: Government of Spain
- Headquarters: Calle Sinesio Delgado, 6-8 — Pabellón 3 Madrid
- Annual budget: €6.7 million, 2023
- Autonomous agency executives: Faustino Blanco, President; Beatriz Domínguez-Gil, Director
- Parent department: Ministry of Health
- Website: www.ont.es

The National Transplant Organization (Spanish: Organización Nacional de Trasplantes, ONT) is an independent coordinating agency of the Spanish Ministry of Health responsible for developing the competencies related with provision and clinical utilization of organs, tissues and cells. The agency is headed by the Secretary-General for Health and Consumer Affairs, Faustino Blanco, although the chief executive of the agency is the Director, currently Dr. Beatriz Domínguez-Gil.

== Organisation ==
The essential mission of the ONT is to promote and facilitate donation and transplantation of organs, tissues, and cells. It also guarantees the appropriate and correct distribution, according to the technical knowledge and equity principles behind organ transplantation.

To carry out these tasks, it functions as a technical operative unit that adheres to the principles of cooperation, efficacy, and solidarity, fulfills its mission of coordinating the activities of donation, extraction, preservation, distribution, exchange, and transplantation of organs, tissues and cells throughout the whole Spanish Health Care System, itself distributed along the autonomous communities of Spain.

After the creation of the ONT in 1989, Spain went from 14 donors per million population (pmp) to 35.1 donors pmp in 2005, 40.2 in 2015, 46,9 in 2017 and 48 donors pmp in 2018. That changed it from ranking an intermediate-low position in donation rates in Europe, to having the highest rate not just in Europe, but also worldwide.
