= Government Delegation for the National Drugs Plan =

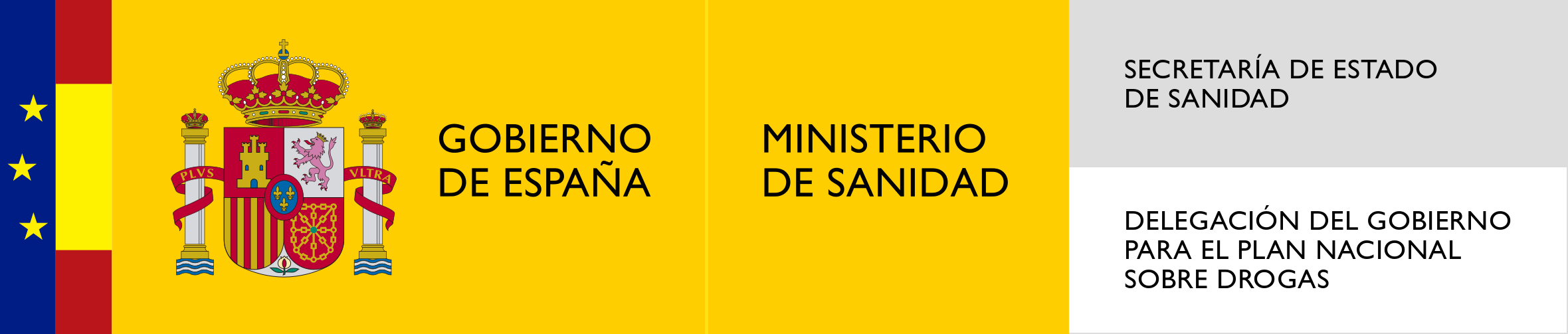
- Logo of the Government Delegation for the National Drugs Plan

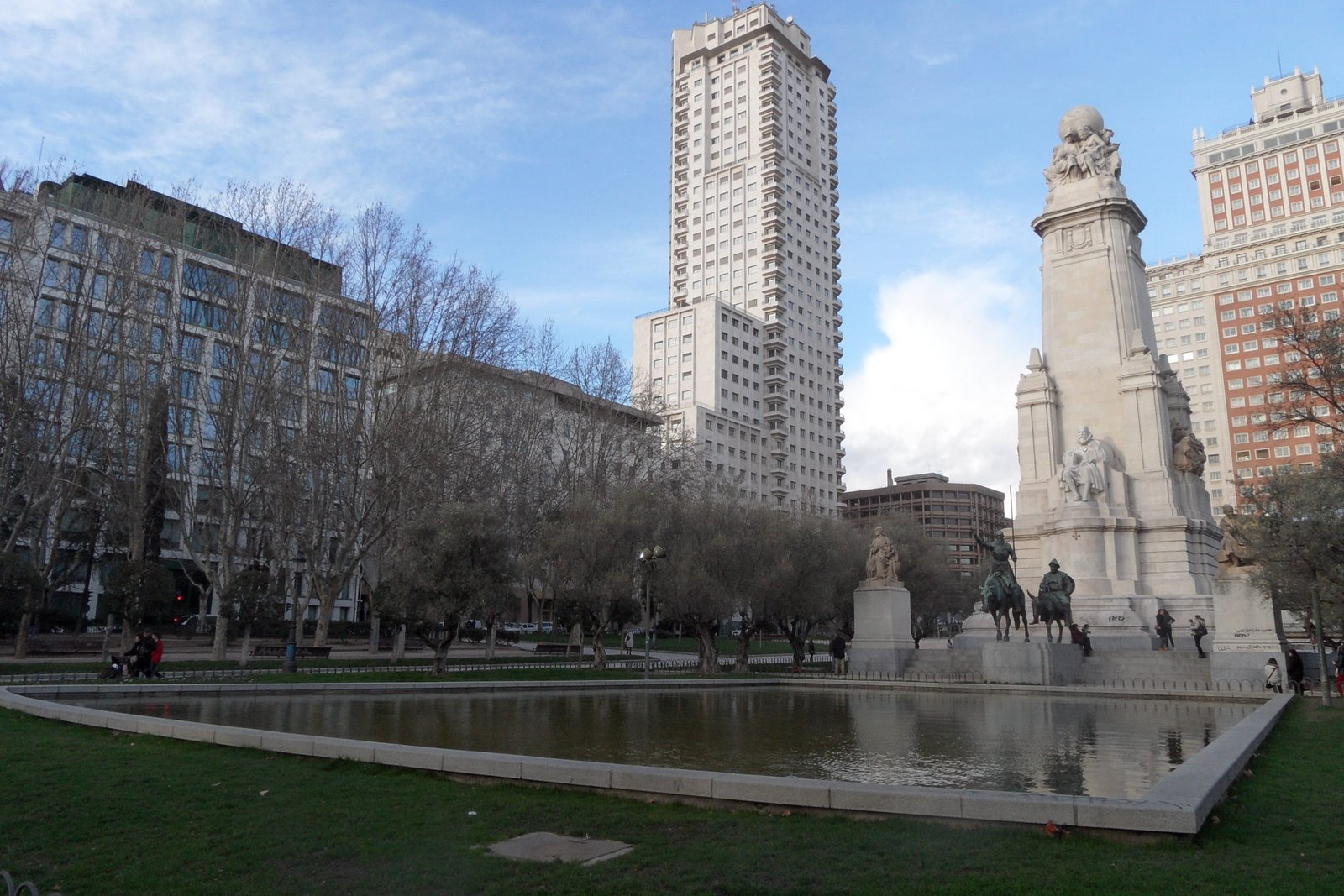
- The headquarters of the DGPNSD is located in the Plaza de España (central building, next to the Torre de Madrid).

Agency overview
- Formed: September 11, 1985; 40 years ago
- Type: directorate-general
- Headquarters: Plaza de España, Madrid
- Annual budget: 15.7 million € (2023)
- Agency executive: Juan Ramón Villalbí Hereter
- Parent department: Ministry of Health
- Website: https://pnsd.sanidad.gob.es/

The Government Delegation for the National Drugs Plan (Spanish: Delegación del Gobierno para el Plan Nacional sobre Drogas, DGPNSD) is the executive body of the Spanish Ministry of Health, attached to the Secretary of State for Health, which is responsible for the management, promotion, general coordination and supervision of the services in charge of updating and executing the National Drugs Plan.

Within the scope of the competencies of the Ministry of Health, under the superior direction of the Secretary of State for Health, it is responsible for promoting policies to reduce the demand for drug use and programs for prevention, treatment, social incorporation and harm reduction related to addictive behaviors.

== History ==
The Government Delegation for the National Drugs Plan was created by Royal Decree on September 11, 1985, within the Ministry of Health and Consumer Affairs. It was originally constituted as a unipersonal body with the rank of Under-Secretary, supported by a technical cabinet and with the objective of coordinating the actions related to the Plan. A year later, a deputy directorate-general was created and in 1990 the figure of the Deputy Delegate was created, which was abolished in 1992.

Since 1991, the structure has been institutionalized, with a Deputy to whom two general deputy directorates-general report, one for institutional relations and the other for cooperation and advisory services. The original deputy directorate-general of the delegation and the technical office were also abolished. In 1992, the figure of the Deputy (with the rank of director-general) was eliminated and the Directorate-General for the National Drugs Plan was created, with up to three deputy directorates-general reporting to it.

In 1993, the delegation was transferred to the Ministry of Social Affairs, which elevated it to the rank of Secretary of State. Likewise, an office with the rank of Directorate General was created and the already existing Directorate General was maintained. However, a few weeks later it was transferred to the Ministry of the Interior with the aim of "providing this body with the necessary coordination instruments to develop an integrated action on drugs that includes both the prosecution of drug trafficking and prevention and rehabilitation". With this new assignment, two new offices were created, one for evaluation and follow-up and the other for analysis and coordination, as well as the Superior Council for the Fight against Drug Trafficking and Money Laundering and the Group for Advice and Assistance in Operations against Drug Trafficking and Money Laundering. In 1996, still in the Interior, its rank was downgraded to Subsecretary and the General Directorate was abolished, creating two deputy directorates-general. In 2000 the Deputy Directorate-General for the National Drugs Plan (active between 1985 and 1991) was also recovered.

In 2004, it was reintegrated into the Ministry of Health and Consumer Affairs and its category was established as a directorate-general, its three deputy directorates-general were renamed and the cabinets were eliminated, establishing a structure that is maintained in the current Ministry of Health.

== Functions ==
The functions of the Government Delegation are regulated in Article 6 of Royal Decree 735/2020, and are:

- To provide technical support to the secretariat of the Sectorial Conference of the National Drugs Plan, preparing and coordinating all matters to be submitted to this collegiate body, to ensure the execution of all its agreements, as well as to exercise coordination in this field between bodies and units of the different ministerial departments.
- To promote and coordinate relations with the different Administrations and institutions, both public and private, including non-governmental organizations, that develop activities in the field of the National Drugs Plan, providing them with the necessary technical support.
- To draw up and propose the National Strategies on Addictions and the Action Plans that develop them, coordinating with the Public Administrations and social agents the execution of the actions and measures aimed at achieving the objectives indicated therein.
- To carry out and coordinate in the Spanish territory activities for the collection and analysis of data and the dissemination of information, both of a statistical and epidemiological nature, on the consumption of drugs and drug addictions, as well as on other addictions, defining, for such purposes, indicators and criteria, acting as the Spanish Observatory on Drugs and Addictions, without prejudice to the competences that the Autonomous Communities may exercise on the matter in their respective territorial spheres, in accordance with their Statutes of Autonomy.
- To elaborate and direct the State Survey on Drug Use in Secondary Education and the Household Survey on Alcohol and Drugs in Spain and other surveys on drugs and addictions, as well as to collect and elaborate the information of the indicators that make up the State Information System on Drugs and Addictions.
- To direct the Documentation Center of the National Drugs Plan, which serves as a documentary and informative reference in the field of addictions and drug addictions.
- To coordinate the Spanish Early Warning System on New Psychoactive Substances, its action protocols and the elaboration of information and alerts for its dissemination and to act as interlocutor and responsible for the exchange of information with the Early Warning System on New Psychoactive Substances of the European Union.

== Structure ==
The following bodies report to the Government Delegation, through which it exercises the rest of its functions:

- The Deputy Directorate-General for Program Coordination, which carries out the functions related to promoting, analyzing, proposing and managing, within the scope of its competencies, programs for prevention and social incorporation in the field of addictions, in coordination with the different institutions that participate in the National Drugs Plan; encouraging the participation of companies and social entities in the activities of the National Drugs Plan, promoting the incorporation of programs on addictions into the development of corporate social responsibility; To promote and encourage training aimed at health professionals and other professionals in the different aspects related to addictions, without prejudice to the competencies of the autonomous communities; to encourage research activity in the field of drugs and other addictions at the state level and to propose priority lines of research considered to be of interest for the objectives of the National Drugs Plan; and to promote systems for the evaluation of prevention, treatment and social incorporation programs and to apply these systems to the programs and activities financed with charge to the National Drugs Plan.
- The Deputy Directorate-General for Institutional Relations, which is in charge, in collaboration with the Technical General Secretariat, of coordinating the national position, participating in the meetings of the corresponding international organizations, and intervening in the application of the agreements derived from them and, especially, of those developed in the framework of cooperation within the European Union, in the field of drugs, exercising the general coordination between the Units of the different ministerial Departments that carry out actions in such fields, without prejudice to the attributions that these have recognized and the unity of representation and action of the State abroad, attributed to the MAEUEC; and to serve as a state organ of communication with the European Monitoring Centre for Drugs and Drug Addiction in the exercise of the competences that this has been recognized in the community regulations, which is concretely translated into being the Spanish Focal Point at an operative level.
- The Deputy Directorate-General for Management, which is responsible for collaborating in the management and administration of all the human, economic and technical resources of the Government Delegation, with the higher or managerial bodies of the department with competence in these matters; to administer, manage and dispose of, under the direction and supervision of the Adjudication Coordination Board, the assets included in the Fund of assets confiscated for illicit drug trafficking and other related crimes, regulated by Law 17/2003, of May 29, 2003, and to provide technical and material support to said Board; and to collaborate with the Directorate-General for Legal Security and Certification, under the Ministry of Justice, in its functions as the Office for Assets Recovery and Management.

The Delegation also has a Support Unit and the Spanish Observatory on Drugs and Addictions (OEDA).

=== Affiliated organizations ===
- The Spanish Council on Drug Addictions and other Addictions.
- The Adjudication Coordination Board.
- The Technical Commission for the Assessment of Actions on Drugs.

== National Drugs Plan ==
The National Drugs Plan (PNSD) is an initiative of the Spanish Government born in 1985 with the aim of coordinating and promoting drug policies carried out by the different Public Administrations and social entities in the country. It does this through a governing body, the Government Delegation for the National Drugs Plan (DGPNSD).

=== National Strategy on Addictions ===
The National Strategy on Addictions is the instrument through which the PNSD is periodically updated. It is, in short, the general political framework that establishes, in the specific period of its application, the priorities and basic objectives in this area that must be taken into account, respected and fulfilled, in accordance with their respective competences and in their respective territorial scopes, by all the Public Administrations.

The Strategy is prepared and coordinated in its execution by the Government Delegation for the National Drugs Plan, with the mandatory collaboration of the ministries represented in the Sectorial Conference of the National Drugs Plan and in the Spanish Council on Drug Addictions and other Addictions, as well as of those other administrative bodies of the General State Administration and of the agencies and entities dependent on it, whose collaboration, as the case may be, is considered necessary.

The current strategy was approved by the Council of Ministers in February 2018 and has a duration of seven years (2017–2024). It has three general objectives:

- To decrease the harms associated with the consumption of substances with addictive potential and those caused by behavioral addictions.
- Decrease the presence and consumption of substances with addictive potential and behavioral addictions.
- Delay the age of onset of addictions.

For its development, there are Action Plans.

=== Agencies ===
==== Spanish Council on Drug Dependency and other Addictions ====
The Spanish Council on Drug Addictions and other Addictions is the collegiate consultation and advisory body whose objective is to improve the technical quality in the definition and execution of state policies and actions to control the supply and reduction of the demand for drugs, as well as other addictions, and their harmful effects on the lives of people and society, which are promoted, coordinated or carried out by the Government Delegation.

It was created in 2014 and replaced the Interministerial Group for the National Drugs Plan and the Advisory Council of the Spanish Observatory on Drugs and Drug Addiction.

As of 2023, the council is Chaired by the head of the Secretary of State for Health and the vice-presidency is exercised by the head of the Government Delegation. The members of the council also include representatives of the Government Delegation, the Directorate-General for Public Health, the Ministry of the Interior, the Ministry of Justice, the Ministry of Labour, the Ministry of Education, the Ministry of Territorial Policy, the Ministry of Foreign Affairs, the Ministry of Social Affairs, the Autonomous Communities, local entities, the State Attorney General's Office and the main social agents and the scientific community.

==== Sectorial Conference on Drugs ====
This is the political decision-making body. It is made up of the Minister of Health, representatives of the General State Administration and the regional government councilors responsible for this area.

==== Interautonomous Drug Commission ====
It is a body chaired by the Government Delegate and made up of the main heads of the regional plans on drugs that exist in the Spanish autonomous communities and cities. It is formed as the main working group of the Sectorial Conference.

== Delegates List ==
1. Miguel Solans Soteras (1985–1992)
2. Jesús García-ViIloslada Quintanilla (1992–1993)
3. Baltasar Garzón Real (1993–1994)
4. Carlos López Riaño (1994–1996)
5. Gonzalo Robles Orozco (1996–2003)
6. César Pascual Fernández (2003–2004)
7. Carmen Moya García (2004–2010)
8. Nuria Espí de Navas (2010–2012)
9. Francisco de Asís Babín Vich (2012–2018)
10. María Azucena Martí Palacios (2018–2020)
11. Juan Ramón Villalbí Hereter (2020-)
