= Spanish Agency for Food Safety and Nutrition =

Government agency

- Agencia Española de Seguridad Alimentaria y Nutrición
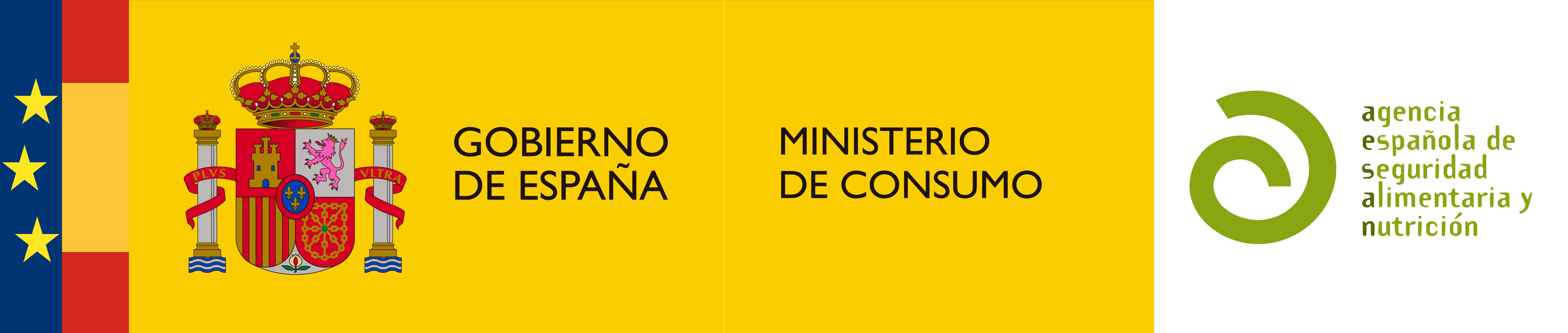
- Logo

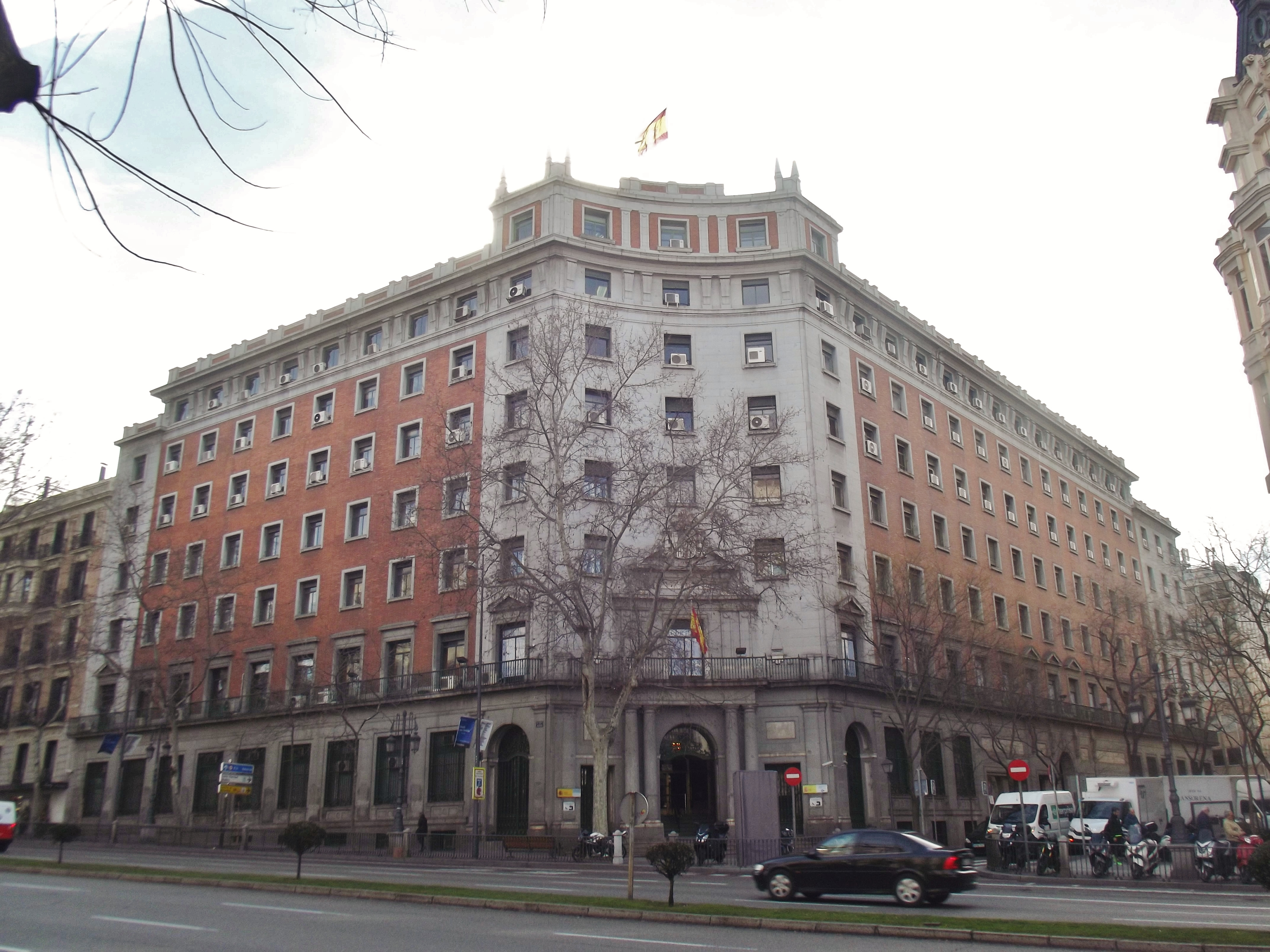
- Headquarters in Madrid

Agency overview
- Formed: July 7, 2001; 25 years ago
- Jurisdiction: Spain
- Headquarters: Calle Alcalá 56, Madrid, Spain
- Employees: 196 (2019)
- Annual budget: € 22.1 million, 2023
- Agency executives: Andrés Barragán Urbiola, President; Ana María López-Santacruz, Executive Director
- Parent agency: Ministry of Social Rights, Consumer Affairs and 2030 Agenda
- Website: www.aecosan.gob.es

The Spanish Agency for Food Safety and Nutrition (AESAN) is a regulatory agency of the Government of Spain responsible for promoting food safety and for providing guarantees and objective information to consumers and economic agents of the Spanish agrifood industry.

It is also responsible for planning, coordinating and developing strategies and actions that promote information, education and promotion of the health in the field of nutrition and especially the prevention of obesity. All this from the scope of action of the powers of the General State Administration and with the cooperation of other Public Administrations and interested sectors.

== History ==
The AESAN was created in 2001 as Spanish Agency for Food Safety. In 2006 it was renamed as Spanish Agency for Food Safety and Nutrition.

In 2014, the agency was transformed into the Spanish Agency for Consumer Affairs, Food Safety and Nutrition (AECOSAN) as a result of the merging of the National Institute for Consumer Affairs and the Spanish Agency for Food Safety and Nutrition. The National Institute for Consumer Affairs was created in 1975 and the Spanish Agency for Food Safety and Nutrition in 2001 (although without the nutrition responsibilities, which were incorporated in 2006).

Because both agencies shared a mission in terms of protecting the health and safety of consumers and users, and although each of them had specific areas of action, the truth is that both worked in the field of food. The new Agency was born, in short, with an integrating and cooperative vocation of all the agents involved in guaranteeing consumer safety in its broadest sense. This was also done to put Spanish agencies in tune with European Union agencies.

In August 2018, the agency lost its responsibilities on consumer rights because of the creation of the Directorate-General for Consumer Affairs within the Department of Health, Consumer Affairs and Social Welfare. Because of this, it recovered its previous name. In 2020, the agency was transferred to the newly created Department of Consumer Affairs. After the dissolution of this department in late 2023, it was attached to the Ministry of Social Rights, Consumer Affairs and 2030 Agenda.

== Organization chart ==
The agency is divided in four type of bodies: Governing bodies, Executive and managing bodies, Advisory and coordination bodies and Risk assessment bodies:

- Governing bodies.
  - The president. It's the Secretary-General for Consumer Affairs and Gambling, with the rank of Under-Secretary.
  - The Governing Board.
- Executive and managing bodies.
  - The executive director, freely appointed by the minister among the senior civil servants with experience on food safety or nutrition.
  - The deputy directors-general.
- Advisory and coordination bodies.
  - The Institutional Commission.
  - The Valuation Committee.
  - The Advisory Council.
  - The Council of Consumers and Users.
  - The General Council of the Consumer Arbitration System.
- Risk assessment bodies.
  - The Scientific Committee.

== See also ==
- Obesity in Spain
- European Food Safety Authority
- Consumer protection
