= Casa Sindical =

Building in Madrid, Spain

Coordinates: 40.413411°N 3.693969°W

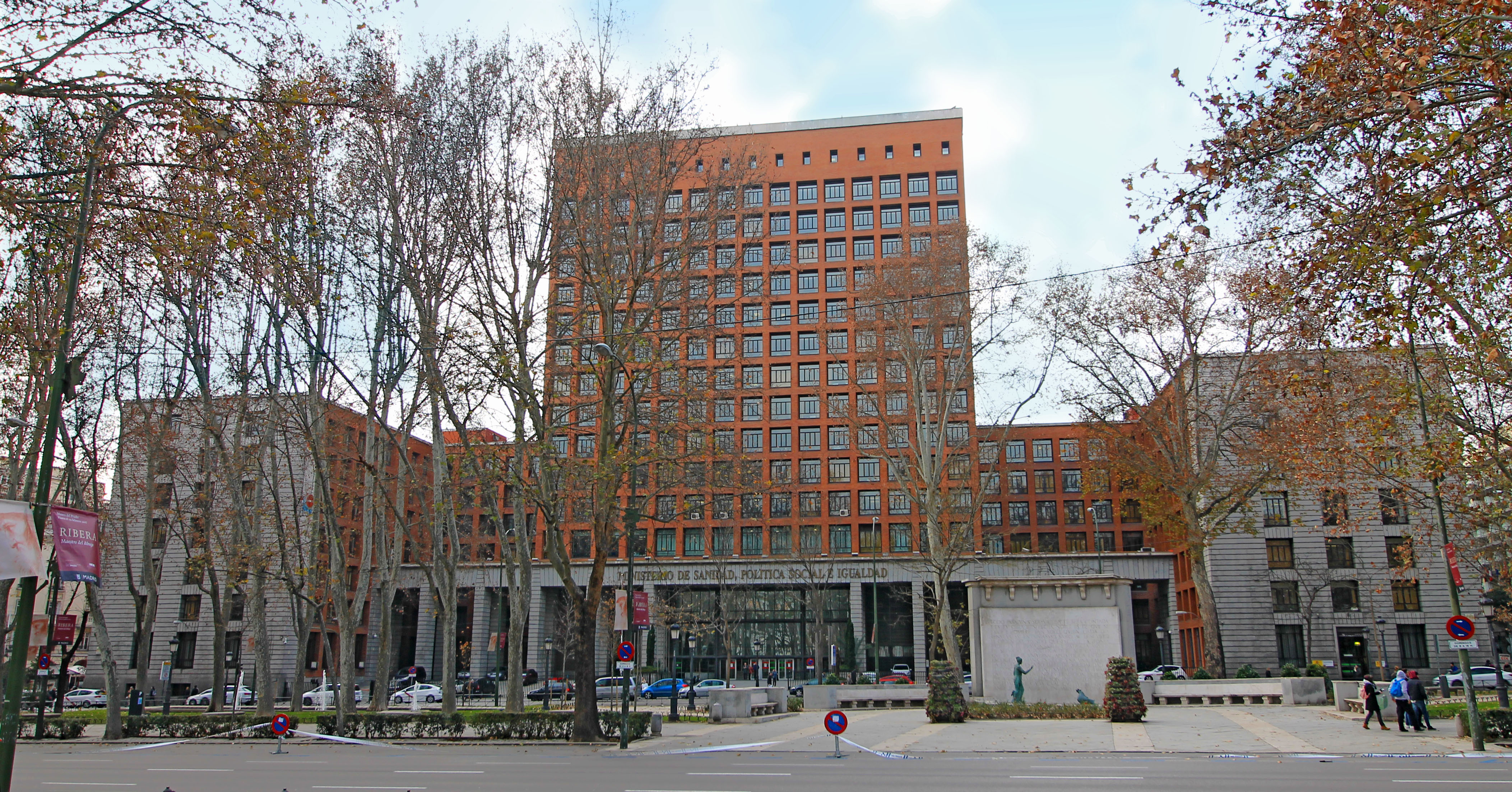
- Interactive map of the Casa Sindical area

General information
- Location: Cortes, Madrid, Paseo del Prado, 20, Spain
- Construction started: 1949
- Completed: 1951
- Inaugurated: 27 October 1955

Height
- Height: 60 m

Technical details
- Floor count: 16

Design and construction
- Architects: Francisco de Asís Cabrero; Rafael de Aburto

The Casa Sindical (the "Syndical House") is a building in Madrid, Spain. It currently hosts the headquarters of the Ministry of Health of Spain.

== History ==
The contest guidelines for the draft project, convened by Fermín Sanz Orrio, the then national delegate of trade unions of FET y de las JONS, were published in April 1949. The project was finally entrusted ex-aequo to Francisco de Asís Cabrero and Rafael de Aburto. Finished in 1951, some dependencies were opened in July 1955, taking advantage of the celebration of the III National Congress of Workers. (Note: José Antonio Girón de Velasco, the Falangist minister of Labour, declared then 'this modern and arrogant tower, claims to the 4 poles of the horizon that the "Movement" is in movement'.) It was formally inaugurated by Francisco Franco on 27 October 1955.

== Description ==
Located in front of the Prado Museum, it features a central prismatic 16-floor brick tower, that reaches a 60-metre height. The landmark symbolically marked the acceptance of modern architecture by the Francoist regime in terms of architectural language, straying away from previous traditionalist aesthetics. It has often been linked to the works of Italian Fascist architect Giuseppe Terragni.

== Bibliography ==
- Amaya Quer, Àlex (2010). El acelerón sindicalista: discurso social, imagen y realidad del aparato de propaganda de la organización sindical española, 1957-1969. Carme Molinero Ruiz (Dir.). Bellaterra: Universitat Autònoma de Barcelona.
- Canosa Zamora, Elia; García Carballo, Ángela (2016). "Madrid Km 0. La intervención franquista en la construcción de algunos paisajes simbólicos de la capital". Estudios Geográficos. LXXVII (281). Madrid: Consejo Superior de Investigaciones Científicas: 415–442. doi:10.3989/estgeogr.201613. ISSN 0014-1496.
- González Capitel, Antón (1999). "Las décadas oscuras: arquitectura de Madrid 1941-1960" (PDF). Arquitectura de Madrid, siglo XX. Madrid: Tanais. pp. 72–101. ISBN 84-496-0078-2.
- López Díaz, Jesús (2014). "El papel del fascismo y el falangismo en la recepción de la modernidad en la arquitectura española contemporánea". Anales de Historia del Arte. 24. Madrid: Universidad Complutense de Madrid: 237–252. doi:10.5209/rev_ANHA.2014.v24.48703.
- Muñoz-Rojas, Olivia (2009). "Falangist visions of a neo-imperial Madrid". Journal of War & Culture Studies. 2 (3): 335–352. doi:10.1386/jwcs.2.3.335/1. ISSN 1752-6272. S2CID 145481193.
- Rovira, Josep Maria (2001). "El Edificio de la Delegación Nacional de Sindicatos" (PDF). DC. Revista de crítica arquitectònica (5–6). Escola Tècnica Superior d’Arquitectura de Barcelona. ISSN 1887-2360.

== Links ==
- Media related to Casa Sindical, Madrid at Wikimedia Commons
- Ministerio de Sanidad y Consumo at Fundación Arquitectura COAM webpage
