= Ministry of Consumer Affairs (Spain) =

Government ministry of Spain

- Ministerio de Consumo

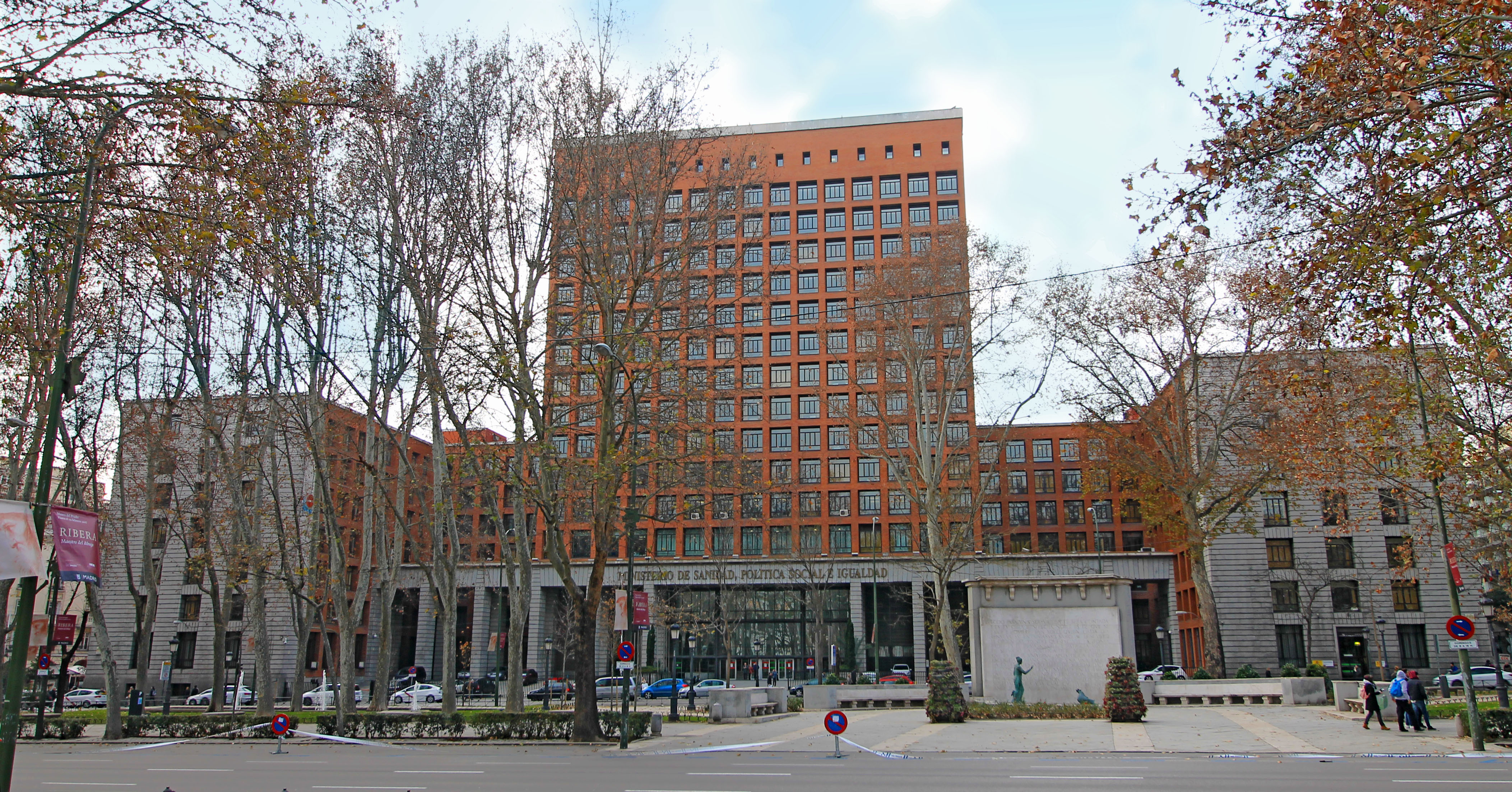
- Headquarters of the Ministry

Agency overview
- Formed: 12 January 2020
- Preceding agencies: Ministry of Health, Consumer Affairs and Social Welfare (consumer affairs); Ministry of Finance (gambling)
- Dissolved: 20 November 2023
- Superseding agency: Ministry of Social Rights, Consumer Affairs and 2030 Agenda
- Type: Ministry
- Jurisdiction: Government of Spain
- Annual budget: € 71 million, 2023
- Minister responsible: Alberto Garzón, Minister
- Website: https://www.consumo.gob.es

The Ministry of Consumer Affairs was a department of the Government of Spain responsible for policies regarding the protection and defense of consumer rights, as well as the regulation, authorization, supervision, control and, where appropriate, sanction of state-level gambling and gaming activities.

The department was created by Prime Minister Pedro Sánchez as part of the Sánchez II Government and it is the first time that a ministry is created to be focused on consumer affairs. It took on the responsibilities of the Ministry of Health, Consumer Affairs and Social Welfare regarding consumer affairs; as well as the responsibilities of the Ministry of Finance in gambling matters. It was abolished on 20 November 2023 and its powers were integrated in the Ministry of Social Rights, Consumer Affairs and 2030 Agenda.

It was overseen by the minister for Consumer Affairs; Alberto Garzón, was the only officeholder.

== Structure ==
The Ministry was structured as follows:

- The General Secretariat for Consumer Affairs and Gambling.
  - The Directorate-General for Consumer Affairs.
    - The Deputy Directorate-General for Coordination, Quality and Consumer Cooperation.
    - The Deputy Directorate-General for Arbitration and Consumer Rights.
  - The Directorate-General for the Regulation of Gambling.
    - The Deputy Directorate-General for the Regulation of Gambling.
    - The Deputy Directorate-General for Gambling Inspection.
- The Undersecretariat of Consumer Affairs.
  - The Technical General Secretariat.

=== Agencies and other bodies ===
- The Spanish Agency for Food Safety and Nutrition.
- The Research and Quality Control Center.
- The Advisory Council for Responsible Gaming
- The National Commission to fight the manipulation of sports competitions and betting fraud.

== List of officeholders ==
Office name:

- Ministry of Consumer Affairs (2020–2023)

Portrait	Name (Birth–Death)	Term of office			Party	Government	Prime Minister (Tenure)	Ref.
Portrait	Name (Birth–Death)	Took office	Left office	Duration	Party	Government	Prime Minister (Tenure)	Ref.
	Alberto Garzón (born 1985)	13 January 2020	21 November 2023	3 years and 312 days	IU, PCE	Sánchez II	Pedro Sánchez (2018–present)	
