= Health care in Spain =

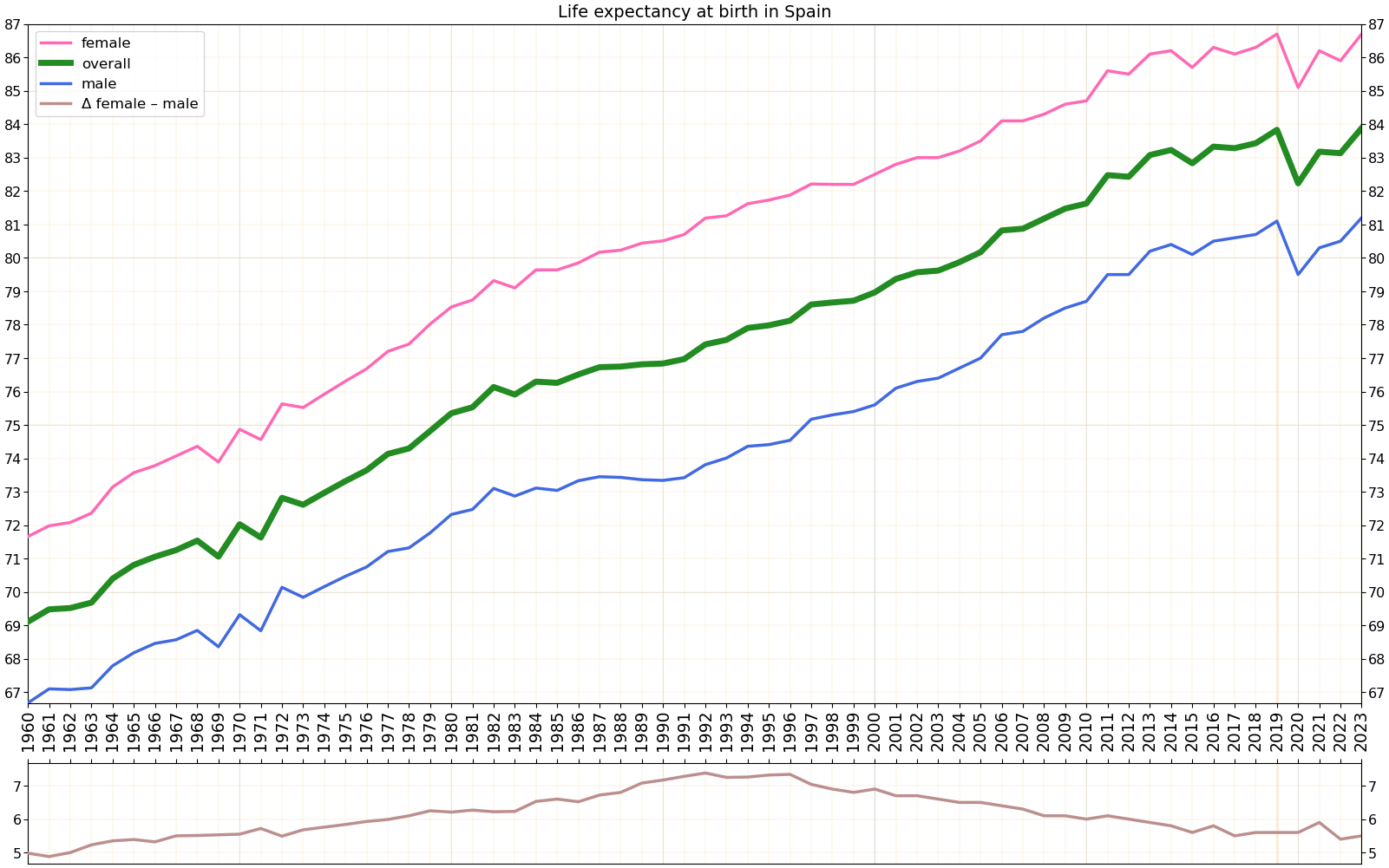
Life expectancy development in Spain by gender

Spain operates a universal health care system. According to the Organisation for Economic Co-operation and Development, total health spending accounted for 6.7% of GDP in Spain in 2011.5, below the OECD average of 9.3%. Spain's healthcare system ranks 19th in Europe according to the 2018 Euro Health Consumer Index. As of 2016, Spain is ranked 1st in the world in organ transplants.

In 2001 the Spanish health care system was ranked as the 7th most efficient healthcare in the world, as indicated in a report by the World Health Organization. In 2011, the public sector was the main source of health funding with 73% of health spending funded by public sources, very close to the average of 72% in OECD countries.

== Hospitals ==
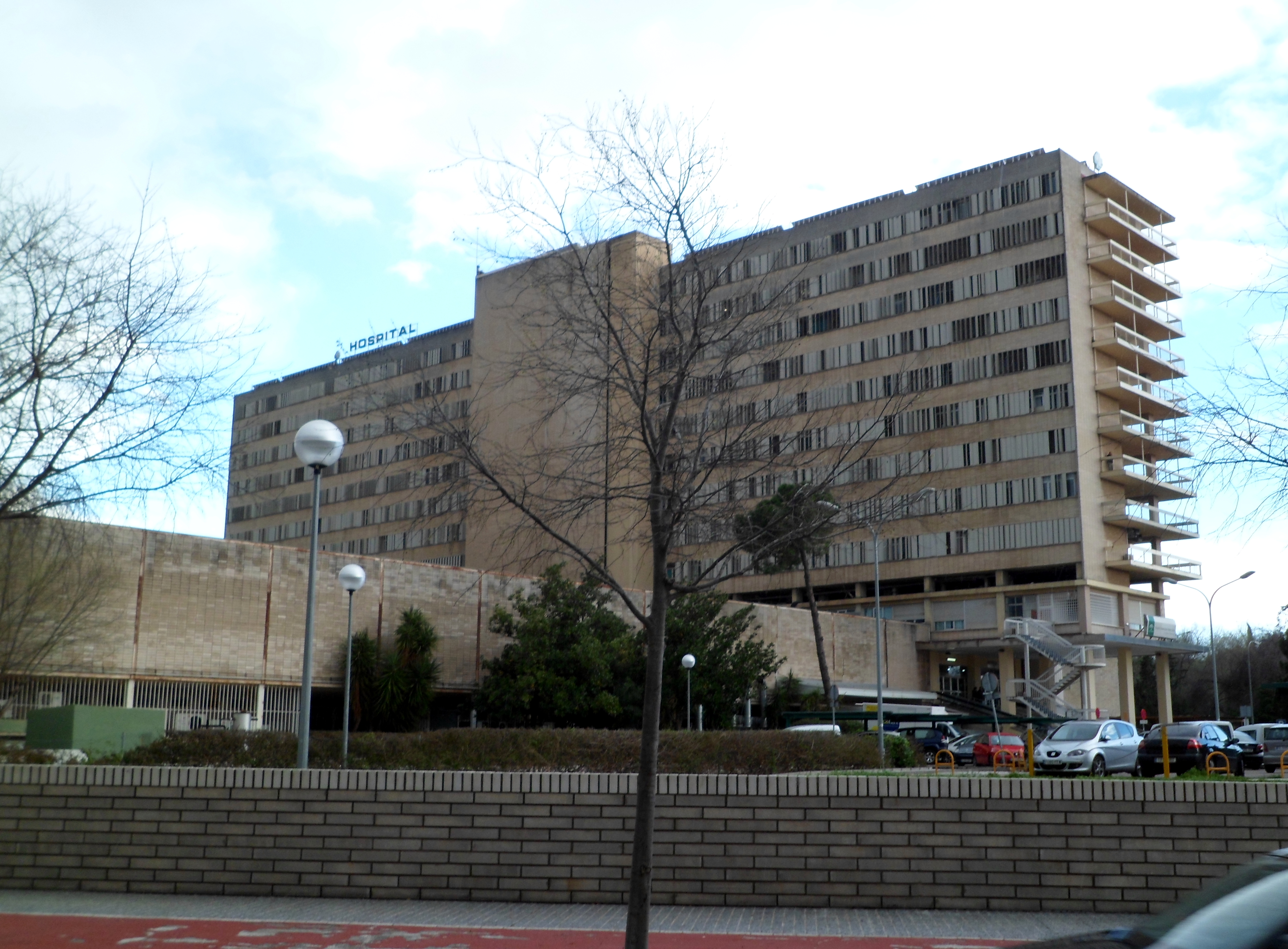
Building of the Provincial Hospital, belonging to the hospital complex of the Reina Sofía University Hospital in Córdoba.

In an emergency, people can go straight to a hospital A&E. For any other type of hospital treatment a referral from a doctor is required. There are public and private hospitals, with the former providing free treatment. As some hospitals offer both private and state healthcare services, the presentation of a social security card, an EHIC, or proof of private insurance is advisable. As hospital doctors do not issue prescriptions, after discharge, patients take the hospital medical report to a pharmacy for prescriptions to be filled.

In Spain patients have the right to read their own patient records, but as of 2015 there was evidence that this is not well publicized.

== Decentralization ==
In Spain, provision of health care services is decentralized, and thus the responsibility of several autonomous communities. In 1998, an analysis of the effects of greater autonomy on legislative performance and policy outcomes for health care observed a positive effect on the former, but no effect on the latter. The analysis noted that a possible explanation for this disconnect was that autonomous communities had only experienced greater autonomy in the area of health care for a short time, and positive effects on policy outcomes could take longer to manifest. In 2009, an analysis of data collected by the Spanish National Health Survey in 2001 showed that autonomous communities with decentralized health services tended to have better equity performance. In 2014, an analysis of data collected by the Spanish Centre of Sociological Research between 1996 and 2009 found that for twenty variables of public satisfaction with health care services, decentralization not only had no effect on 2 measures of primary or specialized care and 1 of hospital care, but actually performed worse on 3 measures of primary or specialized care and 1 measure of hospital care. No statistically significant trend was observed for twelve of the twenty measures of satisfaction. The authors of the analysis stressed that the data was limited due to the subjective nature of patient reports, and the possible inability of some to properly evaluate performance of health care services.

== International comparisons ==
As of 2020, according to the World Economic Forum and to Bloomberg, Spain has the most efficient health system in Europe, and also ranks at the top worldwide along with Hong Kong, Japan and Singapore.

In a sample of 13 developed countries Spain was second in its population weighted usage of medication in 14 classes in both 2009 and 2013. The drugs studied were selected on the basis that, in the previous 10 years the conditions treated had: a high incidence, prevalence and/or mortality; caused significant long-term morbidity; incurred high levels of expenditure or had significant developments in prevention or treatment. The study noted considerable difficulties in cross border comparison of medication use. Ceuta had the highest proportion of practicing doctors per capita of any region in Europe - 871 per 100,000 in 2015.

In 2015, the Euro health consumer index rated Spain 19th of 35 European countries, remarking that there was somewhat of an over-reliance on seeking private care.

== Public opinion ==
According to Van der Schee et al., public opinion about a country's healthcare system is formed by the levels and quality of: trust between a person and their physician, media presentation of the healthcare system as a whole, and the services and care the system provides. When looking at public opinion on Spain's universal healthcare system, generally people seem to agree that the state should be heavily involved in healthcare. Compared to 14 other nations in 2002, Spain ranked third highest for the amount of support the public had for a strong role of the government in healthcare. In terms of public opinion concerning how well the healthcare system actually works, there is a general consensus that the public believes healthcare institutions themselves are doing their jobs well and providing sufficient care. The most overwhelming problem reported by people who took a 2005 survey was that wait times to receive care are too long, though those surveyed reported that this problem could be fixed by the hiring of more physicians.

== Voluntary health insurance ==
Although Spain does have universal health care, it is not the only source of protection available to the Spanish people. In fact, there are three alternatives to relying solely on the provided universal health care: substitutive voluntary health insurance, complementary voluntary health insurance, and supplementary voluntary health insurance. People who work in Spain's public sector are free to opt out of universal health care entirely if they agree to utilize the alternative: a government-subsidized health insurance called MUFACE. This selection of using different health insurance instead of Spain's universal health care is an example of substitutive voluntary health insurance.

Complementary voluntary health insurance comes into play with citizens who use Spain's universal health care but still want additional private insurance to cover services which may not be protected under the universal plan. While Spain's universal health care covers a substantial amount including many basic primary and pharmaceutical services, it fails to cover many important dental and gynecological services among other things. If a Spanish citizen is seeking care outside that which is covered by the state, they have the option to purchase their own private health insurance to ensure that they are covered for any services they may need.

Lastly, supplementary voluntary health insurance is an option for those Spanish citizens who use the available universal health care, but would also like additional private insurance which may provide them better or more suitable options & benefits. In this case, having supplementary voluntary health insurance is often a luxury that helps people secure faster, more convenient, or better available treatment.

According to the OECD, in 2002 about 5% of the Spanish population was covered by one of the above types of voluntary health insurance.

== Equality ==
In Spain, co-payments do not usually apply and are limited to special medicines and services that are not covered by the National Health System. Therefore, an individual's financial status does not typically determine access to general healthcare.

Some inequality does arise in those areas that the NHS does not cover, such as dental care. On the other hand, people in a disadvantaged social class will typically rely more on the public system for primary health care than those of higher social status. Around 10% of the Spanish population uses private health insurance, generally implying higher socio-economic status, which facilitates access to primary health care. While health care services are universal and continue to see an increase in use within Spain, there are still issues among those with disadvantaged backgrounds.

== Immigrants ==
Immigration was seen as one of the most problematic issues for Spain in 2006 by their population. Migrants are entitled to full public health care benefits, regardless of their legal status. This is due to the goals set by Minister Ernest Lluch in the General Health Law of 1986, which was based on universality of health care. Soon following through many reforms, the Public Health Law of 2011 was enacted, giving all people in Spain the right to free health care regardless of their legal status. While this was overturned through royal decree in 2012, making legality a necessary factor for healthcare, the law was once again reestablished in 2018 after the resignation of Prime Minister Mariano Rajoy, providing all people in Spain universal access to healthcare.

Regarding the use of health care services, there are multiple studies conducted to show the differences between immigrants and nationals. In 2006, studies showed that immigrants had seen a larger number of visits towards emergency rooms when compared to visits from nationals. Conversely, immigrants had shown a lower frequency of visits to general practitioners, fewer days in hospitals, and visits to specialists had seen a lower amount than those reported by Spaniards. In more recent years, a 2016 study shows that global use of healthcare in Spain was utilized more by nationals than by immigrants in all areas. Along with this, the costs for annual prescription drugs showed a much lower price for immigrants when compared to the prices that are given to nationals. The costs for healthcare in Spain are typically higher for those natives than they are for foreign born immigrants, the mean price being nearly 6.8 times higher. These differences, as referenced in the research study, could be explained in part due to migrants being younger and in healthier conditions, or potentially through possible inequalities among Spanish healthcare providers.

In July 2018 the Spanish government approved Real Decreto‑Ley 7/2018 of 27 July (“on the access to the National Health System”), thereby restoring universal access to public healthcare for all residents in Spain, including undocumented migrants. The law replaced the eligibility model that had been established in Real Decreto‑Ley 16/2012 (which tied access to employment or insurance status) and re-established the principle that the right to health care is based on residence, not on contributory or beneficiary status. The reform was justified in terms of social justice and public health, emphasising social cohesion and collective benefit of universal access.

When compared to other European countries, most immigrants typically see more physician, general practitioners, and hospital stays than nationals. In a similar fashion, the health of immigrants in other countries are typically in worse shape when compared to natives, Spain being an exception where native-born are considered to be less healthy when compared to their immigrants. Along with this, more individual immigrants in Spain typically have full coverage for costs than is seen by nationals.

== See also ==
- Spanish National Health System
