= Ministry of Health (Spain) =

Government ministry of Spain

- Ministerio de Sanidad

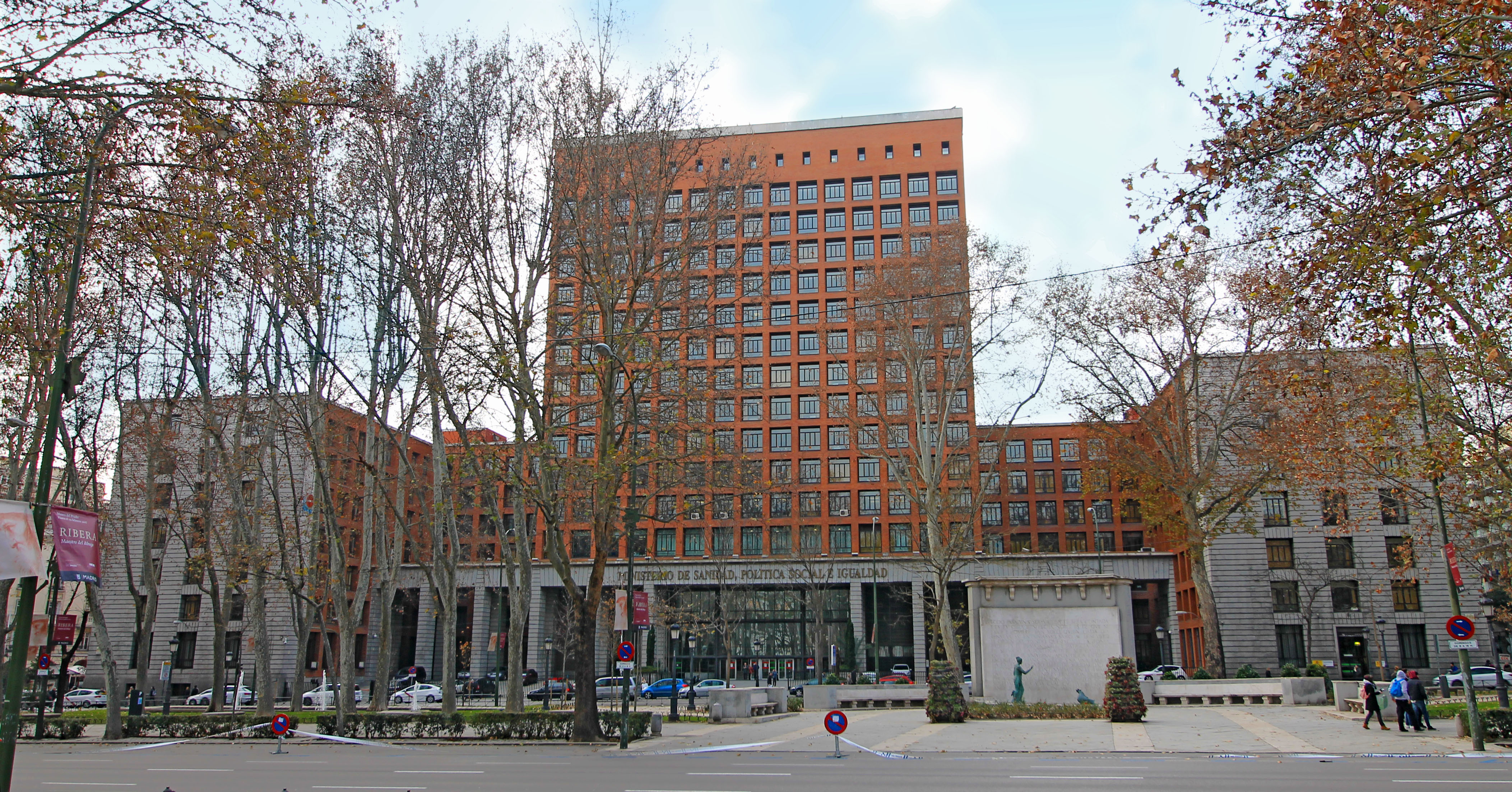
- Headquarters of the Ministry of Health

Agency overview
- Formed: 4 November 1936; 90 years ago
- Preceding agency: Ministry of Labour, Health and Welfare
- Type: Ministry
- Jurisdiction: Government of Spain
- Headquarters: Casa Sindical Building Madrid, Spain
- Annual budget: € 1.02 billion, 2026
- Minister responsible: Mónica García, Minister
- Agency executives: Javier Padilla Bernáldez, Secretary of State; Juan Fernando Muñoz Montalvo, Secretary-General for Digital Health; Ana María Sánchez Hernández, Under-Secretary; Belén González Callado, Commissioner for Mental Health
- Website: Ministry of Health (in Spanish)

The Ministry of Health (MISAN) is the department of the Government of Spain responsible for proposing and implementing the government policy on health, planning and providing healthcare, as well as the exercise of the powers of the General State Administration to assure citizens the right to health protection. The Ministry is headquartered in the Paseo del Prado in Madrid, opposite the Prado Museum.

Healthcare in Spain is provided by the National Health System, a decentralized organization composed by the regional health systems and the National Institute of Health Management, the health agency of the central government that provides health care to the autonomous cities of Ceuta and Melilla. According to Eurostat (2023 data), Spain spends 9.2% of its GDP on health, approximately €138 billion ($161 billion).

According to the Annual Report of the National Health System 2024, the total expenditure of the Spanish health system in 2022 was 134 billion euros (99.3 billion corresponding to the public sector and 34.7 billion to the private sector). This represented 2,805 euros per capita and an expenditure of 10% of the Spanish GDP. As of 2022, regarding human resources, the Spanish public and private health sectors employed around 900,000 professionals. Of these, 212,201 were medical professionals, 284,232 nursing professionals, and 382,731 (Note: This number only includes public employees.) were other types of health professionals.

The Minister of Health is the head of the department and is appointed by the Monarch on the advice of the Prime Minister. The minister is assisted by four main officials: the Secretary of State for Health, the Secretary-General for Digital Health, Information and Innovation of the National Health System, the Department's Under-Secretary and the Commissioner for Mental Health. The current Health Minister is Mónica García since November 2023.

== History ==
=== Early period ===
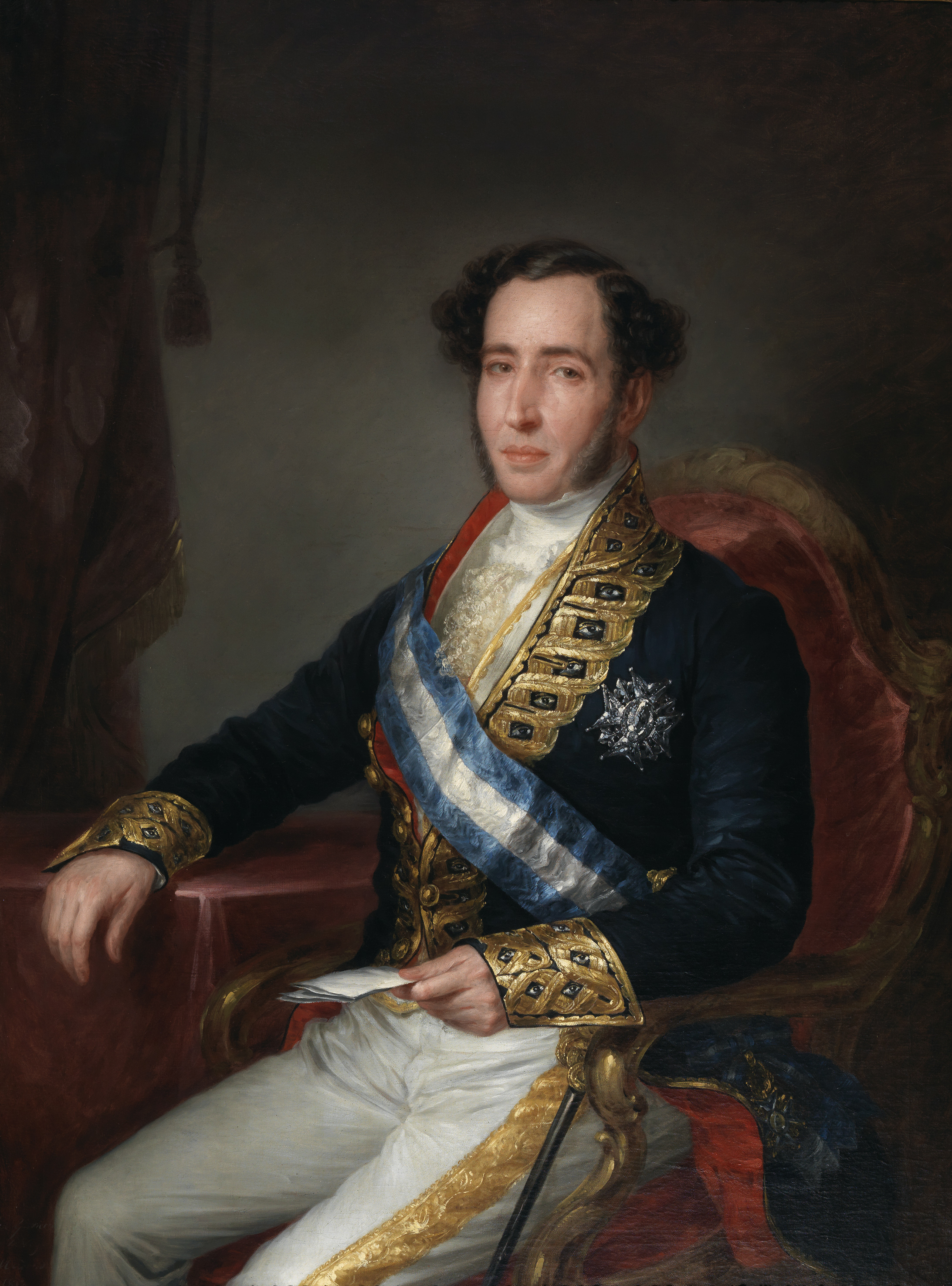
Manuel Seijas Lozano, minister of interior from January to March 1847. He reformed reformed the health services and created some of the modern health administrative structure that still exists today.

Between the 18th and 19th centuries, Spain began to develop its own institutions dedicated to public health. The first of these institutions was the Royal Supreme Health Board (Spanish: Junta Suprema de Sanidad del Reino). This Board, created in 1720 by King Felipe V, aimed to relieve the Council of Castile of its workload and thus create a body that could immediately provide solutions to the problem of the plague, which at that time had arrived by sea from Marseille, France. This body, in addition to debating health measures and advising the monarch, was dedicated to rationalizing and systematizing the scattered health legislation of the time.

In 1847, the minister of the Interior, Manuel de Seijas Lozano, drove a complete reform of the institutional health framework, which involved the abolition of the Royal Supreme Health Board and its replacement by two bodies: the Royal Health Council and the Directorate-General for Health. In this way, while the former had merely advisory functions, the Directorate-General for Health (known nowadays as Directorate-General for Public Health), assumed the executive functions and brought together all the health responsibilities of the Ministry of the Interior, the department responsible for health matters at that time. A few days earlier, a new structure for the Department had been approved, and it was the Directorate-General for Charity, Prisons and Health that assumed these powers. All these reforms were consolidated with the approval of the Health Act of 1855.

=== Inception ===
Health powers remained with this department until 1933, when the Undersecretariat for Health and Charity was transferred to the Ministry of Labour, which then became known as the Ministry of Labour and Health.

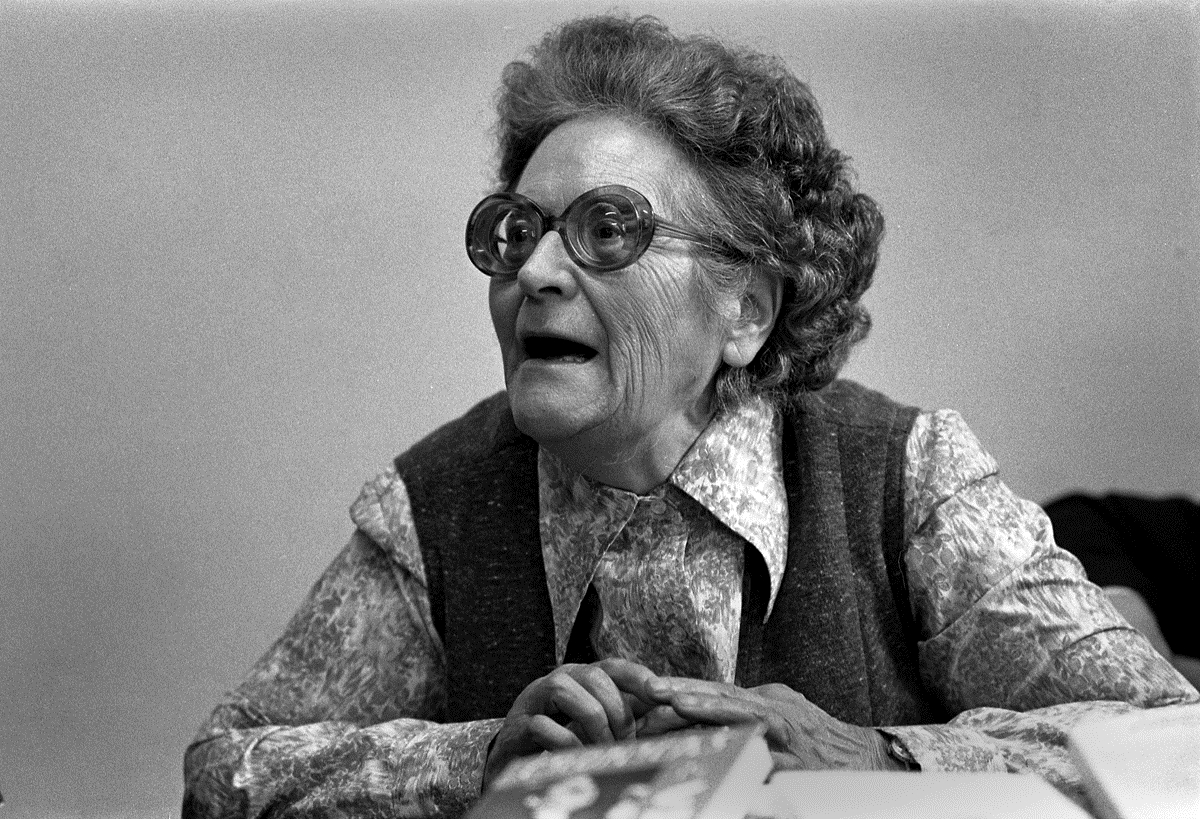
Federica Montseny, first minister and first woman to hold the office.

However, the first ministry focused on health was created on 4 November 1936, during the premiership of Francisco Largo Caballero, as the Ministry of Health and Social Assistance, with a woman holding a cabinet portfolio for the first time in the history of Spain: Federica Montseny.

During that period, Montseny planned childcare centers, soup kitchens for pregnant women, prostitution shelters, and she elaborated a list of professions for disabled people, as well as drafting the first an abortion law in Spain. However, the civil war prevented the minister from developing her projects, in addition to the short life of the ministry.

As stated, the ministry was short-lived. When Juan Negrín replaced Largo Caballero as prime minister, he disbanded the department and its powers were divided between the Ministry of Labour (social affairs) and the Ministry of Education (healthcare) by a Decree of May 1937. After the civil war, the responsibility returned to the Ministry of the Interior until 1977.

=== Return to the Interior Ministry ===
Throughout the dictatorship of Francisco Franco (1939–1975), health care responsibilities remained structured as first established by the 1855 Health Act, with the Directorate-General for Health as the main driving force behind public health policies, and this agency was integrated once again into the Ministry of the Interior. These aspects were ratified by the National Health Basis Act of 1944, which did not change the structure established a century earlier.

=== Democratic period ===
Once the dictator died, Spain began the democratic transition and, during the premiership of Adolfo Suárez, the Department, now called Ministry of Health and Social Security, was recovered by Royal Decree 558/1977, of July 4, which merged the responsibilities in health matters that until then were managed by the Ministry of the Interior, as well as the powers over Social Security that were then held by the Ministry of Labour.

At that time, the department consisted of two undersecretariats (one for the Department's general affairs and other one for Health Management), a Technical General Secretariat, and six Directorates-General: Personnel, Management and Financing; Benefits; Social Services; Healthcare; Pharmaceutical Regulation; and Public and Veterinary Health.

For a short period between February and November 1981, Health was once again merged with Labour. Royal Decree 2823/1981, restored it to full ministerial rank but this time without social security which remained within the Department of Labour. With this reform the Ministry acquired competencies over Consumers Affairs (through the National Institute for Consumers Affairs). During the first years of the premiership of Felipe González, the National Health System and the National Transplant Organization were created thanks primarily to the impulse of the minister Ernest Lluch.

With the victory of the People's Party in the general election of 1996, José Manuel Romay Beccaría was appointed Minister of Health and Consumer Affairs, a position he held throughout the 6th Legislature. Under his direction was created, in 1997, the Spanish Agency of Medicines and Medical Devices. In the 7th Legislature Celia Villalobos became minister (2000–2002) and achieved notoriety by her handling mad cow disease. She was succeeded by Ana Pastor Julián (2002–2004). The mad cow crisis precipitated the creation in 2011 of the Spanish Food Safety Agency, named since 2007 as Spanish Agency for Food Safety and Nutrition.

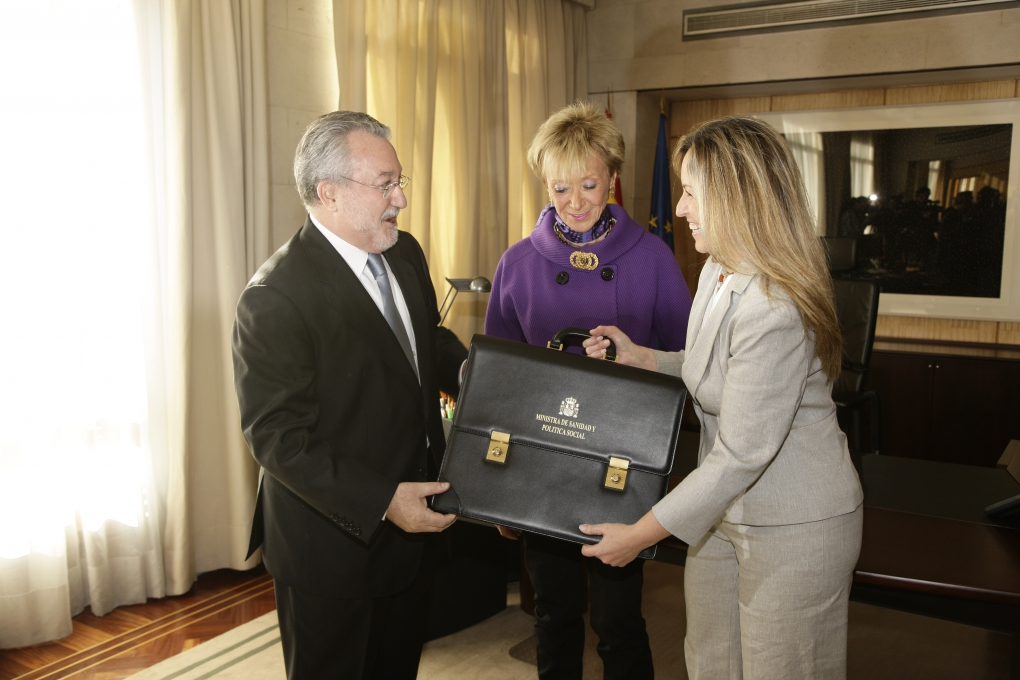
Outgoing minister Bernat Soria hands over the Health portfolio to incoming minister Trinidad Jiménez.

At the beginning of the 8th legislature, Elena Salgado assumed as Health Minister (2004–2007). With her, in 2004 the National Drugs Plan, attached to the Ministry of the Interior, was shifted to the Ministry of Health. Eight months before the end of the legislature, the scientific Bernat Soria assumed the office of Health Minister. In the next legislature Soria was confirmed as Minister of Health and Consumer Affairs, and he was succeeded by Trinidad Jiménez in 2009 following a cabinet reshuffle. Under Jiménez Social Policy was returned to the health portfolio, including the Institute for the Elderly and Social Services (IMSERSO), previously under Education.

Under minister Leire Pajín (October 2010-December 2011), responsibilities on equality issues were added to her duties, previously under a separate ministry of its own, and also assuming the Institute of Women and the Institute of Youth. At the beginning of the 10th legislature Ana Mato became minister and the Ministry assumed (only functionally) the Charles III Health Institute (which still belonged to the Ministry of Economy). In addition, in January 2014 the Spanish Agency for Food Safety and Nutrition and the National Institute for Consumer Affairs merged giving rise to the new Spanish Agency for Consumer Affairs, Food Safety and Nutrition. On 24 November 2014, Mato resigned after being implicated in the corruption case known as Gürtel. On 3 December 2014, Alfonso Alonso succeeded her.

After the 2016 cabinet reshuffle, Dolors Montserrat was appointed Minister of Health and one of his first measures was to raise the rank of the Director of the National Transplant Organization to Director-General in order to strengthen this institution. Barely 1 year later after the assumption of Montserrat, the Güertel case that provoked the resignation of minister Mato also provoked in June 2018 the fall of the Rajoy government through a motion of no-confidence driven by the Leader of the Opposition Pedro Sánchez. After the success of the motion, Sánchez appointed Carmen Montón as Health Minister and the Ministry transferred the competences over equality to the Ministry of the Presidency. Montón also strengthen the consumers affairs competences by recovering the Directorate-General for Consumers Affairs and regained universal healthcare for undocumented immigrants. She resigned after three months in office after a degree scandal and María Luisa Carcedo succeeded her. Carcedo continued with the program established by Montón on fight against pseudosciences and recovering the Observatory of Women's Health.

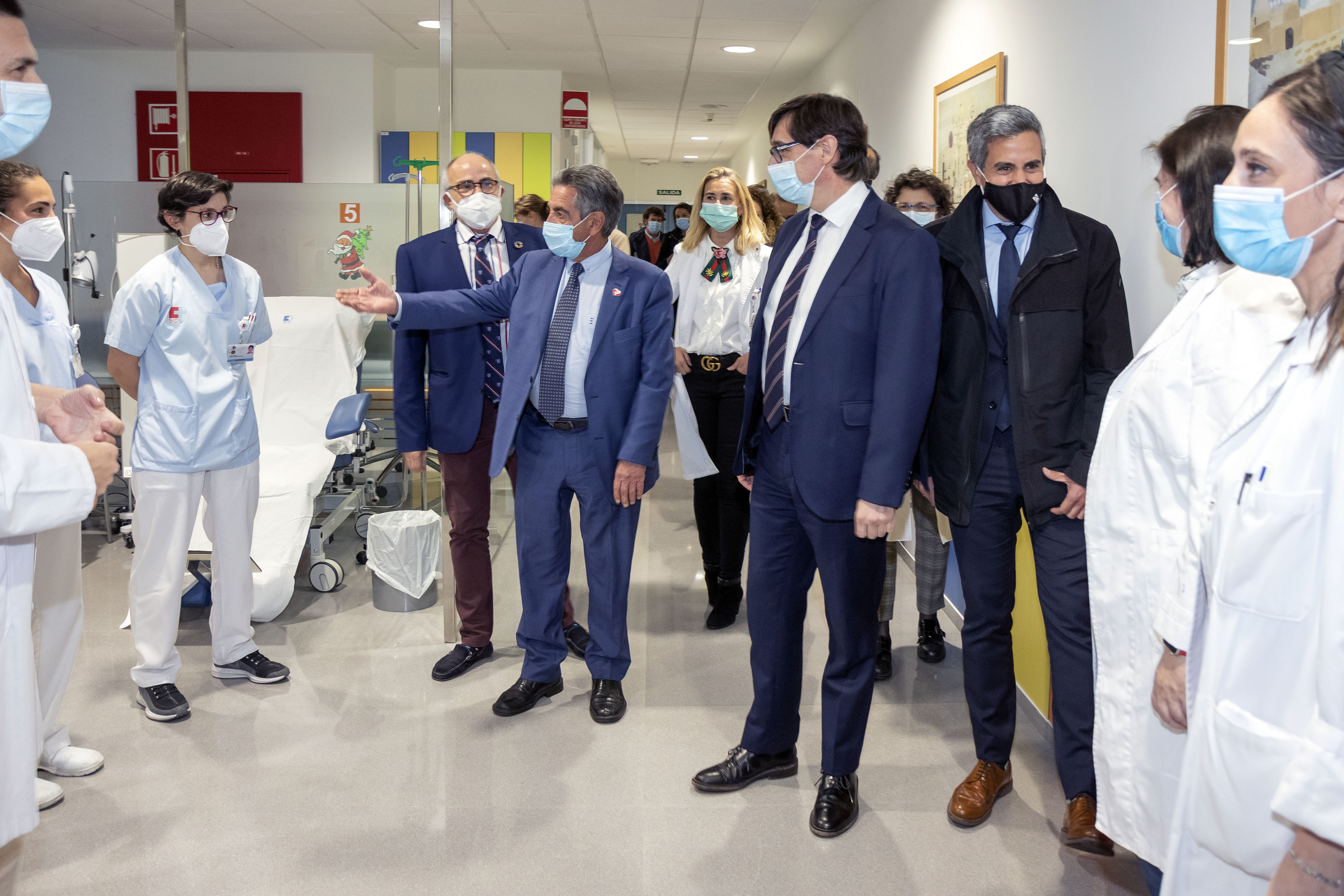
Minister Illa visits the Marqués de Valdecilla University Hospital (Santander, Cantabria) in December 2020.

A major restructuring occurred in 2020. The Department of Health lost all its competences on consumer affairs and social services, that were transferred to the ministries of Consumer Affairs and of Social Rights and 2030 Agenda, respectively. However, in exchange, the department assumed the government policies on drugs. During this time, Carcedo was replaced by Salvador Illa, who had to face the COVID-19 pandemic. It was precisely as a result of this pandemic that in August 2020 the department underwent a major reform in its structure, recovering the position of Secretary of State for Health (which already existed between 1979 and 1981) as second-in-command and creating the General Secretariat for Digital Health, Information and Innovation of the National Health System.

Following Illa's resignation at the beginning of 2021, Carolina Darias took over and promoted the creation of a National Agency of Public Health—whose founding rules were approved in late 2026—, with the aim of improving the prevention and management of future diseases. She also restored the right of single, lesbian, bisexual and transgender women to access assisted reproduction in public health care, which had been suppressed in 2014.

Darias resigned in March 2023 and was replaced by José Miñones. In his brief eight-month term, Miñones officially ended the COVID-19 pandemic and promoted the right to be forgotten for cancer survivors, meaning that anyone who had suffered from cancer would not be required to declare their condition when applying for a loan or taking out insurance.

In November 2023 Mónica García assumed the office, focusing her term in mental health. For this purpose, she created a Commissioner for Mental Health.

== Organization ==
Organizational chart of the Spanish Ministry of Health, July 2024

The minister of health, a member of the Council of Ministers, is the most senior official of the department. The minister establishes the ministry's general policy and appoints the rest of departmental officers.

The minister is assisted by a secretary of state for health, in everything related to healthcare, an under-secretary for the day-to-day management of the department and a commissioner, with the rank of under-secretary, for mental health.

The Ministry of Health is organized as follows (in bold those who depend directly on the minister):

Ministry Organization (2026)
Minister	Cabinet (Chief of Staff)
Secretary of State for Health	General Secretariat for Digital Health, Information and Innovation in the National Health System
Secretary of State for Health	Directorate-General for Digital Health and Information Systems in the National Health System
Secretary of State for Health	Directorate-General for Public Health and Health Equity
Secretary of State for Health	Directorate-General for the Common Benefits Package of the National Health System and Pharmacy
Secretary of State for Health	Directorate-General for Health Professions Regulation
Secretary of State for Health	Government Delegation for the National Drugs Plan
Secretary of State for Health	Spanish Agency of Medicines and Medical Devices
Secretary of State for Health	National Agency of Public Health
Secretary of State for Health	National Transplant Organization
Secretary of State for Health	National Institute of Health Management
Under-Secretary	Technical General Secretariat
Under-Secretary	Deputy Directorate-General for Human Resources
Under-Secretary	Deputy Directorate-General for Economic Management and Budget Office
Under-Secretary	Deputy Directorate-General for Citizen Services and Inspectorate-General of Services
Under-Secretary	Deputy Directorate-General for European Funds Planning and Coordination
Under-Secretary	Division for Information Technologies
Under-Secretary	Division for General and Administrative Affairs
Commissioner for Mental Health	Technical Office for the Transition of the Mental Health Model
Commissioner for Mental Health	Division for Mental Health Prevention, Promotion and Protection

In addition, the Department has two advisory bodies:

- The Advisory Council for Health and Social Services, as an advisory and assistance body in the formulation of health policy.
- The Committee of the professions of the health and social sector.

== Headquarters ==
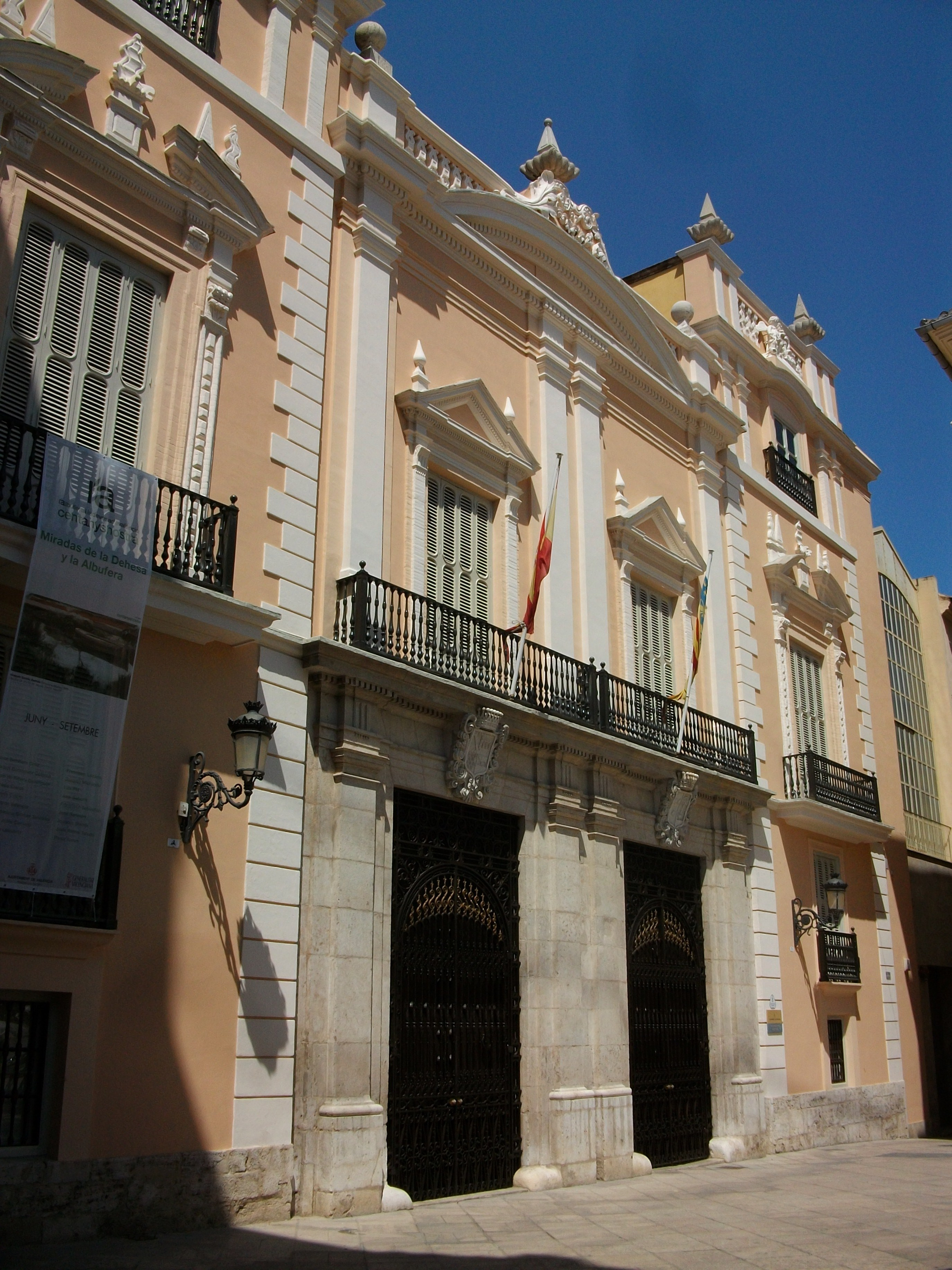
Main door of the Palace of the Marquess of Campo, in Valencia, first headquarters of the Ministry from 1936 to 1937

The department's first headquarters were located in the Palace of the Marques of Campo, in the city of Valencia, during the brief period that the Ministry existed between November 1936 and May 1937.

Currently, since 1977, the Ministry of Health has its main headquarters in a building located on the Paseo del Prado in Madrid. This building is known as the "Casa Sindical" (Spanish: Trade Unions House), as it was built between 1949 and 1951 to house the National Delegation of Trade Unions until its suppression in 1971, after which the office of the Minister for Trade Union Relations was housed here.

Since 2020, due to the division of the powers of the Ministry of Health, it shares headquarters with the Ministry of Social Rights, Consumer Affairs and 2030 Agenda.

=== Others ===
In addition to the main headquarters, some bodies and agencies have their own headquarters, namely:

- The Government Delegation for the National Drugs Plan, based in the central Plaza de España.
- The Spanish Agency of Medicines and Medical Devices, in a building on the outskirts of the capital.
- The National Institute of Health Management, which is housed in the former headquarters of the National Institute of Social Insurance.
- The National Transplant Organization, located in a Madrid government complex in the vicinity of Cuatro Torres Business Area, which also houses facilities of the Carlos III Health Institute.

== Budget ==
In millions of euros (€)
1. Health policy and regulation 725.5 (71.0%)
2. Healthcare and pharmacy services 212.7 (20.8%)
3. Central services 39.5 (3.87%)
4. Digital health policy 28.9 (2.83%)
5. National Drug Plan 15.1 (1.48%)

As mentioned above, the Spanish healthcare system is decentralized and the Spanish regions are responsible for health policy.

For fiscal year 2026, the Ministry of Health has a consolidated budget of €1.02 billion, while the total education expenditure of all administrations in 2022 was €134 billion, which represented a 10 % of GDP.

The budget can be divided in five main areas:

1. Central services (Program 311M), which funds the Ministry’s central services and administrative structure.
2. Health policy and regulation (311O & 313B), covering general health policy, public health, external health, health quality, and regulatory development.
3. Healthcare and pharmacy services (313A & 313D), which finance the definition and management of healthcare benefits and pharmaceutical policy within the National Health System, including pricing, reimbursement, and organ donation and transplantation.
4. Digital health policy (313E), aimed at promoting digitalisation, data systems and innovation within the National Health System.
5. National Drug Plan (231A), which supports actions focused on drug addiction prevention, treatment, and reducing the social and health impacts of drug use.

In addition, Programme 000X (“Internal Transfers and Disbursements”) is excluded from the analysis, as it consists of transfers between public sector entities and would otherwise lead to double counting and distort the overall budget.

=== Audit ===
The Ministry's accounts, as well as those of its agencies, are internally audited by the Office of the Comptroller General of the State (IGAE), through a Delegated Comptroller's Office within the Department itself. Externally, the Court of Auditors is responsible for auditing expenditures.

Likewise, the Congress of Deputies and Senate health committees and the Congress-Senate Joint Committee on the Study of Addiction Problems, exercise political control over the accounts.

== See also ==
- Civil Order of Health
- History of Spain
- Politics of Spain
- Cabinet of Spain
- List of Spain-related topics
