= Second government of Pedro Sánchez =

2020–2023 government of Spain

2nd government of Pedro Sánchez
- Government of Spain
- 2020–2023
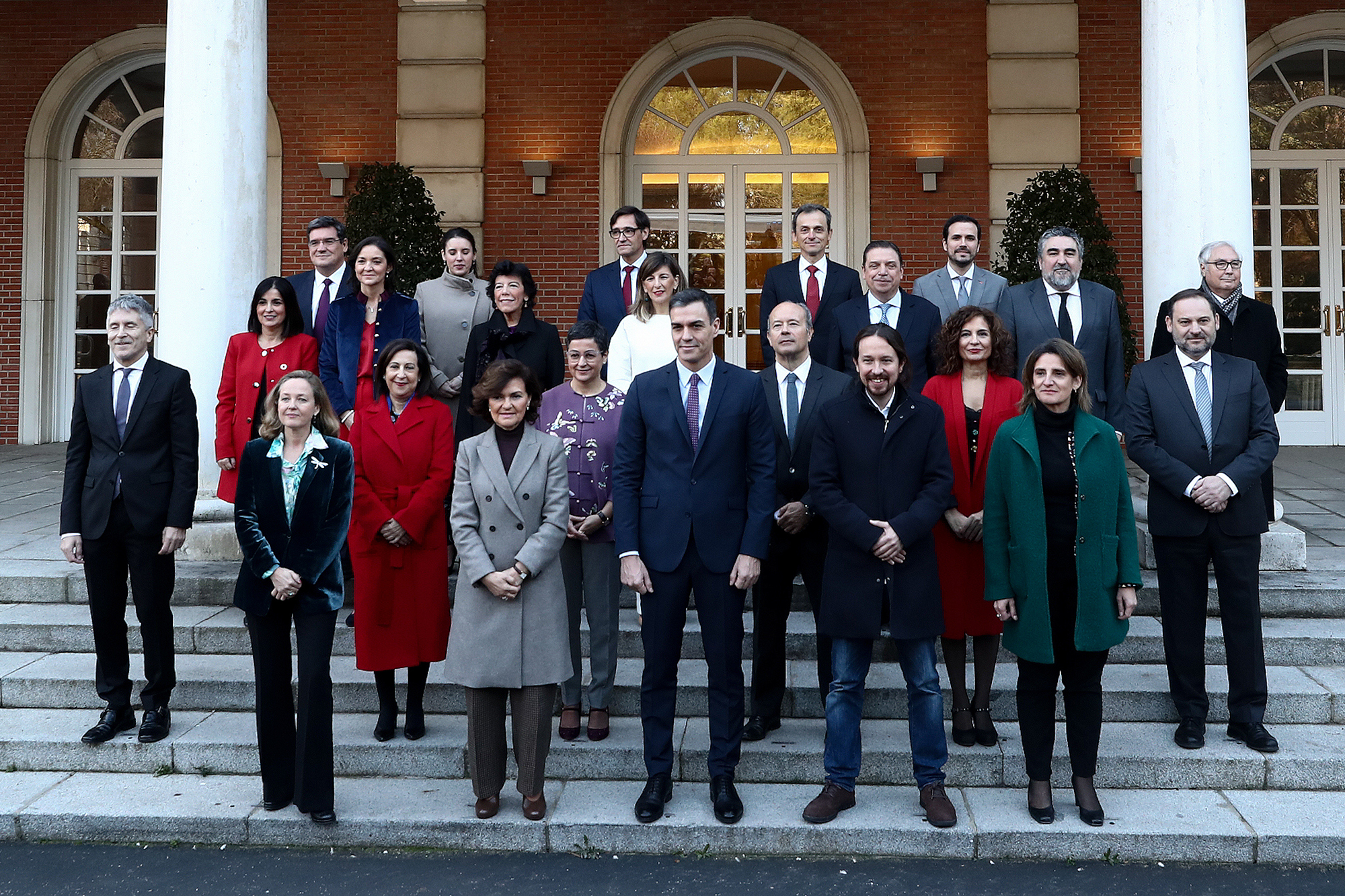
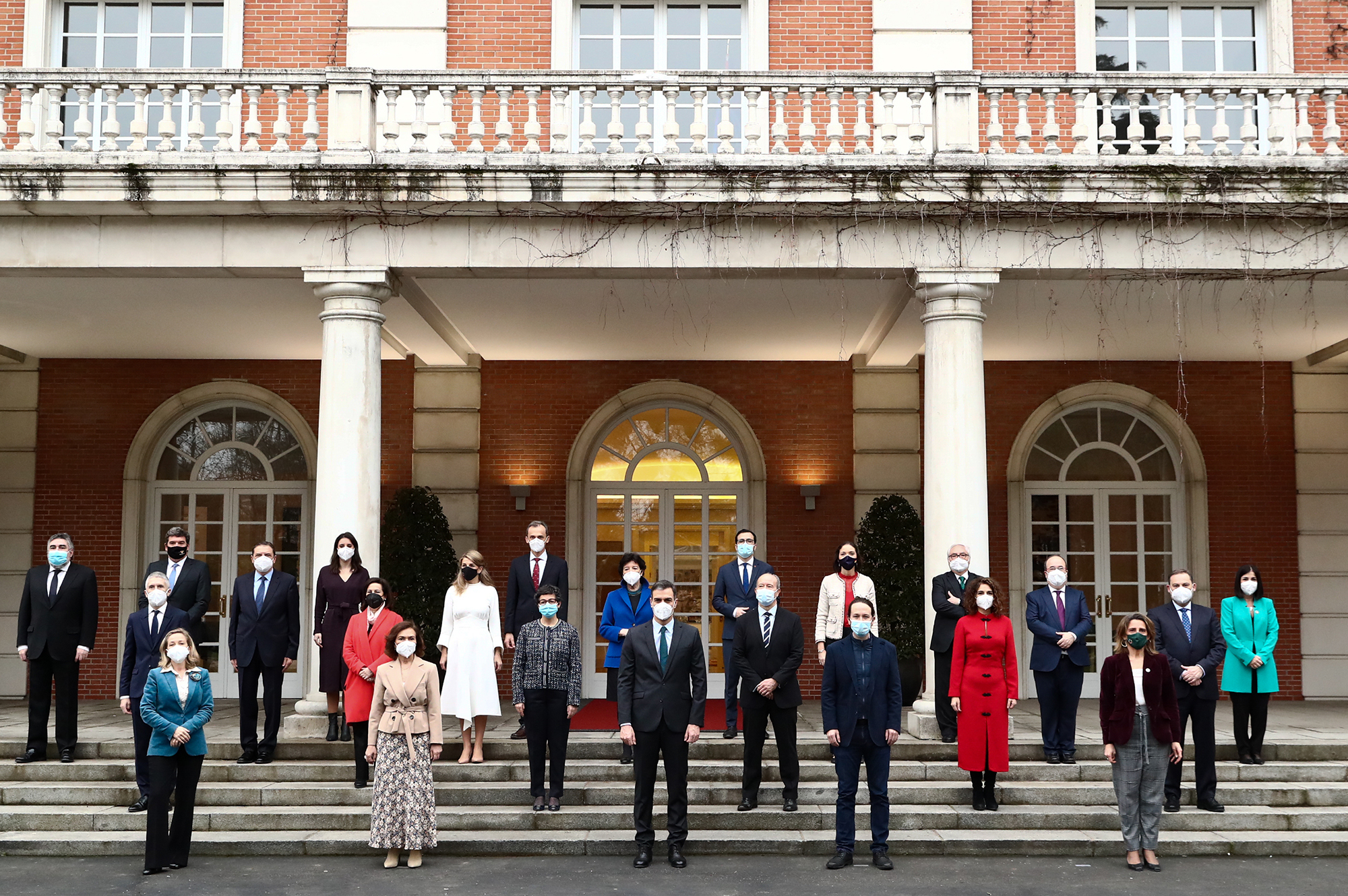
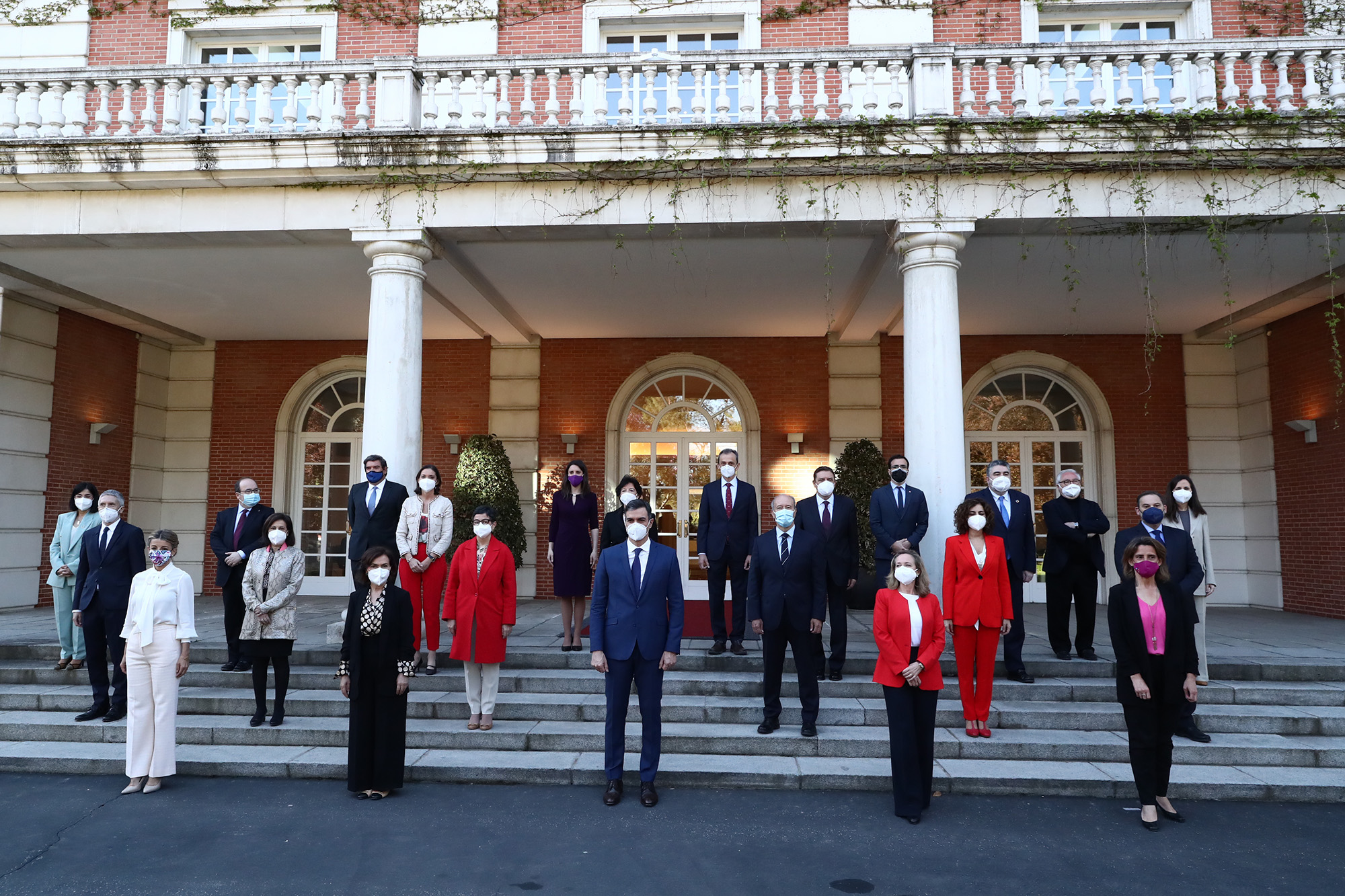
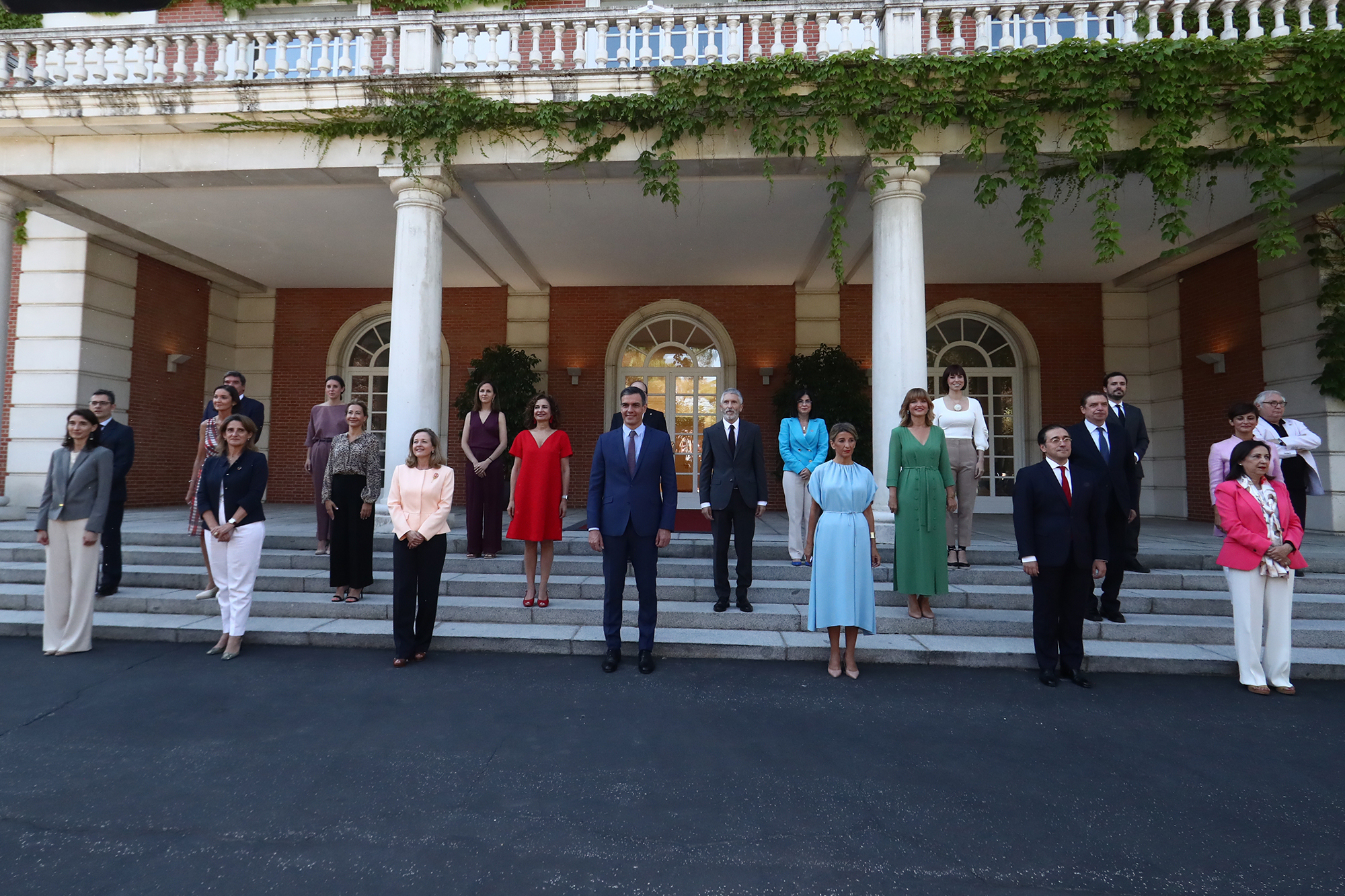
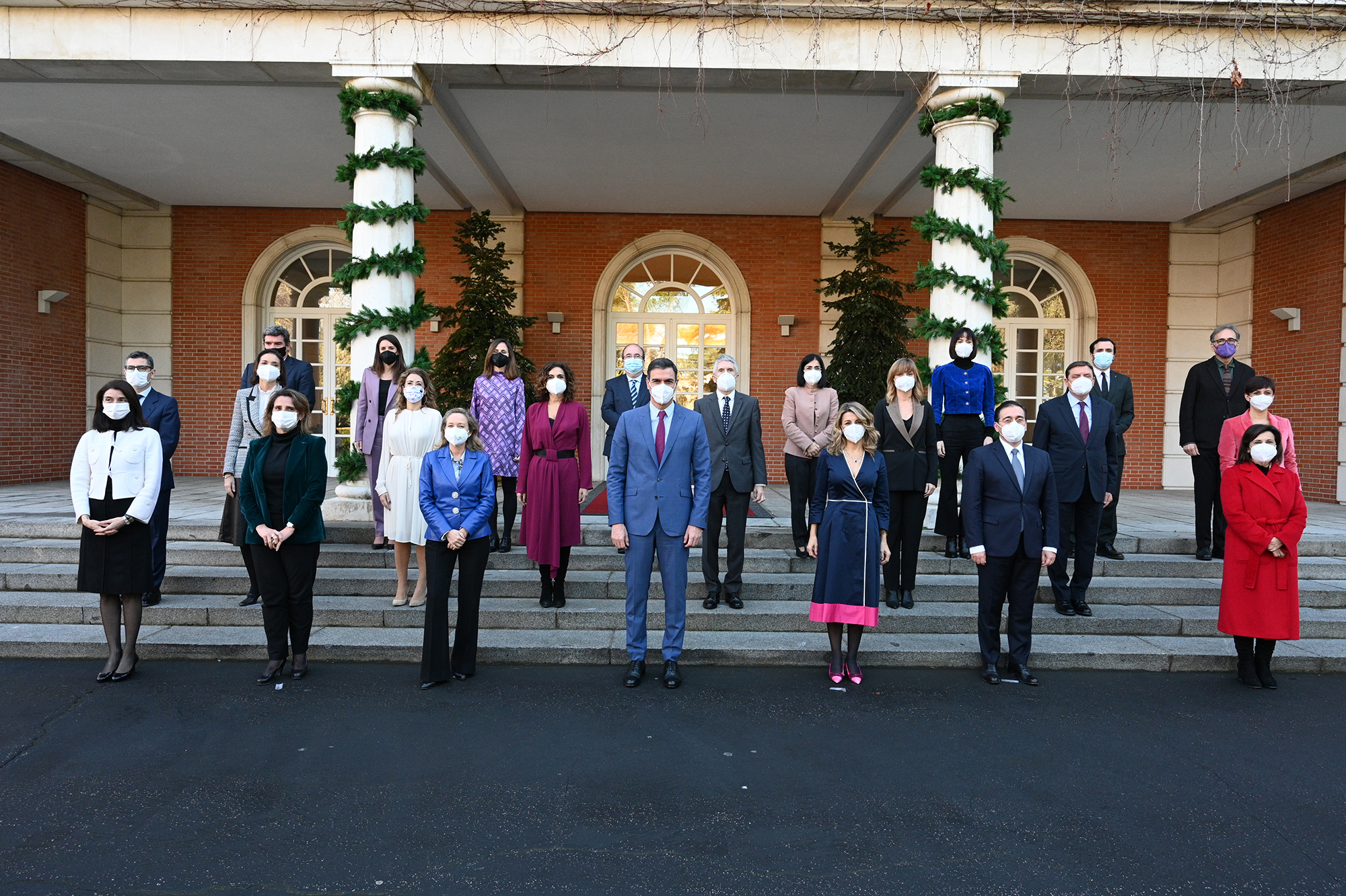
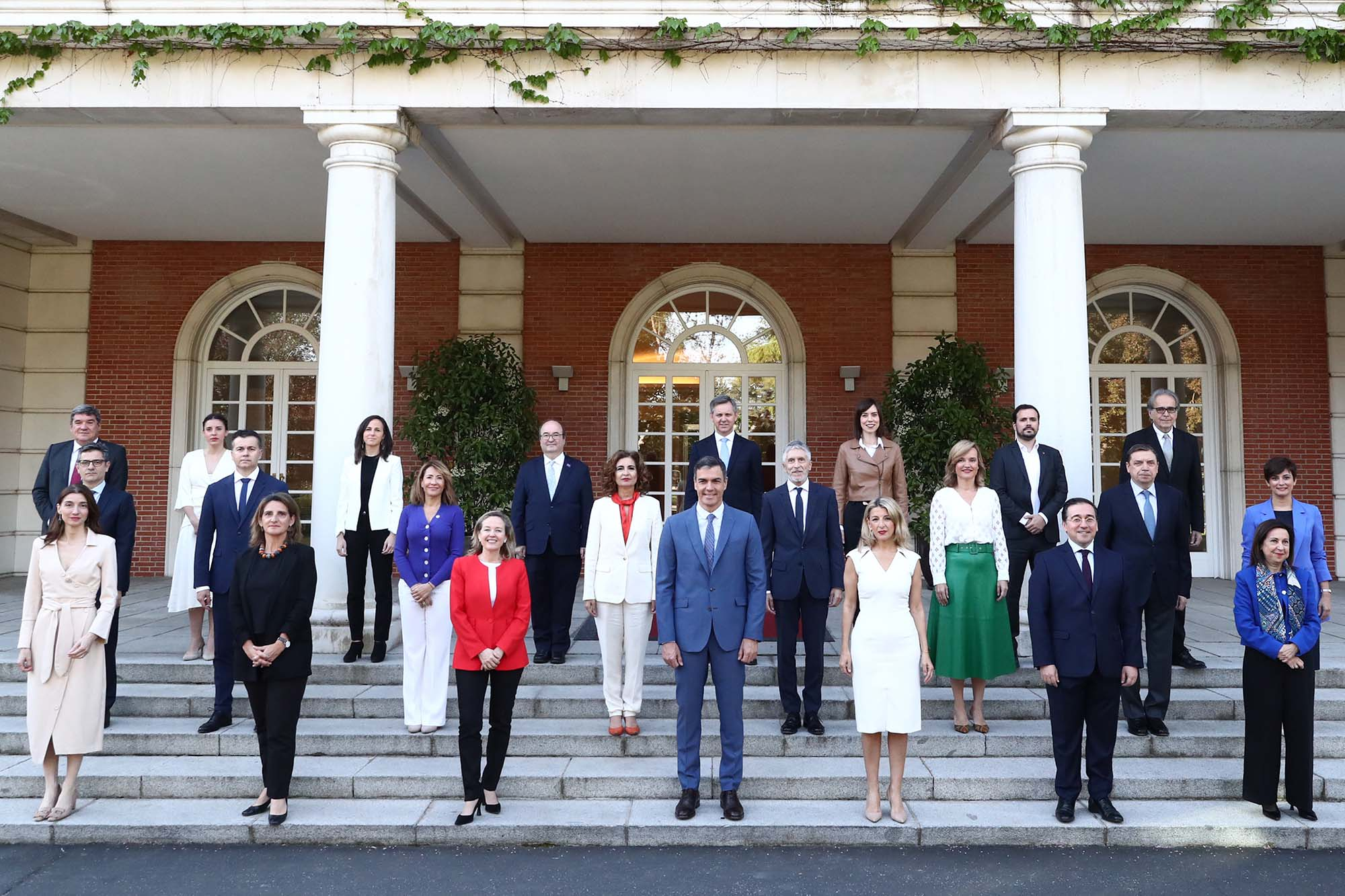
- The government in January 2020 (top left), February 2021 (top right), April 2021 (center left), July 2021 (center right), December 2021 (bottom left) and April 2023 (bottom right)
- Date formed: 13 January 2020
- Date dissolved: 21 November 2023

People and organisations
- Monarch: Felipe VI
- Prime Minister: Pedro Sánchez
- Deputy Prime Ministers: First: Carmen Calvo (2020–2021); Nadia Calviño (2021–2023); Second: Pablo Iglesias (2020–2021); Nadia Calviño (2021); Yolanda Díaz (2021–2023); Third: Nadia Calviño (2020–2021); Yolanda Díaz (2021); Teresa Ribera (2021–2023); Fourth: Teresa Ribera (2020–2021)
- No. of ministers: 22 (Note: Does not include the prime minister.)
- Total no. of members: 33
- Member parties: PSOE; Unidas Podemos (2020–2023); Sumar (2022–2023)
- Status in legislature: Minority (coalition) (2020–2023); Caretaker (2023)
- Opposition party: PP
- Opposition leader: Pablo Casado (2020–2022); Alberto Núñez Feijóo (2022–2023)

History
- Incoming formation: 2019–2020 government formation
- Outgoing formation: 2023 government formation
- Election: November 2019 general election
- Outgoing election: 2023 general election
- Legislature term: 14th Cortes Generales
- Budget: 2021, 2022, 2023
- Predecessor: Sánchez I
- Successor: Sánchez III

The second government of Pedro Sánchez was formed on 13 January 2020, following the latter's election as prime minister of Spain by the Congress of Deputies on 7 January and his swearing-in on 8 January, as a result of the Spanish Socialist Workers' Party (PSOE) emerging as the largest parliamentary force at the November 2019 general election. It succeeded the first Sánchez government and was the government of Spain from 13 January 2020 to 21 November 2023, a total of 1,408 days, or 3 years, 10 months and 8 days.

The cabinet comprised members of the PSOE (including its sister party, the Socialists' Party of Catalonia, PSC) and Unidas Podemos—with the involvement of Podemos, United Left (IU), the Communist Party of Spain (PCE) and Catalonia in Common (CatComú)—as well as independents proposed by both parties, to become the first nationwide coalition government to be formed in Spain since the Second Spanish Republic. It has been alternatively dubbed as the "progressive coalition" (Spanish: coalición progresista), after the name of the political agreement signed by PSOE and Unidas Podemos. It was automatically dismissed on 24 July 2023 as a consequence of the 2023 general election, but remained in acting capacity until the next government was sworn in.

At 22 ministries, it was the second largest cabinet in Spain since the country's transition to democracy, only behind the third Súarez government; the first time that a government includes four deputy prime ministers; and the third oldest government to be formed, with a median age of 54.2 upon its formation. After the July 2021 cabinet reshuffle, the median age of the government lowered to 50, and the proportion of women at ministerial posts increased to 63.6% (14 out of 22).

== Investiture ==
Investiture; Congress of Deputies; Nomination of Pedro Sánchez (PSOE)
Ballot →	5 January 2020	7 January 2020
Required majority →	176 out of 350	Simple
Yes: • PSOE (120); • UP–ECP–GeC (35) (34 on 5 Jan); • PNV (6); • Más País (2); • Compromís (1); • NCa (1); • BNG (1); • TE (1)	166 / 350	167 / 350
No: • PP (88); • Vox (52); • Cs (10); • JxCat (8); • CUP (2); • NA+ (2); • CCa (1); • PRC (1); • FAC (1)	165 / 350	165 / 350
Abstentions: • ERC (13); • EH Bildu (5)	18 / 350	18 / 350
Absentees: • UP–ECP–GeC (1) (on 5 Jan)	1 / 350	0 / 350

== Votes of confidence/no confidence ==
Motion of no confidence Congress of Deputies; Nomination of Santiago Abascal (Vox)
Ballot →	22 October 2020
Required majority →	176 out of 350
Yes: • Vox (52)	52 / 350
No: • PSOE (120); • PP (88); • UP–ECP–GeC (35); • ERC (13); • Cs (10); • PNV (6); • EH Bildu (5); • JxCat (4); • PDeCAT (4); • Más País (2); • CUP (2); • UPN (2); • Compromís (1); • CCa (1); • NCa (1); • BNG (1); • PRC (1); • FAC (1); • TE (1)	298 / 350
Abstentions	0 / 350
Absentees	0 / 350

Motion of no confidence Congress of Deputies; Nomination of Ramón Tamames (Independent)
Ballot →	22 March 2023
Required majority →	175 out of 349 (Note: Due to the vacancy of Unidas Podemos MP Alberto Rodríguez's seat, the effective absolute majority was at 175.)
Yes: • Vox (52); • INDEP (1)	53 / 350
No: • PSOE (120); • UP–ECP–GeC (30); • ERC (13); • CS (9); • PNV (6); • EH Bildu (4); • JxCat (4); • PDeCAT (4); • Más País (2); • CUP (2); • CCa (2); • Compromís (1); • BNG (1); • PRC (1); • TE (1); • INDEP (1)	201 / 350
Abstentions: • PP (88); • PN (2); • Foro (1)	91 / 350
Absentees: • UP–ECP–GeC (3); • EH Bildu (1)	4 / 350

== Cabinet changes ==
Sánchez's second government saw a number of cabinet changes during its tenure:

- On 30 December 2020, it was announced that Salvador Illa would be stepping down as Minister of Health in order to run as the Socialists' Party of Catalonia (PSC)'s leading candidate for President of the Government of Catalonia in the upcoming 2021 Catalan regional election. Minister of Territorial Policy and Civil Service Carolina Darias was proposed to replace him in his post due to her knowledge and cooperation in Illa's ministry's management of the COVID-19 pandemic, whereas outgoing PSC candidate Miquel Iceta was commented as a likely pick for Darias's former ministry.
- After the surprise announcement on 10 March 2021 by Madrilenian president Isabel Díaz Ayuso to expel Citizens (Cs) from her government and call a snap election in the Community of Madrid for 4 May, as a result of a foiled attempt from both PSOE and Cs to bring down the Murcian government of Fernando López Miras, the second deputy prime minister Pablo Iglesias announced that he would be stepping down in shortly from his cabinet posts in order to run as the Unidas Podemos leading candidate in the regional election. Iglesias pointed to Labour and Social Economy minister Yolanda Díaz as his successor in the Unidas Podemos leadership, whereas State Secretary for the 2030 Agenda, Ione Belarra, would replace him at the helm of the Ministry of Social Rights and 2030 Agenda. Díaz would be appointed as new third deputy prime minister as a way to compensate for her strong labour portfolio, whereas Nadia Calviño was to ascend as new second deputy.
- On 10 July 2021, Pedro Sánchez unveiled one of the largest cabinet reshuffles in Spanish democracy: seven ministers—Carmen Calvo (First Deputy and Presidency), Arancha González Laya (Foreign Affairs), Juan Carlos Campo (Justice), José Luis Ábalos (Transport), Isabel Celaá (Education), José Manuel Rodríguez Uribes (Culture) and Pedro Duque (Science)—were replaced by new officeholders, with further two ministries (Finance and Territorial Policy) seeing changes in their structures, with civil service competences being transferred from the latter to the former, as well as the office of the spokesperson of the Government. After Calvo's dismissal from the cabinet, the third remaining deputy prime ministers (Nadia Calviño, Yolanda Díaz and Teresa Ribera) were promoted, with the post of the fourth deputy prime minister being disestablished. The changes were effective from 12 July, with the new ministers taking their posts on that day.
- On 16 December 2021, Manuel Castells announced his will to resign as Ministry of Universities due to health concerns, being replaced in the post on 20 December by Joan Subirats, former councillor in the City Council of Barcelona under mayoress Ada Colau.
- On 14 and 17 November 2022, Industry and Health ministers Reyes Maroto and Carolina Darias were announced as PSOE candidates for the mayorships of Madrid and Las Palmas de Gran Canaria, respectively. They were both replaced in their posts by Héctor Gómez and José Miñones on 28 March 2023, one week ahead of the official call of the 28 May local elections.

== Council of Ministers ==
The Council of Ministers is structured into the offices for the prime minister, the four deputy prime ministers, 22 ministries and the post of the spokesperson of the Government. From July 2021, the Council would include only three deputy prime ministers.

← Sánchez II Government → (13 January 2020 – 21 November 2023)
Portfolio	Name	Party	Took office	Left office	Ref.
Prime Minister	Pedro Sánchez	PSOE	8 January 2020	17 November 2023	
First Deputy Prime Minister; Minister of the Presidency, Relations with the Cortes and Democratic Memory	Carmen Calvo	PSOE	13 January 2020	12 July 2021	
Second Deputy Prime Minister; Minister of Social Rights and 2030 Agenda	Pablo Iglesias	UP^{/Podemos}	13 January 2020	31 March 2021	
Third Deputy Prime Minister; Minister of Economic Affairs and Digital Transformation	Nadia Calviño	Independent	13 January 2020	31 March 2021	
Fourth Deputy Prime Minister; Minister for the Ecological Transition and the Demographic Challenge	Teresa Ribera	PSOE	13 January 2020	12 July 2021	
Minister of Foreign Affairs, European Union and Cooperation	Arancha González Laya	Independent	13 January 2020	12 July 2021	
Minister of Justice	Juan Carlos Campo	Independent	13 January 2020	12 July 2021	
Minister of Defence	Margarita Robles	Independent	13 January 2020	21 November 2023	
Minister of Finance; Spokesperson of the Government	María Jesús Montero	PSOE	13 January 2020	12 July 2021	
Minister of the Interior	Fernando Grande-Marlaska	Independent	13 January 2020	21 November 2023	
Minister of Transport, Mobility and Urban Agenda	José Luis Ábalos	PSOE	13 January 2020	12 July 2021	
Minister of Education and Vocational Training	Isabel Celaá	PSOE	13 January 2020	12 July 2021	
Minister of Labour and Social Economy	Yolanda Díaz	UP^{/PCE}	13 January 2020	21 November 2023	
Minister of Industry, Trade and Tourism	Reyes Maroto	PSOE	13 January 2020	28 March 2023	
Minister of Agriculture, Fisheries and Food	Luis Planas	PSOE	13 January 2020	21 November 2023	
Minister of Territorial Policy and Civil Service	Carolina Darias	PSOE	13 January 2020	27 January 2021	
Minister of Culture and Sports	José Manuel Rodríguez Uribes	PSOE	13 January 2020	12 July 2021	
Minister of Health	Salvador Illa	PSOE^{/PSC}	13 January 2020	27 January 2021	
Minister of Science and Innovation	Pedro Duque	Independent	13 January 2020	12 July 2021	
Minister of Equality	Irene Montero	UP^{/Podemos}	13 January 2020	21 November 2023	
Minister of Consumer Affairs	Alberto Garzón	UP^{/IU}	13 January 2020	21 November 2023	
Minister of Inclusion, Social Security and Migration	José Luis Escrivá	Independent	13 January 2020	21 November 2023	
Minister of Universities	Manuel Castells	Independent	13 January 2020	20 December 2021	
=== Changes January 2021 ===
Portfolio	Name	Party	Took office	Left office	Ref.
Minister of Territorial Policy and Civil Service	Miquel Iceta	PSOE^{/PSC}	27 January 2021	12 July 2021	
Minister of Health	Carolina Darias	PSOE	27 January 2021	28 March 2023	
=== Changes March 2021 ===
Portfolio	Name	Party	Took office	Left office	Ref.
Second Deputy Prime Minister; Minister of Economic Affairs and Digital Transformation	Nadia Calviño	Independent	31 March 2021	12 July 2021	
Third Deputy Prime Minister; Minister of Labour and Social Economy	Yolanda Díaz	UP^{/PCE}	31 March 2021	12 July 2021	
Minister of Social Rights and 2030 Agenda	Ione Belarra	UP^{/Podemos}	31 March 2021	21 November 2023	
=== Changes July 2021 ===
Portfolio	Name	Party	Took office	Left office	Ref.
First Deputy Prime Minister (Note: On 12 July 2021, the ministries of Finance and Territorial Policy and Civil Service were reorganized as the Finance and Civil Service and Territorial Policy departments, respectively. Concurrently, following Carmen Calvo's dismissal as First Deputy Prime Minister, the second, third and fourth deputy prime ministers were promoted to the posts of first, second and third deputy prime ministers, respectively, with the post of fourth deputy prime minister being discontinued.); Minister of Economic Affairs and Digital Transformation	Nadia Calviño	Independent	12 July 2021	21 November 2023	
Second Deputy Prime Minister; Minister of Labour and Social Economy	Yolanda Díaz	UP^{/PCE}	12 July 2021	21 November 2023	
Third Deputy Prime Minister; Minister for the Ecological Transition and the Demographic Challenge	Teresa Ribera	PSOE	12 July 2021	21 November 2023	
~~Fourth Deputy Prime Minister~~	Discontinued on 12 July 2021.				
Minister of Foreign Affairs, European Union and Cooperation	José Manuel Albares	PSOE	12 July 2021	21 November 2023	
Minister of Justice	Pilar Llop	PSOE	12 July 2021	21 November 2023	
Minister of Finance and Civil Service	María Jesús Montero	PSOE	12 July 2021	21 November 2023	
Minister of Transport, Mobility and Urban Agenda	Raquel Sánchez	PSOE^{/PSC}	12 July 2021	21 November 2023	
Minister of Education and Vocational Training	Pilar Alegría	PSOE	12 July 2021	21 November 2023	
Minister of the Presidency, Relations with the Cortes and Democratic Memory	Félix Bolaños	PSOE	12 July 2021	21 November 2023	
Minister of Territorial Policy; Spokesperson of the Government	Isabel Rodríguez	PSOE	12 July 2021	21 November 2023	
Minister of Culture and Sports	Miquel Iceta	PSOE^{/PSC}	12 July 2021	21 November 2023	
Minister of Science and Innovation	Diana Morant	PSOE	12 July 2021	21 November 2023	
=== Changes December 2021 ===
Portfolio	Name	Party	Took office	Left office	Ref.
Minister of Universities	Joan Subirats	UP^{/CatComú}	20 December 2021	21 November 2023	
=== Changes March 2023 ===
Portfolio	Name	Party	Took office	Left office	Ref.
Minister of Industry, Trade and Tourism	Héctor Gómez	PSOE	28 March 2023	21 November 2023	
Minister of Health	José Miñones	PSOE	28 March 2023	21 November 2023	

== Departmental structure ==
Pedro Sánchez's second government is organised into several superior and governing units, whose number, powers and hierarchical structure may vary depending on the ministerial department.

Unit/body rank

- (■) Secretary of state
- (■) Undersecretary
- (■) Director-general
- (●) Autonomous agency
- (◆) Military & intelligence agency

Office (Original name)	Portrait	Name	Took office	Left office	Alliance/party	Ref.
=== Prime Minister's Office ===
Prime Minister (Presidencia del Gobierno)		Pedro Sánchez	8 January 2020	17 November 2023	PSOE	
Prime Minister (Presidencia del Gobierno)	28 January 2020 – 27 July 2021: (■) Cabinet of the Prime Minister's Office–Chief of Staff; (■) General Secretariat of the Prime Minister's Office; (■) Deputy General Secretariat; (■) Department of Protocol; (■) Department of Security; (■) Department of Planning and Monitoring of Government Activity; (■) Deputy Chief of Staff; (■) Department of National Affairs; (■) Department of Institutional Affairs; (■) Department of Analysis and Studies; (■) Department of Political Affairs; (■) General Secretariat of Economic Affairs and G20 (est. 1 Jan 2021); (■) Department of National Security; (■) Department of Economic Affairs and G20 (disest. 1 Jan 2021); (■) Department of Foreign Affairs; (■) Department of European Union; (■) National Office for Foresight and Long-Term Country Strategy; (■) State Secretariat for Press; (■) Department of National Information; (■) Department of International Information; (■) Department of Regional Information; (■) Department of Economic Information; (■) Digital Department; (■) High Commissioner for the Fight against Child Poverty; (■) Office of the High Commissioner for the Fight against Child Poverty; (■) High Commissioner for Spain Entrepreneurial Nation; (■) Office of the High Commissioner for Spain Entrepreneurial Nation; 27 July 2021 – 14 February 2023: (■) Cabinet of the Prime Minister's Office–Chief of Staff; (■) General Secretariat of the Prime Minister's Office; (■) Department of Technical and Legal Coordination; (■) Department of Protocol; (■) Department of Security; (■) Deputy Chief of Staff; (■) Department of Public Policies; (■) Department of Institutional Affairs; (■) Department of Foreign Affairs; (■) Department of European Union (disest. 28 Oct 2021); (■) General Secretariat of Economic Affairs and G20; (■) Coordination Office for the Spanish Presidency of the European Union (est. 28 Oct 2021); (■) General Secretariat of Political Planning (est. 1 Aug 2022); (■) Department of National Security; (■) National Office for Foresight and Long-Term Country Strategy; (■) Department of Analysis and Studies; (■) State Secretariat for Press; (■) Department of National Information; (■) Department of International Information; (■) Department of Regional Information; (■) Digital Department; (■) Department of Information Coordination (est. 13 Jan 2022); (■) High Commissioner for the Fight against Child Poverty; (■) Office of the High Commissioner for the Fight against Child Poverty; (■) High Commissioner for Spain Entrepreneurial Nation; (■) Office of the High Commissioner for Spain Entrepreneurial Nation; 14 February – 28 November 2023: (■) Cabinet of the Prime Minister's Office–Chief of Staff; (■) General Secretariat of the Prime Minister's Office; (■) Department of Technical and Legal Coordination; (■) Department of Protocol; (■) Department of Security; (■) Deputy Chief of Staff; (■) Department of Public Policies; (■) Department of Institutional Affairs; (■) Department of Foreign Affairs; (■) General Secretariat of Economic Affairs and G20; (■) Coordination Office for the Spanish Presidency of the European Union; (■) General Secretariat of Political Planning; (■) National Office for Foresight and Country Strategy; (■) Department of National Security; (■) Department of Analysis and Studies; (■) State Secretariat for Press; (■) Department of National Information; (■) Department of International Information; (■) Department of Regional Information; (■) Digital Department; (■) Department of Information Coordination; (■) High Commissioner for the Fight against Child Poverty; (■) Office of the High Commissioner for the Fight against Child Poverty					
First Deputy Prime Minister (Vicepresidencia Primera del Gobierno)		Carmen Calvo	13 January 2020	12 July 2021	PSOE	
First Deputy Prime Minister (Vicepresidencia Primera del Gobierno)		Nadia Calviño	12 July 2021	21 November 2023	PSOE (Independent)	
First Deputy Prime Minister (Vicepresidencia Primera del Gobierno)	See Ministry of the Presidency, Relations with the Cortes and Democratic Memory (13 January 2020 – 12 July 2021); See Ministry of Economic Affairs and Digital Transformation (12 July 2021 – 21 November 2023)					
Second Deputy Prime Minister (Vicepresidencia Segunda del Gobierno)		Pablo Iglesias	13 January 2020	31 March 2021	Unidas Podemos (Podemos)	
Second Deputy Prime Minister (Vicepresidencia Segunda del Gobierno)		Nadia Calviño	31 March 2021	12 July 2021	PSOE (Independent)	
Second Deputy Prime Minister (Vicepresidencia Segunda del Gobierno)		Yolanda Díaz	12 July 2021	21 November 2023	Unidas Podemos/Sumar (PCE)	
Second Deputy Prime Minister (Vicepresidencia Segunda del Gobierno)	See Ministry of Social Rights and 2030 Agenda (13 January 2020 – 31 March 2021); See Ministry of Economic Affairs and Digital Transformation (31 March – 12 July 2021); See Ministry of Labour and Social Economy (12 July 2021 – 21 November 2023)					
Third Deputy Prime Minister (Vicepresidencia Tercera del Gobierno)		Nadia Calviño	13 January 2020	31 March 2021	PSOE (Independent)	
Third Deputy Prime Minister (Vicepresidencia Tercera del Gobierno)		Yolanda Díaz	31 March 2021	12 July 2021	Unidas Podemos (PCE)	
Third Deputy Prime Minister (Vicepresidencia Tercera del Gobierno)		Teresa Ribera	12 July 2021	21 November 2023	PSOE	
Third Deputy Prime Minister (Vicepresidencia Tercera del Gobierno)	See Ministry of Economic Affairs and Digital Transformation (13 January 2020 – 31 March 2021); See Ministry of Labour and Social Economy (31 March – 12 July 2021); See Ministry for the Ecological Transition and the Demographic Challenge (12 July 2021 – 21 November 2023)					
Fourth Deputy Prime Minister (Vicepresidencia Cuarta del Gobierno) (until 12 July 2021)		Teresa Ribera	13 January 2020	12 July 2021	PSOE	
Fourth Deputy Prime Minister (Vicepresidencia Cuarta del Gobierno) (until 12 July 2021)	See Ministry for the Ecological Transition and the Demographic Challenge					
=== Ministry of Foreign Affairs, European Union and Cooperation ===
Ministry of Foreign Affairs, European Union and Cooperation (Ministerio de Asuntos Exteriores, Unión Europea y Cooperación)		Arancha González Laya	13 January 2020	12 July 2021	PSOE (Independent)	
Ministry of Foreign Affairs, European Union and Cooperation (Ministerio de Asuntos Exteriores, Unión Europea y Cooperación)		José Manuel Albares	12 July 2021	21 November 2023	PSOE	
Ministry of Foreign Affairs, European Union and Cooperation (Ministerio de Asuntos Exteriores, Unión Europea y Cooperación)	29 January 2020 – 17 July 2021: (■) State Secretariat for Foreign Affairs and for Ibero-America and the Caribbean; (■) Directorate-General for Foreign Policy and Security; (■) Directorate-General for the United Nations and Human Rights (disest. 8 Jul 2020); (■) Directorate-General for the United Nations, International Organizations and Human Rights (est. 8 Jul 2020); (■) Directorate-General for Ibero-America and the Caribbean; (■) Directorate-General for the Maghreb, the Mediterranean and the Middle East; (■) Directorate-General for Africa; (■) Directorate-General for North America, Eastern Europe, Asia and the Pacific; (■) State Secretariat for the European Union; (■) Directorate-General for Integration and Coordination of General Affairs of the European Union; (■) Directorate-General for Coordination of the Internal Market and other European Union Policies; (■) Directorate-General for Western, Central and South East Europe; (■) State Secretariat for International Cooperation; (■) Directorate-General for Sustainable Development Policies; (■) State Secretariat for Global Spain; (■) Directorate-General for Strategy, Foresight and Coherence; (■) Directorate-General for Economic Diplomacy; (■) Directorate-General for Communication, Public Diplomacy and Media; (■) Undersecretariat of Foreign Affairs, European Union and Cooperation; (■) Technical General Secretariat; (■) Directorate-General for the Foreign Service; (■) Directorate-General for Spaniards Abroad and Consular Affairs; (■) Directorate-General for Protocol, Chancery and Orders–Introducer of Ambassadors; 17 July – 22 September 2021: (■) State Secretariat for Foreign and Global Affairs; (■) Directorate-General for Foreign Policy and Security; (■) Directorate-General for the United Nations, International Organizations and Human Rights; (■) Directorate-General for the Maghreb, the Mediterranean and the Middle East; (■) Directorate-General for Africa; (■) Directorate-General for North America, Eastern Europe, Asia and the Pacific; (■) State Secretariat for the European Union; (■) Directorate-General for Integration and Coordination of General Affairs of the European Union; (■) Directorate-General for Coordination of the Internal Market and other European Union Policies; (■) Directorate-General for Western, Central and South East Europe; (■) State Secretariat for International Cooperation; (■) Directorate-General for Sustainable Development Policies; (■) State Secretariat for Ibero-America and the Caribbean and the Spanish in the World; (■) Directorate-General for Ibero-America and the Caribbean; (■) Directorate-General for Strategy, Foresight and Coherence; (■) Directorate-General for Economic Diplomacy; (■) Directorate-General for Communication, Public Diplomacy and Media; (■) Undersecretariat of Foreign Affairs, European Union and Cooperation; (■) Technical General Secretariat; (■) Directorate-General for the Foreign Service; (■) Directorate-General for Spaniards Abroad and Consular Affairs; (■) Directorate-General for Protocol, Chancery and Orders; 22 September 2021 – 6 December 2023: (■) State Secretariat for Foreign and Global Affairs; (■) Directorate-General for Foreign Policy and Security; (■) Directorate-General for the United Nations, International Organizations and Human Rights; (■) Directorate-General for the Maghreb, the Mediterranean and the Middle East; (■) Directorate-General for Africa; (■) Directorate-General for North America, Eastern Europe, Asia and the Pacific; (■) State Secretariat for the European Union; (■) General Secretariat for the European Union; (■) Directorate-General for Integration and Coordination of General Affairs of the European Union; (■) Directorate-General for Coordination of the Internal Market and other European Union Policies; (■) Directorate-General for Western, Central and South East Europe; (■) State Secretariat for Ibero-America and the Caribbean and the Spanish in the World; (■) Directorate-General for Ibero-America and the Caribbean; (■) Directorate-General for the Spanish in the World; (■) State Secretariat for International Cooperation; (■) Directorate-General for Sustainable Development Policies; (■) Undersecretariat of Foreign Affairs, European Union and Cooperation; (■) Technical General Secretariat; (■) Directorate-General for the Foreign Service; (■) Directorate-General for Spaniards Abroad and Consular Affairs; (■) Directorate-General for Protocol, Chancery and Orders; (■) Directorate-General for Economic Diplomacy; (■) Directorate-General for Communication, Public Diplomacy and Media					
=== Ministry of Justice ===
Ministry of Justice (Ministerio de Justicia)		Juan Carlos Campo	13 January 2020	12 July 2021	PSOE (Independent)	
Ministry of Justice (Ministerio de Justicia)		Pilar Llop	12 July 2021	21 November 2023	PSOE	
Ministry of Justice (Ministerio de Justicia)	29 January 2020 – 28 December 2022: (■) State Secretariat for Justice; (■) General Secretariat for Innovation and Quality of the Public Justice Service; (■) Directorate-General for the Public Justice Service; (■) Directorate-General for Digital Transformation of the Administration of Justice; (■) Directorate-General for Legal Security and Public Faith; (■) Directorate-General for International Legal Cooperation and Human Rights; (■) Undersecretariat of Justice; (■) Technical General Secretariat; (■) Office of the Solicitor General of the State–Directorate of the State Legal Service; 28 December 2022 – 6 December 2023: (■) State Secretariat for Justice; (■) General Secretariat for Innovation and Quality of the Public Justice Service; (■) Directorate-General for the Public Justice Service; (■) Directorate-General for Digital Transformation of the Administration of Justice; (■) Directorate-General for Legal Security and Public Faith; (■) Directorate-General for International Legal Cooperation and Human Rights; (■) Undersecretariat of Justice; (■) Technical General Secretariat; (■) Office of the Solicitor General of the State; (■) Directorate-General for Consultation; (■) Directorate-General for Litigation					
=== Ministry of Defence ===
Ministry of Defence (Ministerio de Defensa)		Margarita Robles	13 January 2020	21 November 2023	PSOE (Independent)	
Ministry of Defence (Ministerio de Defensa)	29 January 2020 – 6 December 2023: (■) State Secretariat for Defence; (■) Directorate-General for Armament and Materiel; (■) Directorate-General for Economic Affairs; (■) Directorate-General for Infrastructure; (■) Information and Communication Systems and Technologies Centre (est. 10 Feb 2023); (■) Undersecretariat of Defence; (■) Technical General Secretariat; (■) Directorate-General for Personnel; (■) Directorate-General for Military Recruitment and Teaching; (■) General Secretariat for Defence Policy; (■) Directorate-General for Defence Policy; (◆) Armed Forces; (■) Defence Staff–Chief of the Defence Staff; (■) Army–Chief of Staff of the Army; (■) Navy–Chief of Staff of the Navy; (■) Air Force–Chief of Staff of the Air Force; (◆) National Intelligence Centre; (■) State Secretariat–Directorate of the National Intelligence Centre; (■) General Secretariat of the National Intelligence Centre; (■) Technical Directorate for Resources; (■) Technical Directorate for Intelligence; (■) Technical Directorate for Intelligence Support					
=== Ministry of Finance ===
Ministry of Finance (Ministerio de Hacienda) (until 12 July 2021) Ministry of Finance and Civil Service (Ministerio de Hacienda y Función Pública) (from 12 July 2021)		María Jesús Montero	13 January 2020	21 November 2023	PSOE	
Ministry of Finance (Ministerio de Hacienda) (until 12 July 2021) Ministry of Finance and Civil Service (Ministerio de Hacienda y Función Pública) (from 12 July 2021)	29 January 2020 – 12 July 2021: (■) State Secretariat for Finance; (■) General Secretariat for Regional and Local Financing; (■) Directorate-General for Budgetary Stability and Territorial Financial Management (est. 22 Jul 2020); (■) Directorate-General for Taxes; (■) Directorate-General for the Cadastre; (■) Central Economic-Administrative Court; (■) State Secretariat for Budgets and Expenditure; (■) General Secretariat for European Funds (est. 31 Dec 2020); (■) Directorate-General for European Funds (from 31 Dec 2020); (■) Directorate-General for the Recovery and Resilience Plan and Mechanism (est. 31 Dec 2020); (■) Directorate-General for Budgets; (■) Directorate-General for Personnel Costs; (■) Directorate-General for European Funds (until 31 Dec 2020); (■) Undersecretariat of Finance; (■) Office of the Comptroller General of the State Administration; (■) Technical General Secretariat; (■) Directorate-General for the State Heritage; (■) Inspectorate-General; (■) Directorate-General for Rationalization and Centralization of Contracting; 12 July – 4 August 2021: (■) State Secretariat for Finance; (■) General Secretariat for Regional and Local Financing; (■) Directorate-General for Budgetary Stability and Territorial Financial Management; (■) Directorate-General for Taxes; (■) Directorate-General for the Cadastre; (■) Central Economic-Administrative Court; (■) State Secretariat for Budgets and Expenditure; (■) General Secretariat for European Funds; (■) Directorate-General for European Funds; (■) Directorate-General for the Recovery and Resilience Plan and Mechanism; (■) Directorate-General for Budgets; (■) Directorate-General for Personnel Costs; (■) State Secretariat for the Civil Service; (■) General Secretariat for the Civil Service; (■) Directorate-General for the Civil Service; (■) Directorate-General for Public Governance; (■) Office for Conflicts of Interest; (■) Undersecretariat of Finance and Civil Service; (■) Office of the Comptroller General of the State Administration; (■) Technical General Secretariat; (■) Directorate-General for the State Heritage; (■) Inspectorate-General; (■) Directorate-General for Rationalization and Centralization of Contracting; 4 August 2021 – 6 December 2023: (■) State Secretariat for Finance; (■) General Secretariat for Regional and Local Financing; (■) Directorate-General for Budgetary Stability and Territorial Financial Management; (■) Directorate-General for Taxes; (■) Directorate-General for the Cadastre; (■) Central Economic-Administrative Court; (■) State Secretariat for Budgets and Expenditure; (■) General Secretariat for European Funds; (■) Directorate-General for European Funds; (■) Directorate-General for the Recovery and Resilience Plan and Mechanism; (■) Directorate-General for Budgets; (■) Directorate-General for Personnel Costs; (■) State Secretariat for the Civil Service; (■) Directorate-General for the Civil Service; (■) Directorate-General for Public Governance; (■) Office for Conflicts of Interest; (■) Undersecretariat of Finance and Civil Service; (■) Office of the Comptroller General of the State Administration; (■) Technical General Secretariat; (■) Directorate-General for the State Heritage; (■) Inspectorate-General; (■) Directorate-General for Rationalization and Centralization of Contracting					
=== Ministry of the Interior ===
Ministry of the Interior (Ministerio del Interior)		Fernando Grande-Marlaska	13 January 2020	21 November 2023	PSOE (Independent)	
Ministry of the Interior (Ministerio del Interior)	29 January 2020 – 6 December 2023: (■) State Secretariat for Security; (■) Directorate-General of the Police; (■) Directorate-General of the Civil Guard; (■) Directorate-General for International Relations and Foreigners; (■) Directorate-General for Coordination and Studies (est. 12 Mar 2021); (■) General Secretariat for Penitentiary Institutions; (■) Directorate-General for Criminal Enforcement and Social Reintegration; (■) Undersecretariat of the Interior; (■) Technical General Secretariat; (■) Directorate-General for Internal Policy; (■) Directorate-General for Traffic; (■) Directorate-General for Civil Protection and Emergencies; (■) Directorate-General for Support to Victims of Terrorism					
=== Ministry of Transport, Mobility and Urban Agenda ===
Ministry of Transport, Mobility and Urban Agenda (Ministerio de Transportes, Movilidad y Agenda Urbana)		José Luis Ábalos	13 January 2020	12 July 2021	PSOE	
Ministry of Transport, Mobility and Urban Agenda (Ministerio de Transportes, Movilidad y Agenda Urbana)		Raquel Sánchez	12 July 2021	21 November 2023	PSOE (PSC–PSOE)	
Ministry of Transport, Mobility and Urban Agenda (Ministerio de Transportes, Movilidad y Agenda Urbana)	29 January 2020 – 6 December 2023: (■) State Secretariat for Transport, Mobility and Urban Agenda; (■) General Secretariat for Infrastructure; (■) Directorate-General for Roads; (■) Directorate-General for Planning and Evaluation of the Railway Network; (■) General Secretariat for Transport and Mobility; (■) Directorate-General for Civil Aviation; (■) Directorate-General for the Merchant Marine; (■) Directorate-General for Land Transport; (■) General Secretariat for Urban Agenda and Housing (until 6 Apr 2023) / General Secretariat for Urban Agenda, Housing and Architecture (from 6 Apr 2023); (■) Directorate-General for Urban Agenda and Architecture; (■) Directorate-General for Housing and Soil; (■) Undersecretariat of Transport, Mobility and Urban Agenda; (■) Technical General Secretariat; (■) Directorate-General for Economic Programming and Budgets; (■) Directorate-General for Organization and Inspection; (■) Directorate-General for the National Geographic Institute; (■) Special Commissioner for Transport, Mobility and Urban Agenda (est. 5 May 2022)					
=== Ministry of Education and Vocational Training ===
Ministry of Education and Vocational Training (Ministerio de Educación y Formación Profesional)		Isabel Celaá	13 January 2020	12 July 2021	PSOE	
Ministry of Education and Vocational Training (Ministerio de Educación y Formación Profesional)		Pilar Alegría	12 July 2021	21 November 2023	PSOE	
Ministry of Education and Vocational Training (Ministerio de Educación y Formación Profesional)	29 January 2020 – 6 December 2023: (■) State Secretariat for Education; (■) Directorate-General for Evaluation and Territorial Cooperation; (■) Directorate-General for Educational Planning and Management; (■) General Secretariat for Vocational Training; (■) Undersecretariat of Education and Vocational Training; (■) Technical General Secretariat					
=== Ministry of Labour and Social Economy ===
Ministry of Labour and Social Economy (Ministerio de Trabajo y Economía Social)		Yolanda Díaz	13 January 2020	21 November 2023	Unidas Podemos/Sumar (PCE)	
Ministry of Labour and Social Economy (Ministerio de Trabajo y Economía Social)	29 January 2020 – 6 December 2023: (■) State Secretariat for Employment and Social Economy; (■) Special Commissioner for Social Economy (est. 29 Sep 2022); (■) Directorate-General for Labour; (■) Directorate-General for Self-Employment, the Social Economy and Corporate Social Responsibility; (■) Undersecretariat of Labour and Social Economy; (■) Technical General Secretariat					
=== Ministry of Industry, Trade and Tourism ===
Ministry of Industry, Trade and Tourism (Ministerio de Industria, Comercio y Turismo)		Reyes Maroto	13 January 2020	28 March 2023	PSOE	
Ministry of Industry, Trade and Tourism (Ministerio de Industria, Comercio y Turismo)		Héctor Gómez	28 March 2023	21 November 2023	PSOE	
Ministry of Industry, Trade and Tourism (Ministerio de Industria, Comercio y Turismo)	29 January 2020 – 6 December 2023: (■) State Secretariat for Trade; (■) Directorate-General for International Trade and Investments; (■) Directorate-General for Trade Policy and Competitiveness (disest. 11 Jan 2023); (■) Directorate-General for Trade Policy (est. 11 Jan 2023); (■) State Secretariat for Tourism; (■) General Secretariat for Industry and Small and Medium-sized Enterprises; (■) Directorate-General for Industry and Small and Medium-sized Enterprises; (■) Undersecretariat of Industry, Trade and Tourism; (■) Technical General Secretariat; (■) Special Commissioner for the Agri-food SPERT (est. 11 Jan 2023); (■) Special Commissioner for the Industrial Decarbonization SPERT (est. 11 Jan 2023); (■) Special Commissioner for the Development of an Ecosystem for the Manufacture of the Electric and Connected Vehicle SPERT (est. 18 Jan 2023)					
=== Ministry of Agriculture, Fisheries and Food ===
Ministry of Agriculture, Fisheries and Food (Ministerio de Agricultura, Pesca y Alimentación)		Luis Planas	13 January 2020	21 November 2023	PSOE	
Ministry of Agriculture, Fisheries and Food (Ministerio de Agricultura, Pesca y Alimentación)	29 January 2020 – 6 December 2023: (■) General Secretariat for Agriculture and Food; (■) Directorate-General for Agricultural Production and Markets; (■) Directorate-General for Health of Agricultural Production; (■) Directorate General for Rural Development, Innovation and Agrifood Training; (■) Directorate-General for the Food Industry; (■) General Secretariat for Fisheries; (■) Directorate-General for Fishery Resources (disest. 6 Mar 2020); (■) Directorate-General for Sustainable Fisheries (est. 6 Mar 2020); (■) Directorate-General for Fisheries Management and Aquaculture; (■) Undersecretariat of Agriculture, Fisheries and Food; (■) Technical General Secretariat; (■) Directorate-General for Services (disest. 6 Mar 2020); (■) Directorate-General for Services and Inspection (est. 6 Mar 2020)					
=== Ministry of the Presidency, Relations with the Cortes and Democratic Memory ===
Ministry of the Presidency, Relations with the Cortes and Democratic Memory (Ministerio de la Presidencia, Relaciones con las Cortes y Memoria Democrática)		Carmen Calvo	13 January 2020	12 July 2021	PSOE	
Ministry of the Presidency, Relations with the Cortes and Democratic Memory (Ministerio de la Presidencia, Relaciones con las Cortes y Memoria Democrática)		Félix Bolaños	12 July 2021	21 November 2023	PSOE	
Ministry of the Presidency, Relations with the Cortes and Democratic Memory (Ministerio de la Presidencia, Relaciones con las Cortes y Memoria Democrática)	29 January 2020 – 6 December 2023: (■) State Secretariat for Relations with the Cortes and Constitutional Affairs; (■) Directorate-General for Relations with the Cortes; (■) Directorate-General for Constitutional Affairs and Legal Coordination; (■) State Secretariat for Democratic Memory; (■) Directorate-General for Democratic Memory; (■) Undersecretariat of the Presidency, Relations with the Cortes and Democratic Memory; (■) Technical General Secretariat–Government Secretariat; (■) Directorate-General for Services (est. 16 Feb 2022); (■) Special Commissioner for the Reconstruction of the island of La Palma (est. 8 Jun 2022)					
=== Ministry of Territorial Policy ===
Ministry of Territorial Policy and Civil Service (Ministerio de Política Territorial y Función Pública) (until 12 July 2021) Ministry of Territorial Policy (Ministerio de Política Territorial) (from 12 July 2021)		Carolina Darias	13 January 2020	27 January 2021	PSOE	
Ministry of Territorial Policy and Civil Service (Ministerio de Política Territorial y Función Pública) (until 12 July 2021) Ministry of Territorial Policy (Ministerio de Política Territorial) (from 12 July 2021)		Miquel Iceta	27 January 2021	12 July 2021	PSOE (PSC–PSOE)	
Ministry of Territorial Policy and Civil Service (Ministerio de Política Territorial y Función Pública) (until 12 July 2021) Ministry of Territorial Policy (Ministerio de Política Territorial) (from 12 July 2021)		Isabel Rodríguez	12 July 2021	21 November 2023	PSOE	
Ministry of Territorial Policy and Civil Service (Ministerio de Política Territorial y Función Pública) (until 12 July 2021) Ministry of Territorial Policy (Ministerio de Política Territorial) (from 12 July 2021)	29 January 2020 – 12 July 2021: (■) State Secretariat for Territorial Policy and Civil Service; (■) General Secretariat for Territorial Coordination; (■) Directorate-General for Regional and Local Cooperation; (■) Directorate-General for Regional and Local Legal Regime; (■) Directorate-General of the General State Administration in the Territory; (■) General Secretariat for the Civil Service; (■) Directorate-General for the Civil Service; (■) Directorate-General for Public Governance; (■) Office for Conflicts of Interest; (■) Undersecretariat of Territorial Policy and Civil Service; (■) Technical General Secretariat; 12 July 2021 – 6 December 2023: (■) State Secretariat for Territorial Policy; (■) General Secretariat for Territorial Coordination; (■) Directorate-General for Regional and Local Cooperation; (■) Directorate-General for Regional and Local Legal Regime; (■) Directorate-General of the General State Administration in the Territory; (■) Undersecretariat of Territorial Policy; (■) Technical General Secretariat					
=== Ministry for the Ecological Transition and the Demographic Challenge ===
Ministry for the Ecological; Transition and the Demographic; Challenge (Ministerio para la Transición; Ecológica y el Reto Demográfico)		Teresa Ribera	13 January 2020	21 November 2023	PSOE	
Ministry for the Ecological; Transition and the Demographic; Challenge (Ministerio para la Transición; Ecológica y el Reto Demográfico)	29 January 2020 – 6 December 2023: (■) State Secretariat for Energy; (■) Commissioner for the Promotion of Sustainable Energy in Island Systems (est. 7 Jul 2022); (■) Directorate-General for Energy Policy and Mines; (■) State Secretariat for Environment; (■) Directorate-General for Water; (■) Spanish Office for Climate Change; (■) Directorate-General for Environmental Quality and Evaluation; (■) Directorate-General for the Coast and the Sea; (■) Directorate-General for Biodiversity, Forests and Desertification; (■) General Secretariat for the Demographic Challenge; (■) Directorate-General for Policies against Depopulation; (■) Undersecretariat for the Ecological Transition and the Demographic Challenge; (■) Technical General Secretariat; (■) Directorate-General for Services					
=== Ministry of Culture and Sports ===
Ministry of Culture and Sports (Ministerio de Cultura y Deporte)		José Manuel Rodríguez Uribes	13 January 2020	12 July 2021	PSOE	
Ministry of Culture and Sports (Ministerio de Cultura y Deporte)		Miquel Iceta	12 July 2021	21 November 2023	PSOE (PSC–PSOE)	
Ministry of Culture and Sports (Ministerio de Cultura y Deporte)	29 January 2020 – 6 December 2023: (■) General Secretariat of Culture (until 4 Aug 2021) / General Secretariat of Culture and Sports (from 4 Aug 2021); (■) Directorate-General for Books and Promotion of Reading (disest. 26 Apr 2023); (■) Directorate-General for Books, Comics and Reading (est. 26 Apr 2023); (■) Directorate-General for Cultural Industries, Intellectual Property and Cooperation; (■) Directorate-General for Fine Arts (disest. 16 Feb 2022); (■) Directorate-General for Cultural Heritage and Fine Arts (est. 16 Feb 2022); (■) Undersecretariat of Culture and Sports; (■) Technical General Secretariat; (●) High Council for Sports; (■) President's Office of the High Council for Sports; (■) Directorate-General for Sports					
=== Ministry of Economic Affairs and Digital Transformation ===
Ministry of Economic Affairs and Digital Transformation (Ministerio de Asuntos Económicos y Transformación Digital)		Nadia Calviño	13 January 2020	21 November 2023	PSOE (Independent)	
Ministry of Economic Affairs and Digital Transformation (Ministerio de Asuntos Económicos y Transformación Digital)	29 January 2020 – 6 December 2023: (■) State Secretariat for Economy and Enterprise Support; (■) General Secretariat for the Treasury and International Financing; (■) Directorate-General for the Treasury and Financial Policy; (■) Directorate-General for Economic Policy; (■) Directorate-General for Macroeconomic Analysis; (■) Directorate-General for Insurance and Pension Funds; (■) State Secretariat for Digitalization and Artificial Intelligence; (■) General Secretariat for Digital Administration; (■) Directorate-General for Digitalization and Artificial Intelligence (est. 10 Mar 2021); (■) State Secretariat for Telecommunications and Digital Infrastructure; (■) General Secretariat for Telecommunications and Management of the Audiovisual Communication Services (est. 5 Oct 2022); (■) Directorate-General for Telecommunications and Management of the Audiovisual Communication Services (disest. 5 Oct 2022); (■) Special Commissioner for the Alliance for the New Economy of Language (est. 2 Mar 2022); (■) Undersecretariat of Economic Affairs and Digital Transformation; (■) Technical General Secretariat					
=== Ministry of Health ===
Ministry of Health (Ministerio de Sanidad)		Salvador Illa	13 January 2020	27 January 2021	PSOE (PSC–PSOE)	
Ministry of Health (Ministerio de Sanidad)		Carolina Darias	27 January 2021	28 March 2023	PSOE	
Ministry of Health (Ministerio de Sanidad)		José Miñones	28 March 2023	21 November 2023	PSOE	
Ministry of Health (Ministerio de Sanidad)	29 January – 5 August 2020: (■) General Secretariat for Health; (■) Directorate-General for Public Health, Quality and Innovation; (■) Directorate-General for the Basic Catalogue of Services of the National Health System and Pharmacy (disest. 12 Mar 2020); (■) Directorate-General for the Common Catalogue of Services of the National Health System and Pharmacy (est. 12 Mar 2020); (■) Directorate-General for Professional Management; (■) Government Delegation for the National Plan on Drugs; (■) Undersecretariat of Health; (■) Technical General Secretariat; 5 August 2020 – 7 October 2021: (■) State Secretariat for Health; (■) Directorate-General for Public Health; (■) Directorate-General for the Common Catalogue of Services of the National Health System and Pharmacy; (■) Directorate-General for Professional Management; (■) Government Delegation for the National Plan on Drugs; (■) General Secretariat for Digital Health, Information and Innovation of the National Health System; (■) Directorate-General for Digital Health and Information Systems for the National Health System; (■) Undersecretariat of Health; (■) Technical General Secretariat; 7 October 2021 – 6 December 2023: (■) State Secretariat for Health; (■) General Secretariat for Digital Health, Information and Innovation of the National Health System; (■) Directorate-General for Digital Health and Information Systems for the National Health System; (■) Directorate-General for Public Health; (■) Directorate-General for the Common Catalogue of Services of the National Health System and Pharmacy; (■) Directorate-General for Professional Management; (■) Government Delegation for the National Plan on Drugs; (■) Undersecretariat of Health; (■) Technical General Secretariat					
=== Ministry of Social Rights and 2030 Agenda ===
Ministry of Social Rights and 2030 Agenda (Ministerio de Derechos Sociales y Agenda 2030)		Pablo Iglesias	13 January 2020	31 March 2021	Unidas Podemos (Podemos)	
Ministry of Social Rights and 2030 Agenda (Ministerio de Derechos Sociales y Agenda 2030)		Ione Belarra	31 March 2021	21 November 2023	Unidas Podemos/Sumar (Podemos)	
Ministry of Social Rights and 2030 Agenda (Ministerio de Derechos Sociales y Agenda 2030)	29 January 2020 – 6 December 2023: (■) State Secretariat for Social Rights; (■) Directorate-General for Children and Adolescent Rights; (■) Directorate-General for Family Diversity and Social Services; (■) Directorate-General for Disability Policies (disest. 5 May 2021); (■) Directorate-General for the Rights of Persons with Disabilities (est. 5 May 2021); (■) State Secretariat for the 2030 Agenda; (■) Directorate-General of Leverage Policies for Compliance with the 2030 Agenda; (■) Undersecretariat of Social Rights and 2030 Agenda; (■) Technical General Secretariat; (■) Directorate-General for Animal Rights					
=== Ministry of Science and Innovation ===
Ministry of Science and Innovation (Ministerio de Ciencia e Innovación)		Pedro Duque	13 January 2020	12 July 2021	PSOE (Independent)	
Ministry of Science and Innovation (Ministerio de Ciencia e Innovación)		Diana Morant	12 July 2021	21 November 2023	PSOE	
Ministry of Science and Innovation (Ministerio de Ciencia e Innovación)	29 January 2020 – 6 December 2023: (■) General Secretariat for Research; (■) Directorate-General for Research Planning; (■) General Secretariat for Innovation; (■) Undersecretariat of Science and Innovation; (■) Technical General Secretariat; (■) Commissioner for the Aerospace SPERT (est. 15 Jun 2022)					
=== Ministry of Equality ===
Ministry of Equality (Ministerio de Igualdad)		Irene Montero	13 January 2020	21 November 2023	Unidas Podemos/Sumar (Podemos)	
Ministry of Equality (Ministerio de Igualdad)	29 January 2020 – 6 December 2023: (■) State Secretariat for Equality and against Gender Violence; (■) Government Delegation against Gender Violence; (■) Directorate-General for Equal Treatment and Racial and Ethnic Diversity; (■) Directorate-General for Sexual Diversity and LGTBI Rights; (■) Undersecretariat of Equality; (■) Technical General Secretariat					
=== Ministry of Consumer Affairs ===
Ministry of Consumer Affairs (Ministerio de Consumo)		Alberto Garzón	13 January 2020	21 November 2023	Unidas Podemos/Sumar (IU, PCE)	
Ministry of Consumer Affairs (Ministerio de Consumo)	29 January 2020 – 6 December 2023: (■) General Secretariat for Consumer Affairs and Gambling; (■) Directorate-General for Consumer Affairs; (■) Directorate-General for Gambling Management; (■) Undersecretariat of Consumer Affairs; (■) Technical General Secretariat					
=== Ministry of Inclusion, Social Security and Migration ===
Ministry of Inclusion, Social Security and Migration (Ministerio de Inclusión, Seguridad Social y Migraciones)		José Luis Escrivá	13 January 2020	21 November 2023	PSOE (Independent)	
Ministry of Inclusion, Social Security and Migration (Ministerio de Inclusión, Seguridad Social y Migraciones)	29 January 2020 – 30 March 2022: (■) State Secretariat for Social Security and Pensions; (■) Directorate-General for Social Security Management; (■) Office of the Comptroller General of the Social Security; (■) State Secretariat for Migration; (■) Directorate-General for Migration; (■) Directorate-General for Inclusion and Humanitarian Attention (disest. 22 Apr 2021); (■) Directorate-General for International Protection Programs and Humanitarian Attention (est. 22 Apr 2021); (■) General Secretariat for Objectives and Policies of Social Inclusion and Forecast; (■) Undersecretariat of Inclusion, Social Security and Migration; (■) Technical General Secretariat; 30 March 2022 – 6 December 2023: (■) State Secretariat for Social Security and Pensions; (■) Directorate-General for Social Security Management; (■) Office of the Comptroller General of the Social Security; (■) State Secretariat for Migration; (■) Directorate-General for Migration; (■) Directorate-General for Humanitarian Attention and Social Inclusion of Immigration; (■) Directorate-General for Management of the International and Temporary Protection Reception System; (■) General Secretariat for Objectives and Policies of Social Inclusion and Forecast; (■) Undersecretariat of Inclusion, Social Security and Migration; (■) Technical General Secretariat					
=== Ministry of Universities ===
Ministry of Universities (Ministerio de Universidades)		Manuel Castells	13 January 2020	20 December 2021	Unidas Podemos (Indep., CatComú nominated)	
Ministry of Universities (Ministerio de Universidades)		Joan Subirats	20 December 2021	21 November 2023	Unidas Podemos/Sumar (CatComú)	
Ministry of Universities (Ministerio de Universidades)	29 January 2020 – 6 December 2023: (■) General Secretariat for Universities; (■) Undersecretariat of Universities; (■) Technical General Secretariat					
=== Spokesperson of the Government ===
Spokesperson of the Government (Portavoz del Gobierno)		María Jesús Montero	13 January 2020	12 July 2021	PSOE	
Spokesperson of the Government (Portavoz del Gobierno)		Isabel Rodríguez	12 July 2021	21 November 2023	PSOE	

== Notes ==
Preceded by Sánchez I	Government of Spain; 2020–2023	Succeeded by Sánchez III
