= Ministry of Inclusion, Social Security and Migration =

Government ministry of Spain

- Ministerio de Inclusión, Seguridad Social y Migraciones

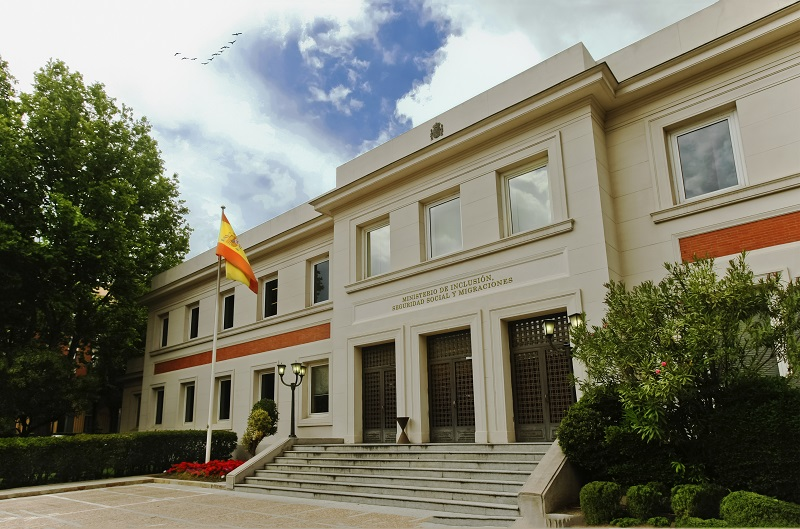
- Ministry HQ in Madrid

Agency overview
- Formed: January 12, 2020; 6 years ago
- Preceding agency: Ministry of Labour, Migration and Social Security (Social Security, migration)
- Type: Ministry
- Jurisdiction: Government of Spain
- Annual budget: € 886.6 million, 2026 (Ministry) € 204 billion, 2026 (Social Security Administration)
- Minister responsible: Elma Saiz, Minister
- Website: www.inclusion.gob.es

The Ministry of Inclusion, Social Security and Migration is a department of the government of Spain responsible for planning and carrying out the government policy on Social Security, foreigners, immigration and emigration.

The Ministry's purpose is to guarantee a sufficient and sustainable pension system, to establish new inclusive policies that reduce inequality, uncertainty and social exclusion and to develop a new legal framework to order and give security for migrants. The major policy planned by the ministry is to establish and manage a 'vital minimum income'.

The department was created by Prime Minister Pedro Sánchez as part of the Sánchez II Government and it took on some of the responsibilities of the Ministry of Labour, Migrations and Social Security; as well as the responsibilities of the Ministry of Finance in civil servants' pensions. It is overseen by the Minister of Inclusion, Social Security and Migration, currently Elma Saiz, who was appointed on 21 November 2023.

== Structure ==
Organizational chart of the Spanish Ministry of Social Security, May 2024

This Ministry is structured in the following higher bodies:

- The Secretariat of State for Social Security and Pensions
  - The Directorate-General for Social Security Management
  - The Office of the Comptroller General of the Social Security
- The Secretariat of State for Migration
  - The Directorate-General for Migration Management
  - The Directorate-General for Humanitarian Assistance and the Reception and International Protection System
  - The Directorate-General for Spanish Citizens Abroad and Return Policies
  - The Deputy Directorate-General for Legal Framework
- The General Secretariat for Inclusion
  - The Deputy Directorate-General for Inclusion Objectives and Indicators
  - The Deputy Directorate-General for Inclusion Policies
- The Undersecretariat
  - The Technical General Secretariat
  - The Deputy Directorate-General for Economic Management and Budget Office
  - The Deputy Directorate-General for Human Resources
  - The Deputy Directorate-General for General Affairs and Coordination
  - The Deputy Directorate-General for Information and Communications Technologies
  - The Deputy Directorate-General for Citizens Services and Inspection of Services

=== Agencies ===
- The National Institute of Social Security
- The Social Institute of Sea Workers
- The Social Security General Treasury
- The Social Security IT Department
- The Legal Service of the Social Security Administration
- The Permanent Observatory on Immigration

== Budget ==
In millions of euros (€)
1. Social Security 204,006 (99.6%)
2. Migration policy 816.8 (0.40%)
3. Administration and general services 67.1 (0.03%)
4. Other benefits 10.8 (0.01%)
5. Social inclusion 2.8 (0.00%)

For fiscal year 2023, extended to 2026, the Ministry of Inclusion, Social Security and Migration has a consolidated budget of €204.9 billion. Of this amount, €886.6 million are directly managed by the ministry's central services while €204 billion are managed by the Social Security agencies.

The budget can be divided into five main areas:

1. Social Security Administration (Section 60), which funds the Social Security Administration.
2. Other social benefits (Programs 212A, 219N, 231G), which covers some other social protection benefits.
3. Migration policy (231B & 231H), which finances the government migration policy.
4. Social inclusion (232E), aimed at designing social inclusion policies.
5. Administration and general services (291M), covering the Ministry’s central services and administrative structure.

In addition, Programme 000X (“Internal Transfers and Disbursements”) is excluded from the analysis, as it consists of transfers between public sector entities and would otherwise lead to double counting and distort the overall budget.

=== Audit ===
Unlike other ministerial departments, the accounts of the Ministry of Inclusion, Social Security and Migration, and its agencies, are audited internally by two bodies.

Firstly, matters relating to the Ministry itself are audited directly by the Office of the Comptroller General of the State (IGAE), through a Delegated Comptroller's Office within the Department itself. Secondly, the managing entities and common services of the Social Security system are audited by the Office of the Comptroller General of the Social Security (IGSS), although it is functionally dependent on the IGAE. Externally, the Court of Auditors is responsible for auditing expenditures.

Likewise, the Congress of Deputies Committee on Labour, Social Economy, Inclusion, Social Security and Migration, and the Senate Committee on Inclusion, Social Security and Migration, exercise political control over the accounts.

== List of officeholders ==
Office name:

- Ministry of Inclusion, Social Security and Migration (2020–present)

Portrait	Name (Birth–Death)	Term of office			Party	Government	Prime Minister (Tenure)	Ref.
Portrait	Name (Birth–Death)	Took office	Left office	Duration	Party	Government	Prime Minister (Tenure)	Ref.
	José Luis Escrivá (born 1960)	13 January 2020	21 November 2023	3 years and 312 days	Independent	Sánchez II	Pedro Sánchez (2018–present)	
	Elma Saiz (born 1975)	21 November 2023	Incumbent	2 years and 263 days	PSOE	Sánchez III	Pedro Sánchez (2018–present)	
