= Secretary of State for Social Security (Spain) =

Government minister

Secretary of State for Social Security and Pensions
- Coat of Arms used by the Government

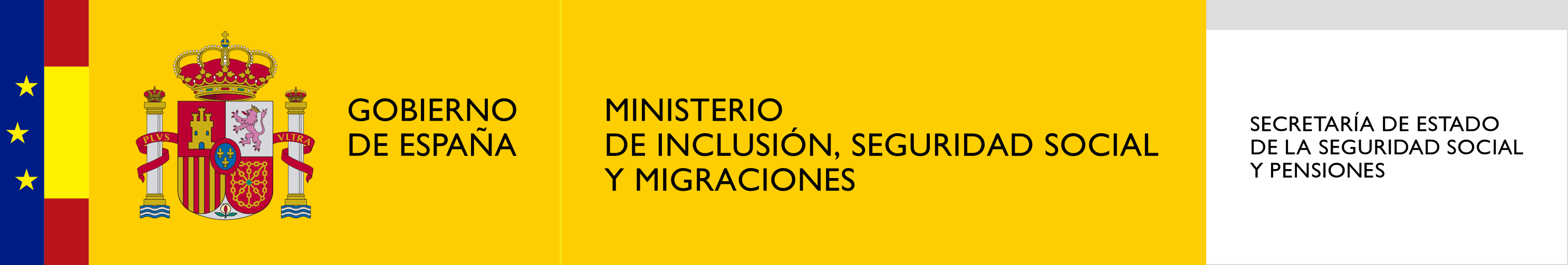

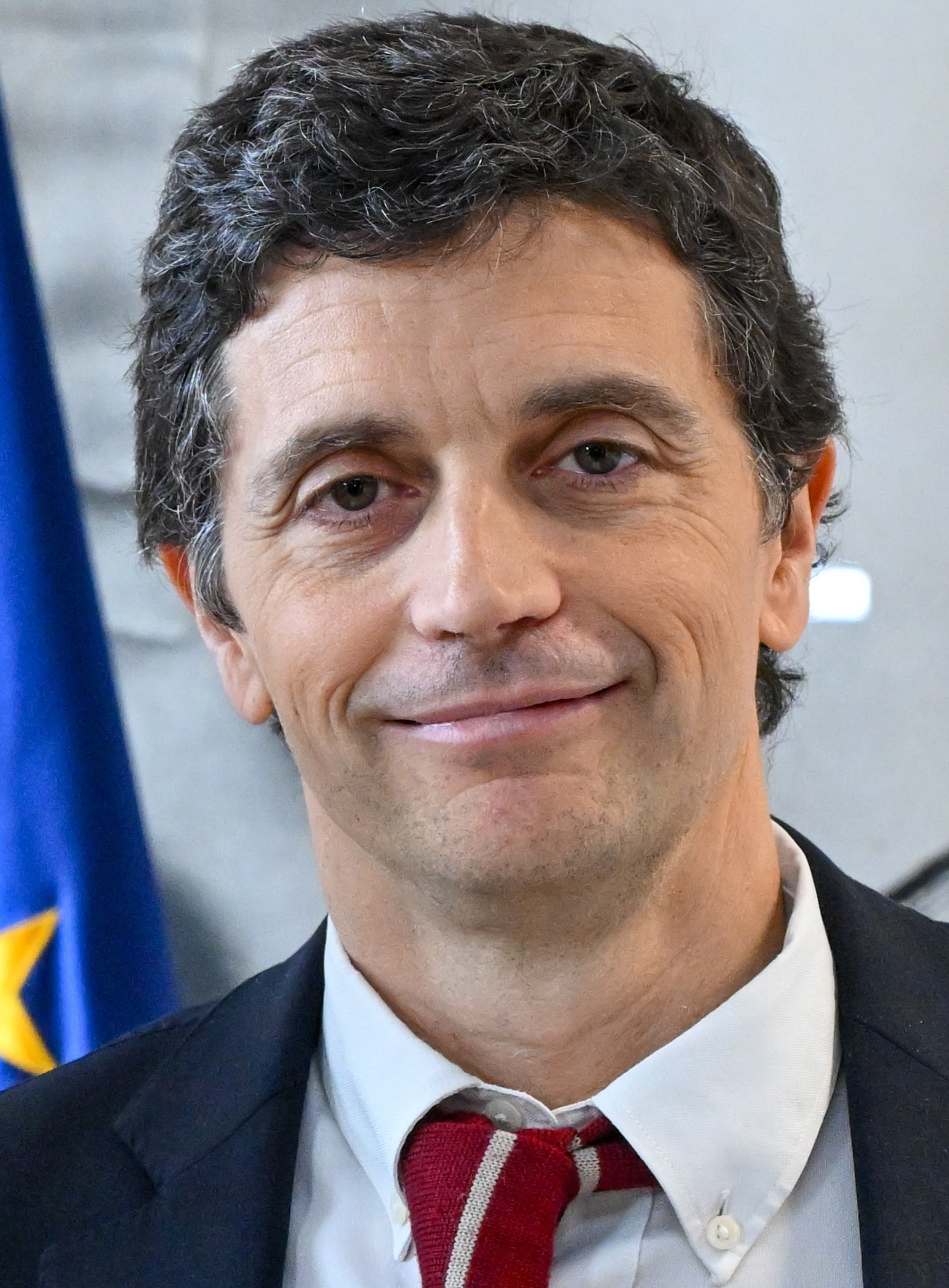
- Incumbent; Francisco de Borja Suárez Corujo since 28 June 2022
- Ministry of Inclusion, Social Security and Migration
- Style: The Most Excellent (formal); Mr. Secretary of State (informal)
- Reports to: The Social Security Minister
- Appointer: The Monarch
- Precursor: Director-General for Social Security
- Formation: 6 February 1976; 50 years ago
- First holder: Juan Rovira Tarazona
- Website: inclusion.gob.es

The secretary of state for Social Security and pensions, previously known as under-secretary for Social Security, is a senior minister of the Spanish Ministry of Inclusion, Social Security and Migration responsible for supervising the Social Security Administration.

In this capacity, the secretary of state assists the social security minister in the design and implementation of the social security policy, as well as oversees the proper functioning of the agencies and collaborating entities that make up the Social Security Administration. Additionally, the secretary of state supports the Social Security's Data Protection Officer (Spanish: Delegado de Protección de Datos, DPD)—an independent official of the Spanish Data Protection Agency—in ensuring the protection of citizens' personal data.

Since 28 June 2022, Francisco de Borja Suárez Corujo, former Director-General for Social Security Management, has served as secretary of state.

== History ==
The position of Secretary of State for Social Security was established by labour minister José Solís Ruiz in February 1976 as Under-Secretary for Social Security to replace in their responsibilities to the Director-General for Social Security—that existed since the 1920s—and the Ministry's Under-Secretary, who acted as coordinator for the Social Security affairs. According to its constituent rule, the position was established due to the "complexity" of the Social Security System, "both at the organic and functional level".

In this sense, minister Solís stated that "it is essential to put an end to the dispersion of powers in different Management Centres which, logically, must coordinate their respective spheres of action to the maximum, an objective that is very difficult to achieve without first carrying out, in the administrative order, the corresponding integrating action, only achievable through the institution of a higher instance which, with right sense and unity of criteria, must undoubtedly contribute to the improvement and effectiveness of the System itself".

The reorganization was not limited to creating this position, but also established new bodies with the rank of director-general and deputy director-general to assist the new undersecretary.

The 1977 Cabinet reshuffle meant that Social Security was transferred to the Ministry of Health and, in July 30, 1977, the position was abolished and its functions were transferred to the Ministry's Under-Secretary. The following year, a few months before the approval of the Constitution, the position was re-established with the rank of secretary of state. It did not last long, as it was abolished in April 1979 to make way for a new Secretariat of State for Health; its functions were once again assumed by the Department's Under-Secretary until the office was re-established in September 1980, when José Barea Tejeiro was appointed as both Secretary of State for Social Security and Under-Secretary of the Ministry of Health.

Main headquarters of the National Institute of the Social Security in Madrid

Main headquarters of the Social Security's General Treasury in Madrid

To this top body were attached the Social Security's agencies and was structured through three governing bodies: the Directorate-General for the Legal Regime of Social Security, the Directorate-General for the Economic Regime of Social Security and the Deputy Directorate-General for Coordination. In 1981, all the economic, budgetary, inspection and management control responsibilities of all the Social Security agencies were transferred to it through the incorporation into its structure of the Office of the Comptroller General of the Social Security.

The temporary merger of the Labour and Health ministries in 1981 gave rise to the Ministry of Labour, Health and Social Security, returning the powers over Social Security to the Ministry of Labour and confirming this intention at the end of this year when they were once again separated and the Labour Ministry acquired the name of "Labour and Social Security". As a result, the secretariat of state was degraded to the rank of undersecretariat once again, first as Under-Secretary for Social Security (1981–1982) and then as Secretary-General for Social Security (1982–1996).

The new conservative government of 1996 restored the Secretariat of State's status to the position, although removing the prominence that it had in the denomination of the ministry, that was called Ministry of Labour and Social Affairs. It was at this time that the current structure was adopted with the creation of the Directorate-General for Social Security Management (Spanish: Dirección General de Ordenación de la Seguridad Social, DGOSS). The Legal Service of the Social Security Administration was created on May 12, 2000 and the Social Security Information Technology Department has been under the responsibility of the secretary of state since 2004.

In January 2020 a major shift happened when an exclusive department for the Social Security was created, the Ministry of Inclusion, Social Security and Migration. This department assumed all the powers and bodies of the Ministry of Labour relating social security and migration affairs. This position was renamed as "Secretary of State for Social Security and Pensions".

== Structure ==
The Secretariat of State is integrated by three main departments and a personal Cabinet to the secretary of state:

- The Directorate-General for Social Security Management.

It is responsible for, among other things, carrying out the legal, economic and financial organisation of the Social Security, planning and drafting of economic-financial and demographic studies, drawing up preliminary draft Social Security budgets, economic and budgetary oversight of the Managing Agencies and Common Services, and the knowledge and evaluation of the management and economic-financial situation of the Mutual Societies for Work-Related Injuries and Occupational Diseases.

- The Office of the Comptroller General of the Social Security.

It carries out the internal control of Social Security. It is directly responsible to the Office of the General Comptroller of the State Administration.

- The Legal Service of the Social Security Administration.

It exercises the Social Security's powers related to the legal representation and defense of the Social Security agencies.

- The Cabinet, which provides political, parliamentary and institutional support to the secretary of state.

The secretary of state also oversees the following Social Security agencies:

- The National Institute of the Social Security.
- The Social Institute of Sea Workers.
- The General Treasury of the Social Security .
- The Social Security IT Department.

== List of state secretaries ==
For the purpose of this list, the date used is the date on which the decree of appointment or dismissal received royal assent, which may differ from the date of publication or of the effective taking of office.

Denotes an Acting Secretary of State.

Name	Term			Government		Ref.
Name	Start	End	Duration	Prime Minister	Monarch	Ref.
Juan Rovira Tarazona (1930–1990)	6 February 1976	10 August 1976	186 days	The Marquess of Arias Navarro (1976–1981)	Juan Carlos I (1975–2014)	
Victorino Anguera Sansó (1933–2010)	10 August 1976	30 July 1977	354 days	The Duke of Suárez (1976–1981)	Juan Carlos I (1975–2014)	
Office disestablished during this interval.				The Duke of Suárez (1976–1981)	Juan Carlos I (1975–2014)	
Luis Gámir (1942–2017)	14 October 1978	6 January 1979	84 days	The Duke of Suárez (1976–1981)	Juan Carlos I (1975–2014)	
Office disestablished during this interval.				The Duke of Suárez (1976–1981)	Juan Carlos I (1975–2014)	
José Barea Tejeiro (1923–2014)	26 September 1980	20 June 1981	267 days	The Duke of Suárez (1976–1981)	Juan Carlos I (1975–2014)	
José Barea Tejeiro (1923–2014)	26 September 1980	20 June 1981	267 days	The Marquess of Ría de Ribadeo (1981–1982)	Juan Carlos I (1975–2014)	
José Antonio Sánchez Velayos (1941–2016)	20 June 1981	7 December 1982	1 year, 170 days	The Marquess of Ría de Ribadeo (1981–1982)	Juan Carlos I (1975–2014)	
Luis García de Blas	7 December 1982	29 August 1986	3 years, 265 days	Felipe González (1982–1996)	Juan Carlos I (1975–2014)	
Adolfo Jiménez Fernández	29 August 1986	10 May 1996	9 years, 255 days	Felipe González (1982–1996)	Juan Carlos I (1975–2014)	
Juan Carlos Aparicio (born 1955)	10 May 1996	26 February 2000	3 years, 292 days	José María Aznar (1996–2004)	Juan Carlos I (1975–2014)	
Marino Díaz Guerra (1937–2020)	29 February 2000	5 May 2000	66 days	José María Aznar (1996–2004)	Juan Carlos I (1975–2014)	
Gerardo Camps (born 1963)	5 May 2000	27 June 2003	3 years, 53 days	José María Aznar (1996–2004)	Juan Carlos I (1975–2014)	
Fernando Castelló (born 1958)	27 June 2003	19 April 2004	297 days	José María Aznar (1996–2004)	Juan Carlos I (1975–2014)	
Octavio Granado (born 1959)	19 April 2004	30 December 2011	7 years, 255 days	José Luis Rodríguez Zapatero (2004–2011)	Juan Carlos I (1975–2014)	
Tomás Burgos Gallego (born 1962)	30 December 2011	18 June 2018	6 years, 170 days	Mariano Rajoy (2011–2018)	Juan Carlos I (1975–2014)	
Tomás Burgos Gallego (born 1962)	30 December 2011	18 June 2018	6 years, 170 days	Mariano Rajoy (2011–2018)	Felipe VI (2014–present)	
Octavio Granado (born 1959)	18 June 2018	14 January 2020	1 year, 210 days	Pedro Sánchez (2018–)	Felipe VI (2014–present)	
Israel Arroyo Martínez (born 1976)	14 January 2020	27 June 2022	2 years, 164 days	Pedro Sánchez (2018–)	Felipe VI (2014–present)	
Francisco de Borja Suárez Corujo (born 1973)	27 June 2022	Incumbent	4 years, 75 days	Pedro Sánchez (2018–)	Felipe VI (2014–present)	
