= Pensions in Spain =

Pensions in Spain consist of a mandatory state pension scheme, and voluntary company and individual pension provision.

== Mandatory state pension scheme ==
The state pension scheme is part of the Social Security system in Spain. There are two categories of pension in Spain: contributory and non-contributory. The pensions system is financed by a payroll tax on salaries. The employee pays 4.7% of their salary while employers must pay the equivalent of 23.6% of an employee's salary into the scheme.

=== Non-contributory pension ===
Non-contributory means-tested pensions are targeted at low-income households and the disabled. Beneficiaries must not have been contributory members of the Social Security system during their working life. In 2000, beneficiaries of non-contributory pensions was 471,275 pesetas.

In 2010 in order to qualify the beneficiary may not have a monthly or annual income equal to or greater than the non-contributory pension of €339.70 per month (€4,755 per annum). Incomes of any persons living with the applicant are taken into account when deciding eligibility. In 2012 the pension was raised to 357.70 euros a month. If the pension was claimed directly by the person then 2 additional months' pension are added throughout the year to make it a total of 14 months a year of pension. If the disabled person was claimed by a parent or guardian then there are only 12 months of pension a year. Both are the same amount each month, but the total for the entire year is much more if claimed by the disabled person compared with being claimed by the parent or guardian.

=== Contributory pension ===
The contributory retirement pension (Pension por Jubilacion Ordinaria) represents the main source of retirement income for approximately 8.75 million pensioners in Spain. In 2010 the average pension was 906 euros per month. Contributory retirement pensions in Spain are the second highest (as % of final salary) in Europe after Greece and amount to approximately 81% of final salary levels. While the social security system collected 80Bn€ in contributions in 2010 it paid out 82 Bn€ in pensions. In January 2011 the government, employers and trade unions agreed on a series of reforms that will increase the retirement age by 2 years from 65 to 67 years. The new minimum age will come into effect in 2027.

== Private pensions ==
Private pensions in Spain generally consist of individual pensions and collective pensions (divided into associative and company schemes). Approximately 50% of the population are covered by one or both types.

Introduced under the Law on Pension Plans and Funds in June 1987, private schemes had assets totaling 7% of GDP in 2010. The schemes benefit from tax subsidies whereby individuals can contribute up to €8,000 per year free of income tax into either collective or individual schemes. By 2009 approximately 8 million people had Individual Pension Plans and 2 million people were covered by company pension plans. The assets of Individual Funds amounted to about 53 Bn€ while Company Funds had assets of about 3 Bn €.

== Social Security Reserve Fund ==
The Social Security Reserve Fund was created in 2000 with the aim of investing current Social Security surpluses in order to finance future State Pension Scheme shortfalls. It was created as one of the recommendations of the tri-partite Toledo Pact of 1995 between government, employers and trade unions. In 2009 the fund amounted to 60 Bn€ and in 2010 assets had increased to 64 Bn€. By the end of 2018, there was just 5 Bn€ left.

== Reforms ==
The necessity of reforming Spain's pension system arose largely in response to pressure resulting from Spain's changing demographic trends. A growing and ageing population and a declining fertility rate are two sources of significant strain upon Spain's public budgets and finances, as the public pension system had to rely upon a smaller productive population to contribute enough taxes to compensate for a growing demographic of elderly retired workers who would be withdrawing from their pensions, living for longer periods of time, and would likely be in need of costly health services. This demographic trend is predicted to continue in the coming decades, with the World bank predicting that half of Spain's population will fall into an age demographic older than 55 by the year 2050, and if this prediction becomes a reality than Spain would have one of the highest median ages in the world. In addition to a growing elderly demographic of pensioners, Spain also has a high child gap (the difference between the highest number of children and the number that couples want), and trends suggest that the total fertility rate is in a decline. Spain's average birth rate was 2.86 in 1970, 2.21 in 1980, and 1.21 in 1994, and according to Eurostat, Spain's average birth rate was 1.18 in contrast with the European Community's average of 1.43. At this point in 1994, Spain is 44% below the minimum rate needed to achieve generation replacement. In light of these demographic trends challenging the sustainability of Spain pension system, reforms and austerity measures have sought to reduce the generosity of the state's pension benefits and create incentives and changes to keep older workers in the labor force for a longer period.

One of Spain's key reforms to implement this policy is to increase the retirement age from 65 to 67 over a number of years, but this change will occur gradually over a 14-year period that started in 2013 and will end in 2027. The retirement age will increase by a month and a half each year up to the end date, and is being conducted in a staggered manner to make the change less disruptive to the population. However, this new retirement age does have exceptions to make it more flexible—individuals who have the maximum years of contributions will be able to retire at the age of 64, and it will also be possible that in cases of involuntary unemployment that those who have 33 years of contributions will be able to enter into early retirement up to four years before the retirement age. Legal retirement age in the case of voluntary unemployment will require 35 years of contributions. Partial retirement is also a possibility, if a new employee is brought in and once the reform is completed in 2027, partial retirement will be possible at the age of 63 if 36 years have been contributed. In this case both the new and the partially retired employee will contribute fully to the pension system. Prior to the implementation of this reform, partially retired workers only contributed proportionally based on the amount of time they worked. Exceptions to the new retirement age will also include individuals who work in dangerous, hazardous, or unhealthy conditions, and individuals with assessed disabilities of 65% or more, and in cases of reduced life expectancy individuals will be able to retire at a lower age if they have a 45% or more assessed disability.

The reforms will also encourage workers to delay retirement and the withdrawal of pension benefits after retirement age by creating incentives for them to continue working. Workers that have contributed between 15 and 25 years and continue working after the age of 67 will be able to increase their pension benefits by 2% of the base calculation per additional year, and this increase will scale depending on the years of contribution. Up to 4% if worker have 37 years of contributions. Other significant reforms to the pension system will concern the minimum period the number of years that the pension system must be contributed before a public pension can be secured. The minimum originally being 15 years but like the retirement age the minimum will also rise in a staggered manner up to 25 years. Pension reforms will also address the needs of the family by covering maternity and paternity periods with up to three years of leave of absence for childcare, and in the case of maternity, a supplement will apply to contributory pensions for retirement, widowhood, and permanent disability as of 2016. This additional percentage of contributory pension will increase to up to 15% depending on the number of children; this is one incentive to address the issue of Spain's current fertility rate, and how Spanish women tend to have their first child relatively late in life compared with other European countries. An additional reform will also come into effect in 2019, when calculations based on life expectancy, the number of pensioners, and the financial situation of the pension system will replace the previous inflation-based system. To see that these measures continue to be implemented, a committee will be appointed to report on the sustainability of the pension system in a periodic manner.

== See also ==
- Pan-European Pension
