= Office of the Comptroller General of the Social Security =

- Logo of the Social Security

Agency overview
- Formed: December 28, 1977; 48 years ago
- Headquarters: 5 Valenzuela Street Madrid
- Employees: 55 (2025)
- Annual budget: € 91 million (2025)
- Agency executive: Sonia Pérez-Urría Ventosa, Comptroller General
- Parent department: Ministry of Inclusion, Social Security and Migration
- Parent agency: Secretariat of State for Social Security and Pensions; Office of the Comptroller General of the State Administration
- Website: seg-social.es

The Office of the Comptroller General of the Social Security (Spanish: Intervención General de la Seguridad Social, IGSS) is a Spanish government agency responsible for the internal audit and accounting duties of all the entities that make up the Social Security Administration. Although integrated into the Ministry of Inclusion, Social Security and Migration, through the Secretary of State for Social Security and Pensions, the agency reports directly to the Comptroller General of the State Administration.

The IGSS was created in December 1977. The current comptroller general of the Social Security is Sonia Pérez-Urría Ventosa, who assumed office on December 10, 2020.

== Powers ==
The Office has powers related to:

- Internal control, through the exercise of the audit function and the financial control actions.
- The management of public accounting in the sphere of Social Security, without prejudice to the competences that are attributed in accounting matters to the IGAE.
- The accounting management of the Management Entities and Common Services of the Social Security.
- The advice to the management bodies derived from its control functions.
- The coordination of the comptroller delegations in the Managing Entities and Common Services of the Social Security, giving them the precise instructions for the development of their functions that it deems appropriate and resolving the queries that may be formulated by them.
- The participation with voice and vote in the collective bodies in which, in accordance with current regulations, it must assist.
- To advise in the preparation of the Social Security Budget.
- To send quarterly to the Budget Committees of the Congress of Deputies and the Senate the information on the execution of the budgets of the entities that make up the Social Security system.
- The exercise of any other functions and competences attributed to it by current regulations.

== Organization chart ==
The Office of the Comptroller General of the Social Security (IGSS) is structure through two large structures; one centralized and another decentralized.

=== Central services ===
The central structure of the IGSS is integrated by:

- The Deputy Directorate-General for Audit and Control.
- The Deputy Directorate-General for Management, Planning and Accounting Management.
- The Deputy Directorate-General for Financial Control.
- The Deputy Directorate-General for Organization, Planning and Resource Management.
- The Department for Audit Quality Control.

=== Decentralized services ===
The decentralized structure of the IGSS consists of:

- The comptroller delegations in the central services of the Managing Entities and Common Services (agencies) of the Social Security.
- The territorial comptroller delegations.
- The auditors and other representatives in the councils, boards, commissions and collective bodies in general, in which it is required.
- Other services of the department in the Social Security Administration.

Each comptroller delegation has an Accounting Office and a Financial Control Unit. Likewise, multiple Delegated Comptrollers may be attached to the aforementioned delegations, with the functions and competences established by the Comptroller General of the Social Security. These delegated auditors are appointed, at the proposal of the Comptroller General, among officials of the Higher Audit and Accounting Corps of the Social Security Administration.

== Comptroller general ==
The head of the Office is the Comptroller General of the Social Security. The Comptroller General is appointed by royal decree at the joint proposal of the Ministers of Social Security and of Finance and at the initiative of the Comptroller General of the State Administration. The Controller General of the Social Security is replaced in case of vacancy, absence or illness by the Deputy Director-General for Audit and Control of the Social Security System. Failing that, the substitution will fall to the oldest Deputy Director-General by appointment and, if equality occurs, in the oldest by age.

=== List of comptrollers general ===
1. Ignacio Montaño Jiménez (1978–1980)
2. Francisco Ripoll Prados (1980–1992)
3. Rafael Muñoz López-Carmona (1992–1994)
4. Julián Arcos Alcaraz (1994–1995)
5. Jaime Sánchez Revenga (1995–2000)
6. Antonio Fernández Huerta (2000–2006)
7. Maria Victoria Vigueras García (2006–2015)
8. Manuel Rodríguez Martínez (2015–2020)
9. Sonia Pérez-Urría Ventosa (2020–presente)
