= Fourth Deputy Prime Minister of Spain =

Senior position in the government of Spain

Fourth Deputy Prime Minister
- Vicepresidencia cuarta del Gobierno
- Coat of arms of Spain
- Incumbent; Office abolished
- Government of Spain; Council of Ministers
- Style: Excelentísimo/a Señor/a
- Member of: Cabinet
- Residence: Palacio de la Moncloa
- Seat: Madrid, Spain
- Nominator: Prime Minister
- Appointer: Monarch; Countersigned by the Prime Minister of Spain
- Term length: No fixed term No term limits are imposed on the office.
- Constituting instrument: Constitution of 1978
- Formation: 13 January 2020 (6 years ago)
- First holder: Teresa Ribera
- Final holder: María Jesús Montero
- Abolished: 12 July 2021; 29 December 2023

The fourth deputy prime minister of Spain, officially the fourth vice president of the Government (Spanish: Vicepresidente cuarto del Gobierno), was a senior member of the Government of Spain. The office of the fourth deputy prime minister is not a permanent position, existing only at the discretion of the prime minister.

== History and powers ==
It is an office of new creation established on 13 January 2020. Teresa Ribera, the minister for the Ecological Transition, was appointed the first officeholder.

The office of fourth deputy prime minister does not possess special constitutional powers beyond its responsibility as a member of the Council of Ministers. The position is regulated in the Government Act of 1997 and it only specifies that the raison d'être of the office is to replace the Prime Minister when the office is vacant, or the premier is absent or ill. The fourth deputy prime minister only assumes this responsibility if the first, second and third deputies could not do it.

The office was abolished on 12 July 2021, when Prime Minister Pedro Sánchez promoted Teresa Ribera to third deputy prime minister. It was re-established on 21 November 2023, when Prime Minister Pedro Sánchez appointed María Jesús Montero to the office. It was abolished again on 29 December 2023, when María Jesús Montero was promoted to first deputy prime minister.

== List of officeholders ==
Office name:

- Fourth Vice Presidency of the Government (2020–2021; 2023)

Portrait	Name (Birth–Death)	Term of office			Party	Government	Prime Minister (Tenure)	Ref.
Portrait	Name (Birth–Death)	Took office	Left office	Duration	Party	Government	Prime Minister (Tenure)	Ref.
	Teresa Ribera (born 1969)	13 January 2020	12 July 2021	1 year and 180 days	PSOE	Sánchez II	Pedro Sánchez (2018–present)	
Office disestablished during this interval.
	María Jesús Montero (born 1966)	21 November 2023	29 December 2023	38 days	PSOE	Sánchez III	Pedro Sánchez (2018–present)	

== See also ==
- Deputy Prime Minister of Spain
- Second Deputy Prime Minister of Spain
- Third Deputy Prime Minister of Spain
