= Secretary of State for Migration =

- Secretario de Estado de Migraciones
- Coat of Arms used by the Government

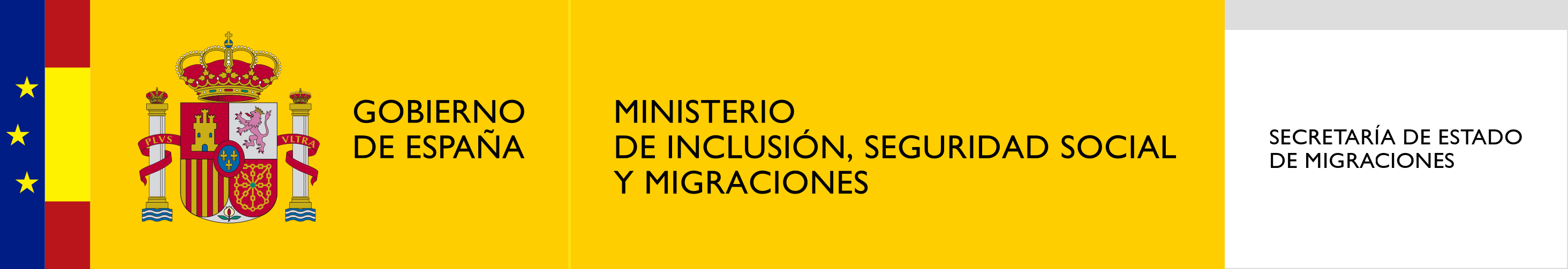

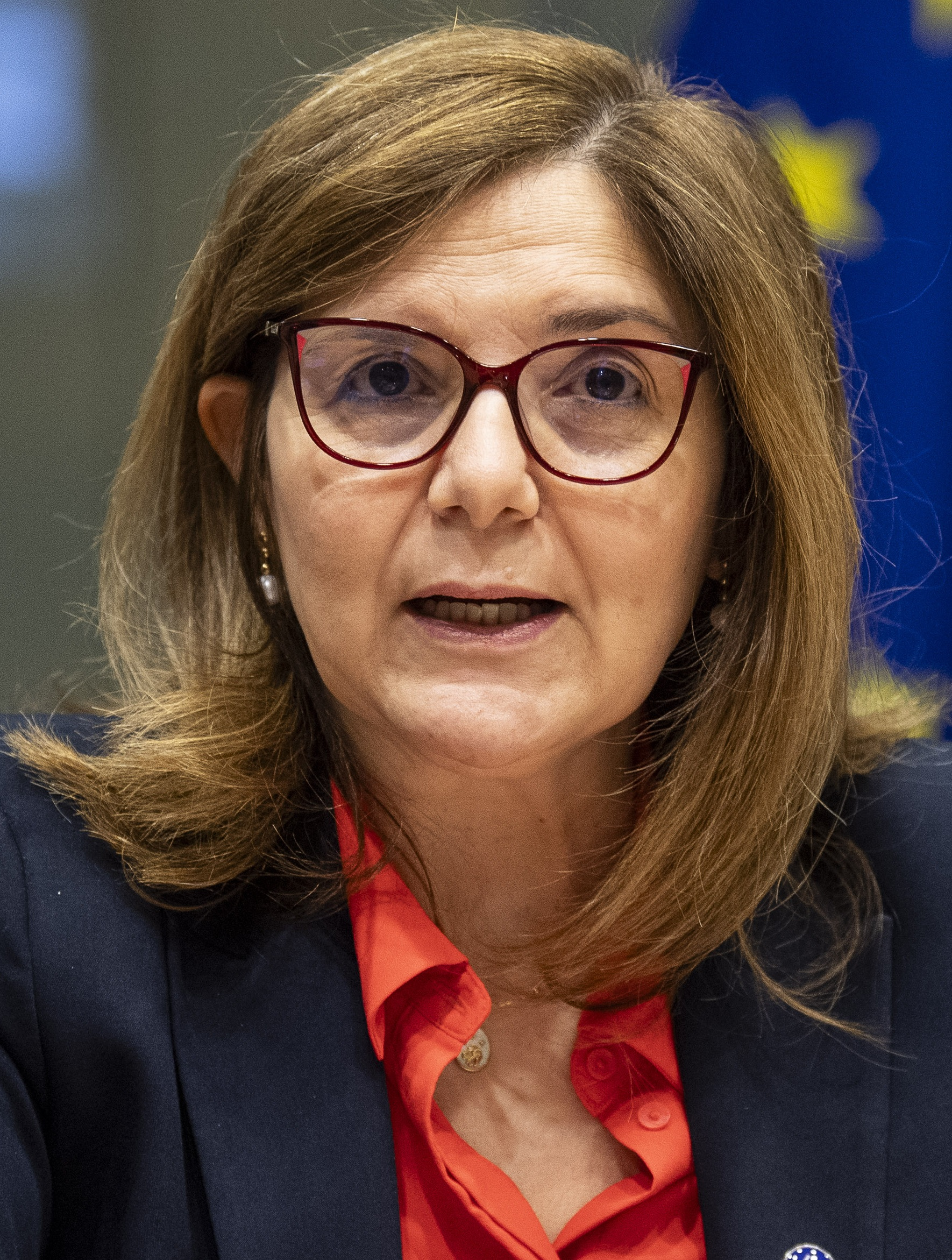
- Incumbent; Pilar Cancela Rodríguez since December 6, 2023
- Ministry of Inclusion, Social Security and Migration; Secretariat of State for Migration
- Style: The Most Excellent (formal); Mr./Ms. Secretary of State (informal)
- Abbreviation: SEM
- Nominator: Minister of Inclusion, Social Security and Migration
- Appointer: The Monarch
- Precursor: Secretary General for Immigration and Emigration
- Formation: May 11, 2000; 26 years ago
- First holder: Enrique Fernández-Miranda y Lozana
- Website: extranjeros.mitramiss.gob.es

The secretary of state for migration (SEM) is a senior minister of the Spanish Ministry of Inclusion, Social Security and Migration responsible for developing the government's policy on foreigners, immigration and emigration. It also attends and advises the minister in the international meetings about these matters, especially in the European Union meetings.

The SEM is appointed by the monarch on the advice of the minister of inclusion, social security and migration. From the secretary of state depends a three departments: the Directorate-General for Migration Management, the Directorate-General for Humanitarian Care and the International Protection Reception System and the Directorate-General for Spanish Citizenry Abroad and Return Policies.

== History ==
Since its inception and its worldwide expansion, Spain has always been a country that has received and sent large amounts of population. Most of the South American population and in a lesser amount the North American population, descends from Spanish ancestry. That has provoked a common culture and language link dozens of countries of all the world, not just Latin American countries but also Asian countries like the Philippines, African countries like Morocco or Equatorial Guinea and North American countries like United States and Canada.

It is not clear when migratory issues took center stage within the Spanish administration, although there is evidence that in 1882, a section was created inside the Ministry of Development destinated to these matters. Before this, there are documents that proves that the Ministry of the Interior, the Ministry of the Navy and the Ministry of Overseas were in charge of overseeing the migrations in the Peninsular Spain and in the Spanish territories in the Americas, Africa, Asia and Oceania and that there were also parliamentary committees to discuss migrations matters.

In the 1920s, the Ministry of Labour assumed the competencies over immigration and emigration that still today maintains. During the dictatorship of Franco, in 1956, it was created the Spanish Institute for Emigration in order to control the emigration of the Spanish population, trying to direct it to countries with cultural links like South American's. This was done through collecting labor information abroad to offer Spaniards more attractive jobs in this type of countries.

In 1985, the Institute was transformed into a Directorate-General being called Directorate-General of the Spanish Institute for Emigration. The name of this directorate was changed in 1991 to Directorate-General for Migration, a more accurate name because since 1985 this directorate had competences not only over emigration, but also over all kind of migrations.

The Directorate-General change its name many times, in 1996 to Directorate-General for Labor and Migration and in 1998 Directorate General for the Regulation of Migrations.

It was in 2000 when this department was created, named Government Delegation for Foreigners and Immigration, with the rank of secretary of state. Later, in 2004, it was renamed as Secretariat of State for Immigration and Emigration and depending on it were three directorate-generals: Directorate-General for Immigration, Directorate-General for Emigration and Directorate-General for the Integration of Immigrants. This Secretariat of State was replaced in 2011 by the General Secretariat fr Immigration and Emigration and was created again in 2018 by the name of Secretariat of State for Migration and the former General Secretariat for Immigration and Emigration was integrated as a subsidiary department of it. The General Secretariat was abolished in 2020.

== Structure ==
Under the secretary of state are the following departments:

- The Directorate-General for Migration Management, in charge of all administrative affairs regarding the general migration policy, infrastructures and European Funds.
- The Directorate-General for Humanitarian Care and the International Protection Reception System, department responsible for the planning, execution and management of humanitarian care and international protection programs.
- The Directorate-General for Spanish Citizenry Abroad and Return Policies, in charge of the management of programs aimed at Spanish emigration abroad and returnees citizens.

The SED also has a personal Cabinet for the coordination of the secretary of state's activities within the European Union and other international forums and organizations in matters of migration and a Deputy Directorate-General for Legal Regime to assist on legal and technical matters regarding national, European and international migration law.

== List of secretaries of state ==
No.	Image	Name	Term of office			Ministers serving under:	Prime Minister appointed by:
No.	Image	Name	Began	Ended	Days of service	Ministers serving under:	Prime Minister appointed by:
1º		Enrique Fernández-Miranda y Lozana	13 May 2000	20 July 2002	798	Jaime Mayor Oreja	José María Aznar
2º		Ignacio González González	20 July 2002	22 November 2003	490	Ángel Acebes	José María Aznar
3º		Gonzalo Robles Orozco	22 November 2003	20 April 2004	150	Ángel Acebes	José María Aznar
4º		Consuelo Rumí	20 April 2004	27 February 2010	2139	Jesús Caldera	José Luis Rodríguez Zapatero
4º		Consuelo Rumí	20 April 2004	27 February 2010	2139	Celestino Corbacho	José Luis Rodríguez Zapatero
5º		Anna Terrón	27 February 2010	31 December 2011	672	Celestino Corbacho	José Luis Rodríguez Zapatero
6º		Consuelo Rumí	19 June 2018	30 January 2020	590	Magdalena Valerio	Pedro Sánchez
7º		Hana Jalloul	30 January 2020	31 March 2021	426	José Luis Escrivá	Pedro Sánchez
-		Santiago Antonio Yerga Cobos; Acting	31 March 2021	7 April 2021	7	José Luis Escrivá	Pedro Sánchez
8º		Jesús Javier Perea Cortijo	7 April 2021	28 June 2022	447	José Luis Escrivá	Pedro Sánchez
9º		Isabel Castro Fernández	28 June 2022	6 December 2023	526	José Luis Escrivá	Pedro Sánchez
10º		Pilar Cancela Rodríguez	6 December 2023	Incumbent	1031	Elma Saiz	Pedro Sánchez
