= Social security in Spain =

Overview of the social security system in Spain

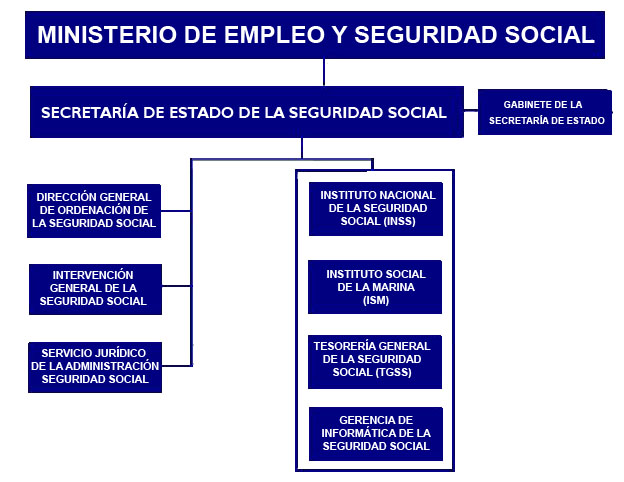
2012 Social Security organization

In Spain, the Social Security (Spanish: Seguridad Social) is the principal system of social protection. The concept of social security first appeared in Spain in 1883 under the Commission for Social Reforms (Spanish: Comisión de Reformas Sociales), it was expanded several times during the twentieth century and finally the right to social security was enshrined in the Spanish Constitution of 1978 under Article 41 which states "that the public authorities shall maintain a public social security system for all citizens, guaranteeing sufficient support and social benefits in situations of need, especially in the event of unemployment, and that the support and additional benefits shall be free".

== History ==
The starting point of protection policies is established during the Liberal government of Posada Herrera, who set up in October 1883 a government commission — the Social Reform Commission— to examine issues that were of interest to the improvement and well-being of the working class. In 1900 it was approved the first law of the Social Security System, the Labour Accidents Act and in 1903 the Commission was replaced by a government agency, the Social Reform Institute (which lasted until 1924). The rest of the century had a growing trend in terms of welfare legislation, with the 1919 Worker Retirement Act; the 1923 Obligatory Maternity Insurance; the 1931 Forced Unemployment Insurance Act; the 1947 Obligatory Old-Age and Disability Insurance (SOVI); the 1963 Social Security Bases Act; and the 1966 General Social Security Act, among others.

=== 1978 Spanish Constitution ===
The right to social security was enshrined in Article 41 of the Spanish Constitution of 1978 and envisages a varied system of benefits structured on three levels: basic social security, assistance to cover professional and employment categories and supplementary benefits.

Moreover, article 149.1.17 ª provides that the State has exclusive jurisdiction over basic legislation and financial regulation of the social security system, without prejudice to the performance of its services by the autonomous communities.

As an important piece of evolving legislation, social security in Spain is regulated by Royal Decree 1/1994 of June 20, by adopting the text of the General Social Security Act (BOE of 29). This regulation has been amended on numerous occasions.

== Structure ==
The Spanish social security system is structured as follows:

1. General regulations, as most widely applied plus supplemental (stop-gap) others;
2. Special regulations that assess professional occupations by their nature, particular conditions of time and place or the nature of production processes:

1. Agriculture,
2. Self-employed,
3. Domestic employees,
4. Coal miners
5. Port and sea workers
6. Civil Servants (Muface)

=== Agencies ===
The management and administration of the Spanish Social Security System is done by two kind of government agencies: Management Entities and Common Servicies. The first type provide social services while the second supports the first type with any kind of general service. Most of them are tutored by the Ministry of Inclusion, Social Security and Migration, through the Secretary of State for Social Security and Pensions, although some depend on the Ministry of Health and the Ministry of Social Affairs.

The Management Entities are:

- The National Institute of the Social Security (INSS).
- The National Institute for Health Management (INGESA).
- The Institute for the Elderly and Social Services (IMSERSO).
- The Social Institute of Sea Workers (ISM).

The Common Servicies are:

- The General Treasury of the Social Security (TGSS).
- The Social Security IT Department (GISS).
- The Legal Service of the Social Security Administration (SJASS).

== Membership and contributions ==
Membership is obligatory, unique and covers the entire life of the person included in the system.

Levels of security must reflect the initial and subsequent contributor's working life.

Contributions (or payment of fees) are required from the commencement of a work activity (whether or not they have affiliated formally, at whatever level).

Class	Category	Minimum	Ceiling	Employer				Employee			
				Pension & Accident	Unemployment	Insolvency	Training	Pension & Accident	Unemployment	Insolvency	Training
1	Post Graduates	€1,051.1	€3,425.7	23.6%	5.5%	0.2%	0.6%	4.7%	1.55%		0.1%
2	Graduates & professionals	€872.1	€3,425.7	23.6%	5.5%	0.2%	0.6%	4.7%	1.55%		0.1%
3	Administrative	€758.7	€3,425.7	23.6%	5.5%	0.2%	0.6%	4.7%	1.55%		0.1%
4,5,6 & 7	Non qualified	€753	€3,425.7	23.6%	5.5%	0.2%	0.6%	4.7%	1.55%		0.1%
8,9,10 & 11	Under 18 & Labourers	€25.1	€114.9	23.6%	5.5%	0.2%	0.6%	4.7%	1.55%		0.1%

== Scope of Protection ==
The purpose of social security is to guarantee to those people who fall within the scope of the act, (those who carry out an occupational activity, or that meet the requirements of the non-contributory category, such as family members or dependants for whom they have responsibility), adequate protection against those contingencies and situations contemplated by the law.

The scope of the act for the contributory category, includes those Spanish nationals who reside in Spain, and non-Spanish citizens who are residing or are staying legally in Spain, provided that in both cases they are carrying out their activities on Spanish national territory, and covers:

- Employees
- Self-employed or sole proprietor businesses
- Members of Associated Work Co-operatives
- Students
- Civil Servants

Protection provided by social security will include (cover):

1. Healthcare (primary or hospitalisation) in the case of maternity, common, occupational illness or accidents, whether or not occupational;
2. Professional care for said illnesses or accidents;
3. Benefits for the following:

- Temporary incapacity
- Maternity
- Death and survival
- And for both contributory and non-contributory schemes:

- Invalidity
- Retirement
- Unemployment

1. Employment retraining, rehabilitation of invalids and assistance for senior citizens;
2. Also, in addition to the above, other social service benefits.

In practice the non contributory category is understood to cover Spanish nationals resident in Spain.

The social security reserve fund for year ending 2007 was €45,715 million euros.

== See also ==
- Pensions in Spain
- Spanish National Health System
- Unemployment benefits in Spain
