= Comptroller General of the State =

Position in the Ministry of the Treasury of Spain

Comptroller General the State Administration
- Coat of Arms used by the Government

- Incumbent; Pablo Arellano Pardo since 23 June 2018
- Ministry of Finance; Secretariat of State for Budget and Expenditure
- Style: The Most Excellent
- Abbreviation: IGAE
- Reports to: Secretary of State for Budget and Expenditure
- Nominator: Minister of Finance
- Appointer: The Monarch
- Term length: No fixed term
- Precursor: Director-General for Accounting
- Inaugural holder: Mariano Cancio Villaamil
- Formation: June 25, 1870; 156 years ago
- Website: www.igae.pap.hacienda.gob.es

The Comptroller General of the State Administration is the head of the Office of the Comptroller General of the State Administration (Spanish: Intervención General de la Administración del Estado, IGAE), the Spanish government agency responsible for internal auditing and accounting.

The position was first established under Section 52 of the Provisional Law on Treasury Administration and Accounting of 25 June 1870, which granted the Director-General for Accounting the status of Comptroller General of the State Administration. Four years later, in 1874, the Directorate-General for Accounting was abolished and reorganized as the present Office of the Comptroller General of the State Administration.

The Comptroller General is appointed by the Monarch on the advice of the Finance Minister. The Comptroller General, with the rank of under-secretary, reports directly to the Secretary of State for Budget and Expenditure.

== Purpose ==
The Comptroller oversees the IGAE agency, which has two core functions. Its primary function is that of a supervisory agency. It is responsible for verifying – through previous monitoring of legality, continuous financial control, public audits, and financial control of subsidies – that the public sector's economic and financial activity complies with the principles of legality, economy, efficiency and effectiveness.

Its second function is to act as the center for the management of public accounts. It is responsible for providing reliable, complete, professional and independent accounting information about public management. In this regard, it is responsible for drafting the public sector's financial accounts according to the guidance set out by the European System of Accounts. The most specific result of this is the determination of public deficit, which is essential to the nation's economic life. It calculates the deficit for the central government and each of its sub-sectors.

== Organisation ==
A large number of officials and administrative bodies depend upon the Comptroller General. To carry out its functions, the Office of the Comptroller General has offices known as Delegated Comptroller's Offices (Spanish: intervenciones delegadas) in all the General State Administration bodies, including ministerial departments, government agencies and regional and local bodies of the State Administration. In addition, the law specifies that certain government bodies must have their own comptrollerships: the Ministry of Defence (IGD), the Social Security Administration (IGSS) and the General Secretariat for the Treasury and International Financing, among others, although they all depend functionally on the Comptroller General. In total, the agency has about 2,000 employees.

In addition to the bodies mentioned above, the central services of the Office of the Comptroller General comprise:

- The National Audit Office, further divided into six divisions.
- The National Accounting Office, divided into three divisions.
- The Deputy Directorate-General for Comptrollership and Financial Control.
- The Deputy Directorate-General for Studies and Coordination.
- The Deputy Directorate-General for Organization, Planning and Resource Management.
- The Budget IT Office, divided into five divisions.
- The Technical Cabinet, responsible for providing support and immediate assistance to the Comptroller General.
- The National Anti-Fraud Coordination Service.

== List of comptrollers general ==
For the purpose of this list, the date used is the date on which the decree of appointment or dismissal received royal assent, which may differ from the date of publication or of the effective taking of office.

Denotes an Acting Comptroller General.

Name	Start	End	Duration	Party	Government		Ref.
Mariano Cancio Villaamil (1824–1894)	9 August 1869	25 January 1870	1 year, 190 days	Independent	The Marquess of Castillejos	The Duke of the Tower (regent) (1869–1871)	
Mariano Cancio Villaamil (1824–1894)	25 January 1870 (Note: Section 52 of Provisional Law on Treasury Administration and Accounting of 25 June 1870 granted the Director-General for Accounting the status of Comptroller General of the State Administration.)	15 February 1871	1 year, 190 days	Independent	Juan Bautista Topete	The Duke of the Tower (regent) (1869–1871)	
Mariano Cancio Villaamil (1824–1894)	25 January 1870	15 February 1871	1 year, 190 days	Independent	The Duke of the Tower	The Duke of the Tower (regent) (1869–1871)	
Félix de Bona (1822–1889)	15 February 1871	17 October 1871	244 days	Independent	The Duke of the Tower	The Duke of the Tower (regent) (1869–1871)	
Félix de Bona (1822–1889)	15 February 1871	17 October 1871	244 days	Independent	Manuel Ruiz Zorrilla	Amadeo I (1871–1873)	
Félix de Bona (1822–1889)	15 February 1871	17 October 1871	244 days	Independent	The Marquess of San Rafael	Amadeo I (1871–1873)	
Gabriel Secades	17 October 1871	24 February 1872	130 days	Independent	The Marquess of San Rafael	Amadeo I (1871–1873)	
Gabriel Secades	17 October 1871	24 February 1872	130 days	Independent	Práxedes Mateo Sagasta	Amadeo I (1871–1873)	
Ramón López Tejada	24 February 1872	28 June 1872	125 days	Independent	Práxedes Mateo Sagasta	Amadeo I (1871–1873)	
Ramón López Tejada	24 February 1872	28 June 1872	125 days	Independent	The Duke of the Tower	Amadeo I (1871–1873)	
Ramón López Tejada	24 February 1872	28 June 1872	125 days	Independent	Manuel Ruiz Zorrilla	Amadeo I (1871–1873)	
Félix de Bona (1822–1889)	28 June 1872	16 March 1873	261 days	Independent	Manuel Ruiz Zorrilla	Amadeo I (1871–1873)	
Félix de Bona (1822–1889)	28 June 1872	16 March 1873	261 days	Independent	Estanislao Figueras	List of presidents of the First Republic	
Romualdo Lafuente (1820–1876)	16 March 1873	12 June 1873	88 days	Federal Democratic Republican	Estanislao Figueras	List of presidents of the First Republic	
José Ramón de Oya	12 June 1873	1 July 1873	19 days	Independent	Francesc Pi i Margall	List of presidents of the First Republic	
Manuel Francisco Álvarez Capra	1 July 1873	7 January 1874	190 days	Independent	Francesc Pi i Margall	List of presidents of the First Republic	
Manuel Francisco Álvarez Capra	1 July 1873	7 January 1874	190 days	Independent	Nicolás Salmerón	List of presidents of the First Republic	
Manuel Francisco Álvarez Capra	1 July 1873	7 January 1874	190 days	Independent	Emilio Castelar	List of presidents of the First Republic	
José Ramón de Oya	7 January 1874	1 August 1878	4 years, 206 days	Independent	The Duke of the Tower	List of presidents of the First Republic	
José Ramón de Oya	7 January 1874	1 August 1878	4 years, 206 days	Independent	The Marquess of Sierra Bullones	List of presidents of the First Republic	
José Ramón de Oya	7 January 1874	1 August 1878	4 years, 206 days	Independent	Práxedes Mateo Sagasta	Alfonso XII (1874–1885)	
José Ramón de Oya	7 January 1874	1 August 1878	4 years, 206 days	Independent	Antonio Cánovas del Castillo	Alfonso XII (1874–1885)	
José Ramón de Oya	7 January 1874	1 August 1878	4 years, 206 days	Independent	Joaquín Jovellar y Soler	Alfonso XII (1874–1885)	
José Ramón de Oya	7 January 1874	1 August 1878	4 years, 206 days	Independent	Antonio Cánovas del Castillo	Alfonso XII (1874–1885)	
José Ramón de Oya	7 January 1874	1 August 1878	4 years, 206 days	Independent	Arsenio Martínez Campos	Alfonso XII (1874–1885)	
José Ramón de Oya	7 January 1874	1 August 1878	4 years, 206 days	Independent	Antonio Cánovas del Castillo	Alfonso XII (1874–1885)	
The Marquess of Pozo Rubio (1848–1905)	1 August 1878	21 March 1880	1 year, 233 days	Conservative	Antonio Cánovas del Castillo	Alfonso XII (1874–1885)	
Isidoro Cabañas	21 March 1880	8 July 1880	109 days	Independent	Antonio Cánovas del Castillo	Alfonso XII (1874–1885)	
José Ramón de Oya	8 July 1880	30 June 1887	6 years, 357 days	Independent	Antonio Cánovas del Castillo	Alfonso XII (1874–1885)	
José Ramón de Oya	8 July 1880	30 June 1887	6 years, 357 days	Independent	Práxedes Mateo Sagasta	Alfonso XII (1874–1885)	
José Ramón de Oya	8 July 1880	30 June 1887	6 years, 357 days	Independent	José Posada Herrera	Alfonso XII (1874–1885)	
José Ramón de Oya	8 July 1880	30 June 1887	6 years, 357 days	Independent	Antonio Cánovas del Castillo	Alfonso XII (1874–1885)	
José Ramón de Oya	8 July 1880	30 June 1887	6 years, 357 days	Independent	Práxedes Mateo Sagasta	Alfonso XIII (1886–1931)	
Ángel González de la Peña	30 June 1887	16 July 1895	8 years, 16 days	Independent	Práxedes Mateo Sagasta	Alfonso XIII (1886–1931)	
Ángel González de la Peña	30 June 1887	16 July 1895	8 years, 16 days	Independent	Antonio Cánovas del Castillo	Alfonso XIII (1886–1931)	
Ángel González de la Peña	30 June 1887	16 July 1895	8 years, 16 days	Independent	Práxedes Mateo Sagasta	Alfonso XIII (1886–1931)	
Ángel González de la Peña	30 June 1887	16 July 1895	8 years, 16 days	Independent	Antonio Cánovas del Castillo†	Alfonso XIII (1886–1931)	
Adrián Mínguez y Ranz (Note: Acting during his illness: Ángel González de la Peña, Director-General for Direct Taxes (31 July to 30 August 1899))	16 July 1895	14 September 1906	11 years, 60 days	Independent	Antonio Cánovas del Castillo†	Alfonso XIII (1886–1931)	
Adrián Mínguez y Ranz	16 July 1895	14 September 1906	11 years, 60 days	Independent	Marcelo Azcárraga	Alfonso XIII (1886–1931)	
Adrián Mínguez y Ranz	16 July 1895	14 September 1906	11 years, 60 days	Independent	Práxedes Mateo Sagasta	Alfonso XIII (1886–1931)	
Adrián Mínguez y Ranz	16 July 1895	14 September 1906	11 years, 60 days	Independent	Francisco Silvela	Alfonso XIII (1886–1931)	
Adrián Mínguez y Ranz	16 July 1895	14 September 1906	11 years, 60 days	Independent	Marcelo Azcárraga	Alfonso XIII (1886–1931)	
Adrián Mínguez y Ranz	16 July 1895	14 September 1906	11 years, 60 days	Independent	Práxedes Mateo Sagasta	Alfonso XIII (1886–1931)	
Adrián Mínguez y Ranz	16 July 1895	14 September 1906	11 years, 60 days	Independent	Francisco Silvela	Alfonso XIII (1886–1931)	
Adrián Mínguez y Ranz	16 July 1895	14 September 1906	11 years, 60 days	Independent	The Marquess of Pozo Rubio	Alfonso XIII (1886–1931)	
Adrián Mínguez y Ranz	16 July 1895	14 September 1906	11 years, 60 days	Independent	Antonio Maura	Alfonso XIII (1886–1931)	
Adrián Mínguez y Ranz	16 July 1895	14 September 1906	11 years, 60 days	Independent	Marcelo Azcárraga	Alfonso XIII (1886–1931)	
Adrián Mínguez y Ranz	16 July 1895	14 September 1906	11 years, 60 days	Independent	The Marquess of Pozo Rubio	Alfonso XIII (1886–1931)	
Adrián Mínguez y Ranz	16 July 1895	14 September 1906	11 years, 60 days	Independent	Eugenio Montero Ríos	Alfonso XIII (1886–1931)	
Adrián Mínguez y Ranz	16 July 1895	14 September 1906	11 years, 60 days	Independent	Segismundo Moret	Alfonso XIII (1886–1931)	
Adrián Mínguez y Ranz	16 July 1895	14 September 1906	11 years, 60 days	Independent	José López Domínguez	Alfonso XIII (1886–1931)	
José María de Retes y Muyraní	14 September 1906	1 September 1916	9 years, 353 days	Independent	José López Domínguez	Alfonso XIII (1886–1931)	
José María de Retes y Muyraní	14 September 1906	1 September 1916	9 years, 353 days	Independent	Segismundo Moret	Alfonso XIII (1886–1931)	
José María de Retes y Muyraní	14 September 1906	1 September 1916	9 years, 353 days	Independent	The Marquess of Vega de Armijo	Alfonso XIII (1886–1931)	
José María de Retes y Muyraní	14 September 1906	1 September 1916	9 years, 353 days	Independent	Antonio Maura	Alfonso XIII (1886–1931)	
José María de Retes y Muyraní	14 September 1906	1 September 1916	9 years, 353 days	Independent	Segismundo Moret	Alfonso XIII (1886–1931)	
José María de Retes y Muyraní	14 September 1906	1 September 1916	9 years, 353 days	Independent	José Canalejas y Méndez†	Alfonso XIII (1886–1931)	
José María de Retes y Muyraní	14 September 1906	1 September 1916	9 years, 353 days	Independent	The Marquess of Alhucemas (Note: He acted as acting prime minister after the assassination of José Canalejas on 12 November 1912)	Alfonso XIII (1886–1931)	
José María de Retes y Muyraní	14 September 1906	1 September 1916	9 years, 353 days	Independent	The Count of Romanones	Alfonso XIII (1886–1931)	
José María de Retes y Muyraní	14 September 1906	1 September 1916	9 years, 353 days	Independent	Eduardo Dato	Alfonso XIII (1886–1931)	
José María de Retes y Muyraní	14 September 1906	1 September 1916	9 years, 353 days	Independent	The Count of Romanones	Alfonso XIII (1886–1931)	
Enrique Illana y Sánchez de Vargas (1865–1942)	1 September 1916	26 February 1924	7 years, 178 days	Independent	The Count of Romanones	Alfonso XIII (1886–1931)	
Enrique Illana y Sánchez de Vargas (1865–1942)	1 September 1916	26 February 1924	7 years, 178 days	Independent	The Marquess of Alhucemas	Alfonso XIII (1886–1931)	
Enrique Illana y Sánchez de Vargas (1865–1942)	1 September 1916	26 February 1924	7 years, 178 days	Independent	Eduardo Dato	Alfonso XIII (1886–1931)	
Enrique Illana y Sánchez de Vargas (1865–1942)	1 September 1916	26 February 1924	7 years, 178 days	Independent	The Marquess of Alhucemas	Alfonso XIII (1886–1931)	
Enrique Illana y Sánchez de Vargas (1865–1942)	1 September 1916	26 February 1924	7 years, 178 days	Independent	Antonio Maura	Alfonso XIII (1886–1931)	
Enrique Illana y Sánchez de Vargas (1865–1942)	1 September 1916	26 February 1924	7 years, 178 days	Independent	The Marquess of Alhucemas	Alfonso XIII (1886–1931)	
Enrique Illana y Sánchez de Vargas (1865–1942)	1 September 1916	26 February 1924	7 years, 178 days	Independent	The Count of Romanones	Alfonso XIII (1886–1931)	
Enrique Illana y Sánchez de Vargas (1865–1942)	1 September 1916	26 February 1924	7 years, 178 days	Independent	Antonio Maura	Alfonso XIII (1886–1931)	
Enrique Illana y Sánchez de Vargas (1865–1942)	1 September 1916	26 February 1924	7 years, 178 days	Independent	Joaquín Sánchez de Toca	Alfonso XIII (1886–1931)	
Enrique Illana y Sánchez de Vargas (1865–1942)	1 September 1916	26 February 1924	7 years, 178 days	Independent	Manuel Allendesalazar	Alfonso XIII (1886–1931)	
Enrique Illana y Sánchez de Vargas (1865–1942)	1 September 1916	26 February 1924	7 years, 178 days	Independent	Eduardo Dato†	Alfonso XIII (1886–1931)	
Enrique Illana y Sánchez de Vargas (1865–1942)	1 September 1916	26 February 1924	7 years, 178 days	Independent	The Count of Bugallal (Note: He acted acting prime minister after the assassination of Eduardo Dato from March 8 to March 13, 1921)	Alfonso XIII (1886–1931)	
Enrique Illana y Sánchez de Vargas (1865–1942)	1 September 1916	26 February 1924	7 years, 178 days	Independent	Manuel Allendesalazar	Alfonso XIII (1886–1931)	
Enrique Illana y Sánchez de Vargas (1865–1942)	1 September 1916	26 February 1924	7 years, 178 days	Independent	Antonio Maura	Alfonso XIII (1886–1931)	
Enrique Illana y Sánchez de Vargas (1865–1942)	1 September 1916	26 February 1924	7 years, 178 days	Independent	José Sánchez-Guerra y Martínez	Alfonso XIII (1886–1931)	
Enrique Illana y Sánchez de Vargas (1865–1942)	1 September 1916	26 February 1924	7 years, 178 days	Independent	The Marquess of Alhucemas	Alfonso XIII (1886–1931)	
Enrique Illana y Sánchez de Vargas (1865–1942)	1 September 1916	26 February 1924	7 years, 178 days	Independent	The Marquess of Estella	Alfonso XIII (1886–1931)	
José Corral Larre (1866–1938)	12 April 1924	28 June 1924	123 days	Independent	The Marquess of Estella	Alfonso XIII (1886–1931)	
Office abolished during this period. Its functions were divided between the Supreme Court of Public Finance and the Directorate-General for the Treasury and Accounting.						Alfonso XIII (1886–1931)	
Enrique Illana y Sánchez de Vargas (1865–1942)	4 February 1930	23 April 1931	1 year, 78 days	Independent	The Count of Xauen	Alfonso XIII (1886–1931)	
Enrique Illana y Sánchez de Vargas (1865–1942)	4 February 1930	23 April 1931	1 year, 78 days	Independent	Juan Bautista Aznar-Cabañas	Alfonso XIII (1886–1931)	
Enrique Illana y Sánchez de Vargas (1865–1942)	4 February 1930	23 April 1931	1 year, 78 days	Independent	Niceto Alcalá-Zamora	Niceto Alcalá-Zamora (1931–1936)	
Adolfo Sixto Hontán (died 1938)	27 April 1931	7 October 1938†	7 years, 167 days	Independent	Niceto Alcalá-Zamora	Niceto Alcalá-Zamora (1931–1936)	
Adolfo Sixto Hontán (died 1938)	27 April 1931	7 October 1938†	7 years, 167 days	Independent	Manuel Azaña	Niceto Alcalá-Zamora (1931–1936)	
Adolfo Sixto Hontán (died 1938)	27 April 1931	7 October 1938†	7 years, 167 days	Independent	Alejandro Lerroux	Niceto Alcalá-Zamora (1931–1936)	
Adolfo Sixto Hontán (died 1938)	27 April 1931	7 October 1938†	7 years, 167 days	Independent	Diego Martínez Barrio	Niceto Alcalá-Zamora (1931–1936)	
Adolfo Sixto Hontán (died 1938)	27 April 1931	7 October 1938†	7 years, 167 days	Independent	Alejandro Lerroux	Niceto Alcalá-Zamora (1931–1936)	
Adolfo Sixto Hontán (died 1938)	27 April 1931	7 October 1938†	7 years, 167 days	Independent	Ricardo Samper	Niceto Alcalá-Zamora (1931–1936)	
Adolfo Sixto Hontán (died 1938)	27 April 1931	7 October 1938†	7 years, 167 days	Independent	Alejandro Lerroux	Niceto Alcalá-Zamora (1931–1936)	
Adolfo Sixto Hontán (died 1938)	27 April 1931	7 October 1938†	7 years, 167 days	Independent	Joaquín Chapaprieta	Niceto Alcalá-Zamora (1931–1936)	
Adolfo Sixto Hontán (died 1938)	27 April 1931	7 October 1938†	7 years, 167 days	Independent	Manuel Portela Valladares	Niceto Alcalá-Zamora (1931–1936)	
Adolfo Sixto Hontán (died 1938)	27 April 1931	7 October 1938†	7 years, 167 days	Independent	Manuel Azaña	Niceto Alcalá-Zamora (1931–1936)	
Adolfo Sixto Hontán (died 1938)	27 April 1931	7 October 1938†	7 years, 167 days	Independent	Augusto Barcia Trelles (Note: Acting prime minister from 10 to 13 May 1936)	Manuel Azaña (1936–1939)	
Adolfo Sixto Hontán (died 1938)	27 April 1931	7 October 1938†	7 years, 167 days	Independent	Santiago Casares Quiroga	Manuel Azaña (1936–1939)	
Adolfo Sixto Hontán (died 1938)	27 April 1931	7 October 1938†	7 years, 167 days	Independent	Diego Martínez Barrio	Manuel Azaña (1936–1939)	
Adolfo Sixto Hontán (died 1938)	27 April 1931	7 October 1938†	7 years, 167 days	Independent	José Giral	Manuel Azaña (1936–1939)	
Adolfo Sixto Hontán (died 1938)	27 April 1931	7 October 1938†	7 years, 167 days	Independent	Francisco Largo Caballero	Manuel Azaña (1936–1939)	
Adolfo Sixto Hontán (died 1938)	27 April 1931	7 October 1938†	7 years, 167 days	Independent	Juan Negrín	Manuel Azaña (1936–1939)	
José María Fábregas del Pilar (1887–1959)	16 November 1938	17 March 1939	121 days	Independent	Juan Negrín	Manuel Azaña (1936–1939)	
José María Fábregas del Pilar (1887–1959)	16 November 1938	17 March 1939	121 days	Independent	National Defence Council	José Miaja (1939)	
Fernando Duque Sampayo (1890–1977)	17 March 1939	31 March 1939	14 days	Independent	National Defence Council	José Miaja (1939)	
Pedro Gárate Pera (Note: Comptroller General of the Rebel side.) (1871–1942)	8 February 1938	24 February 1942†	4 years, 16 days	National Movement	Franco I	Francisco Franco (1939–1975)	
Pedro Gárate Pera (1871–1942)	8 February 1938	24 February 1942†	4 years, 16 days	National Movement	Franco II	Francisco Franco (1939–1975)	
Fernando Duque Sampayo (1890–1977)	24 February 1942	13 March 1942	17 days	Independent	Franco II	Francisco Franco (1939–1975)	
Eugenio Gómez Pereira (1885–1968)	13 March 1942	7 September 1951	9 years, 178 days	National Movement	Franco II	Francisco Franco (1939–1975)	
Eugenio Gómez Pereira (1885–1968)	13 March 1942	7 September 1951	9 years, 178 days	National Movement	Franco III	Francisco Franco (1939–1975)	
Juan Manuel Rozas Eguiburu (1900–1988)	7 September 1951	21 July 1965	13 years, 317 days	National Movement	Franco IV	Francisco Franco (1939–1975)	
Juan Manuel Rozas Eguiburu (1900–1988)	7 September 1951	21 July 1965	13 years, 317 days	National Movement	Franco V	Francisco Franco (1939–1975)	
Juan Manuel Rozas Eguiburu (1900–1988)	7 September 1951	21 July 1965	13 years, 317 days	National Movement	Franco VI	Francisco Franco (1939–1975)	
Felicísimo de Blas Hernando (1918–1984)	21 July 1965	28 June 1973	7 years, 342 days	National Movement	Franco VII	Francisco Franco (1939–1975)	
Felicísimo de Blas Hernando (1918–1984)	21 July 1965	28 June 1973	7 years, 342 days	National Movement	Franco VIII	Francisco Franco (1939–1975)	
Felicísimo de Blas Hernando (1918–1984)	21 July 1965	28 June 1973	7 years, 342 days	National Movement	Luis Carrero Blanco†	Francisco Franco (1939–1975)	
Joaquín Collada Andréu (1910–2004)	28 June 1973	6 June 1976	2 years, 344 days	National Movement	Luis Carrero Blanco†	Francisco Franco (1939–1975)	
Joaquín Collada Andréu (1910–2004)	28 June 1973	6 June 1976	2 years, 344 days	National Movement	The Duke of Fernández-Miranda (acting)	Francisco Franco (1939–1975)	
Joaquín Collada Andréu (1910–2004)	28 June 1973	6 June 1976	2 years, 344 days	National Movement	The Marquess of Arias Navarro	Francisco Franco (1939–1975)	
Augusto Gutiérrez Robles (1920–2002)	6 June 1976	18 July 1980	4 years, 42 days	National Movement	The Marquess of Arias Navarro	Juan Carlos I (1975–2014)	
Augusto Gutiérrez Robles (1920–2002)	6 June 1976	18 July 1980	4 years, 42 days	Independent	The Duke of Suárez	Juan Carlos I (1975–2014)	
Ignacio Montaño Jiménez (born 1936)	18 July 1980	22 December 1982	2 years, 157 days	Independent	The Duke of Suárez	Juan Carlos I (1975–2014)	
Ignacio Montaño Jiménez (born 1936)	18 July 1980	22 December 1982	2 years, 157 days	Independent	The Marquess of Ría de Ribadeo	Juan Carlos I (1975–2014)	
Ignacio Montaño Jiménez (born 1936)	18 July 1980	22 December 1982	2 years, 157 days	Independent	Felipe González	Juan Carlos I (1975–2014)	
Juan Francisco Martín Seco (born 1944)	22 December 1982	8 February 1984	1 year, 48 days	Independent	Felipe González	Juan Carlos I (1975–2014)	
Ricardo Bolufer Nieto	22 February 1984	7 October 1988	4 years, 242 days	Independent	Felipe González	Juan Carlos I (1975–2014)	
Juan Aracil Martín	7 October 1988	22 March 1991	2 years, 166 days	Independent	Felipe González	Juan Carlos I (1975–2014)	
Purificación Esteso Ruiz (1946–2022)	22 March 1991	15 July 1994	3 years, 115 days	Independent	Felipe González	Juan Carlos I (1975–2014)	
Gregorio Máñez Vindel	15 July 1994	7 May 1996	1 year, 297 days	Independent	Felipe González	Juan Carlos I (1975–2014)	
Rafael Muñoz López-Carmona (born 1952)	7 May 1996	10 September 1999	3 years, 126 days	Independent	José María Aznar	Juan Carlos I (1975–2014)	
Alicia Díaz Zurro (born 1964)	10 September 1999	23 April 2004	4 years, 226 days	Independent	José María Aznar	Juan Carlos I (1975–2014)	
José Alberto Pérez Pérez (born 1963)	23 April 2004	13 January 2012	7 years, 265 days	Independent	José Luis Rodríguez Zapatero	Juan Carlos I (1975–2014)	
José Alberto Pérez Pérez (born 1963)	23 April 2004	13 January 2012	7 years, 265 days	Independent	Mariano Rajoy	Juan Carlos I (1975–2014)	
José Carlos Alcalde Hernández (born 1956)	13 January 2012	25 November 2016	4 years, 317 days	Independent	Mariano Rajoy	Felipe VI (2014–present)	
María Luisa Lamela Diaz	25 November 2016	22 June 2018	1 year, 209 days	Independent	Mariano Rajoy	Felipe VI (2014–present)	
Pablo Arellano Pardo (born 1968)	22 June 2018	Incumbent	8 years, 77 days	Independent	Pedro Sánchez	Felipe VI (2014–present)	
