= Servicio Cántabro de Salud =

Cantabrian Health Service
- Servicio Cántabro de Salud (SCS)

Health Care Service overview
- Formed: 2001
- Preceding Health Care Service: Instituto Nacional de la Salud (INSALUD)
- Type: Public Provider
- Jurisdiction: Government of Cantabria
- Parent department: Councillery of Health

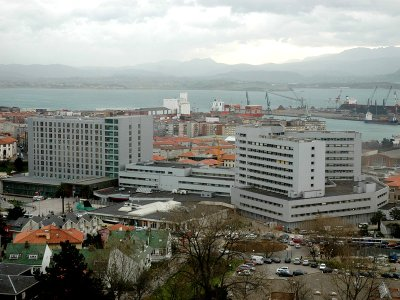
Marqués de Valdecilla University Hospital

The Cantabrian Health Service (Spanish: Servicio Cántabro de Salud, SCS) is an autonomous public health organization which depends on the Government of Cantabria. It was created by the Law of Cantabria 10/2001 of December 28.

It is part of the Spanish National Health System and is responsible, in Cantabria, for the public provision of the health service, both care and prevention and rehabilitation.

In 2006, The Cantabria Health Service had 7,458 professionals in its workforce to provide healthcare through its network of primary care and specialized care.

== Functions ==
- Management of health benefits in the field of health promotion and protection, disease prevention, health care and rehabilitation in the territory of the Autonomous Community of Cantabria.
- Administration, management, control and inspection of the Institutions, centers and those health services that are under their dependence, organically and functionally.
- Management of the financial, material and human resources that are granted to perform the functions mentioned above.
- Adoption of preventive measures for the protection of health when there is or is reasonably suspected an imminent and extraordinary risk to health.
- The execution and, where appropriate, coordination of teaching and research programs.

== Structure ==
The Cantabrian Health Service is structured territorially in four areas called Health Areas: Santander, Laredo, Torrelavega and Reinosa. Your organization is coordinated through the following subdirectories:

- Administrative Coordination
- Healthcare
- Economic Management and Infrastructures
- Human Resources
- Development and Quality Assisted

== Primary health care ==
It is the first level of access of citizens to the Public Health System of Cantabria and among its characterizing elements are the offer of comprehensive health care through preventive, curative and rehabilitative care. It also includes health promotion, health education and environmental health surveillance. On October 18, 2010, the functional structure was created by creating the Laredo Primary Care Primary Management, which includes the former Specialized Care Management and the Primary Care Management Area II as well as the Primary Care Management that includes areas I, III and IV.

=== Primary Care Services ===
The primary care services in Cantabria are constituted in primary care districts, which are known as basic health areas, of which in 2008 there were a total of 37. In each of these zones are located health centers and clinics, Where primary health care is provided to the population. Cantabria has a total of 37 health centers and 122 offices.

== Specialized health care ==
It provides the population with the technical and human resources necessary for appropriate diagnosis, treatment and rehabilitation, which can not be solved at the primary care level. The Cantabrian Health Service manages the five public hospitals in Cantabria.

=== Specialized care services ===
Among the functions of the specialized attention are:

- Medical and surgical support to Primary Health Care through:
  - Hospital Services
    - Marqués de Valdecilla University Hospital: it is located in Santander and is the reference center for all of Cantabria.
    - Sierrallana Hospital: is located in Torrelavega and serves the central and western area of Cantabria.
    - Comarcal Hospital of Laredo, it is located in the town of the same name and serves the eastern part of the region.
    - Tres Mares Hospital: it is located in Reinosa and serves the south of Cantabria.
    - Santa Cruz Hospital: it is located in Liencres, very close to Santander, and actually serves as a complementary hospital of Valdecilla in some services.
- Planning of the Specialized Attention in the Cantabrian Health Service, coordinating the actions of the Area Management and Addresses.
- Participation in teaching and research activities.
- Coordination with Primary Care through Specific Programs, continued training and establishment of joint protocols for certain pathologies or processes.

== See also ==
- Spanish National Health System
- Health in Spain
- Marqués de Valdecilla University Hospital
