= Arturo Pacheco Altamirano =

Chilean painter and diplomat (1905–1978)

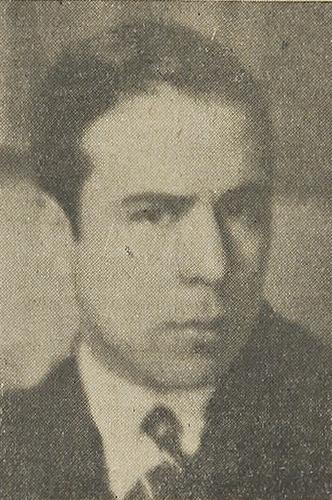
- Pacheco in 1942
- Born: 24 April 1905; Chillán, Chile
- Died: 30 December 1978 (aged 73); Santiago, Chile
- Occupations: Painter; diplomat
- Spouse: Victoria Ahumada de Pacheco

Arturo Pacheco Altamirano (24 April 1905, Chillán, Chile – 30 December 1978, Santiago, Chile) was a Chilean painter and diplomat, known during his lifetime for his nautical paintings, particularly his depictions of the fishing port of Angelmó in Puerto Montt. Pacheco was self-taught, worked largely outside of Chile's academic art establishment and built an independent career as an exhibiting artist, cultural diplomat, and publisher of his own work. He is credited by scholars with having shaped the way southern Chile's coastal landscape entered the national visual imagination.

Pacheco exhibited across thirteen countries, served as the Chilean cultural attaché for France (1952) and later in the United Kingdom (1956), and in 1964 self-financed and produced a monumental illustrated monograph of his life and work, which was published in Spanish, English and French. In 1974, he presented a major retrospective at the Museo Nacional de Bellas Artes in Santiago. He was declared an Honorary Son (Hijo Ilustre) by multiple Chilean cities, and streets, a school, and a fishing cove have been named in his honor.

== Early life and education ==
Arturo Pacheco Altamirano was born on 24 April 1905 in Chillán in Chile's Ñuble province. According to family accounts, his interest in art began with a gift of colored pencils from his aunt, Sister Elisa, with which he drew the houses, trees, and streets of his native region. Pacheco was educated at the Escuela Superior de Hombres N°2 in Chillán Viejo and at the Liceo de Concepción and later enrolled to study architecture at the University of Chile. Following his father's death, he left his formal studies and turned to painting, which he pursued largely as a self-taught artist guided by direct observation of the natural world rather than academic instruction. Pacheco never received formal arts training.

His early architectural training nonetheless left a visible mark on his first paintings, which show close attention to the structure, perspective, and volume of adobe houses, urban corners, and rural landscapes.

In 1924, at the age of nineteen, the historian Enrique Molina Garmendia invited him to exhibit pencil-and-ink drawings as part of the centennial celebrations of the Liceo de Concepción, which was his first public exhibition, and the moment that confirmed his decision to pursue art professionally.

== Career ==
Santiago and the turn to the coast

By 1929 Pacheco Altamirano had settled in Santiago, where he presented an important exhibition and began to establish an independent career built on travel, direct observation, and steady work through the Great Depression years, with his subject matter focused on Chile.

==== The discovery of Angelmó ====
The Southern port-city of Puerto Montt was one of Pacheco's main sources of inspiration. In the early 1930s he travelled to Puerto Montt and encountered the fishing cove of Angelmó, which became the central and defining subject of his work. Rather than observing the harbor from a distance, he is said to have set up his easel directly on the docks in wind and rain, crossed by boat to Tenglo Island, and taken part in the daily life of the cove alongside fishermen, cooks, and merchants. He worked alongside other artists active in the area, among them Manoly, Ledislao Cheney, Hardy Wistuba, and Ricardo Anwandter.

His harbor paintings were executed on durable, coarsely woven canvases able to withstand travel, built up with thick applications of paint using both brush and palette knife.

== International career and diplomatic service ==
His first exhibition outside Chile came in 1935, when he exhibited at the Galería Witcomb in Buenos Aires, Argentina, followed in 1937 by an exhibition at the Galería Entre-Nous in Lima, Peru.

Pacheco Altamirano's work continued to travel internationally through the 1940s and into the 1950s. In 1950 his paintings were shown at the Pan American Union in Washington, D.C. and New York, and in 1951 he exhibited at the Hall of the Americas at the Pan American Union (headquarters of the Organization of American States) in Washington, an exhibition covered by the Spanish-language New York press (El Diario La Prensa) as well as by The Art Digest and the Sunday Star. An exhibition in Philadelphia at the Newman Gallery followed in 1952.

In 1952, Pacheco was appointed the cultural attaché at the Chilean Embassy in Paris. The following year Pacheco became an honorary member of the International Federation of Arts, Sciences and Letters of the United Nations, and the French government acquired one of his works for the Musée d'Art Moderne in Paris. Pacheco was later appointed the cultural attaché at the London Embassy in 1956. In 1972, Pacheco garnered international recognition following a solo show at the Museo de Arte Contemporáneo in Madrid. Over the course of his career he went on to exhibit in Paris, London, Madrid, Istanbul, Ankara, Tokyo, and Mexico City, among other cities; a work is also held by the Museum of Modern Art in New Delhi.

== Artistic style and development ==
Art historian Justo Pastor Mellado situates Pacheco Altamirano's career as a case study in an artist building an independent position outside Chile's academic art institutions, combining a proactive exhibition strategy, sustained press relations, and self-managed sales, at a time when Chilean art training and criticism were centered on the Faculty of Fine Arts at the University of Chile. Mellado also records that Pacheco Altamirano himself distinguished between painting "harbors" and painting "landscapes", describing the harbor as a subject defined by movement rather than by the stability associated with landscape painting.

Stylistically, his work is described as combining thick, dense applications of pigment, built up with a palette knife rather than through traditional glazing or smooth tonal transition, to create genuinely three-dimensional, high-relief paint surfaces on which ambient light casts real shadows. Research on the physical construction of his canvases (supports, priming, and three distinct signature formats used across his career, from upright block capitals in his early period to two later cursive/slanted variants) has been used to support attribution studies of works associated with his estate.

From the 1950s onward, exposure to postwar European art during his Paris and London postings is described as having pushed his painting toward Expressionism and later toward abstraction, while remaining grounded in the same subjects, sea, wind and harbor life, rendered through color and gesture rather than recognizable form. He also worked, with more limited attention, in portraiture. This shift away from the marine realism that had made him famous reportedly puzzled some contemporaries who expected him to continue repeating his best-known seascapes.

== The Pacheco Altamirano Museum-Gallery ==
In the mid-1960s Pacheco Altamirano opened his own combined museum and sales gallery at his home on Camino El Alba in Los Dominicos, Santiago, described by scholars as the first museum in Chile dedicated to a living artist. The space was inaugurated in the presence of President Eduardo Frei Montalva, at which point the artist announced the donation of a fixed number of historical works to the Chilean state, although no documentation has been found confirming that this donation was ever formalized.

After his death in 1978, his widow was unable to sustain the museum, and it was ultimately liquidated; its holdings, along with the identifying stamps used to mark works that had passed through it, later came into the hands of collector Juan Salinas Lyon.

== Recognition and honors ==
Honorary citizenship

Pacheco Altamirano was declared an Honorary Son (Hijo Ilustre) by six Chilean municipalities.

- Chillán
- Puerto Montt
- Punta Arenas
- San Felipe
- San Fernando
- Concepción

Namesakes

- Streets named after him in several Chilean cities.
- A school in Chillán Viejo renamed in his honor.
- A fishing cove (caldera) in San Antonio named after him.

Other honors

- Honorary membership, International Federation of Arts, Sciences, and Letters (affiliated with the United Nations), awarded in connection with his Paris posting.
- Work acquired by the French government for the Musée d'Art Moderne, Paris.
- Nominated for Chile's National Prize of Art following his 1974 retrospective at the Museo Nacional de Bellas Artes.

== Film appearances ==
As a well-known figure, Pacheco Altamirano made brief appearances in two Chilean feature films:

- El burócrata González (1964), directed by Tito Davison
- Ayúdeme usted compadre (1968), directed by Germán Becker

== Publications and catalogues ==
1964 — Arturo Pacheco Altamirano: Vida y Obra (Life and Work). A monumental illustrated monograph tracing his biography and career, published under the auspices of the Editorial de la Universidad de Concepción and issued in Spanish, English, and French editions. Pacheco Altamirano conceived, produced, and financed the book himself. Scholar Justo Pastor Mellado identifies it as unprecedented in Chilean art publishing: no Chilean painter of the period had produced a comparable monograph, and the only earlier institutional model, a series of monographic essays from the University of Chile's Instituto de Extensión de Artes Plásticas (covering artists such as Álvaro Casanova, Carlos Hermosilla, and Pedro Luna), was smaller in scope and did not follow international publishing standards. It would be several years before book-length art monographs became more common in Chile, following the initiative of publisher Roberto Edwards at the end of the 1960s.

1972 — Exhibition catalogue, Museo de Arte Contemporáneo, Madrid. Largely followed the design and perspective of the 1964 monograph; included a critical text by Gil Fillol, art critic and the museum's deputy director.

1974 — Exhibition catalogue, Museo Nacional de Bellas Artes, Santiago. Produced to accompany his major retrospective that year.

2026 — Arturo Pacheco Altamirano: Redescubrir a un maestro. A research-based volume bringing together material and documentary research on works in the APA collection.

== Exhibitions (chronological) ==
The following table draws together Arturo Pacheco Altamirano's exhibition history.

Year	Exhibition/Venue	Location
1929	Oficina de Sorteos de la Universidad de Concepción	Santiago, Chile
1932	Sala Calvo Mackenna	Santiago, Chile
1935	Galería Witcomb	Buenos Aires, Argentina
1937	Galería Entre-Nous	Lima, Peru
1939	Sala Banco de Chile	Santiago, Chile
1943	Sala Banco de Chile	Santiago, Chile
1945	Sala Banco de Chile	Santiago, Chile
1948	Sala Banco de Chile	Santiago, Chile
1950	Sala Banco de Chile	Santiago, Chile
1951	Galería Pan American Union	Washington, USA
1951	Galería Van Diemen-Lilienfeld	New York, USA
1952	Galería Newman	Philadelphia, USA
1952	Sala Banco de Chile	Santiago, Chile
1954	Galería de Arte Fénix	Madrid, Spain
1954	Galería de Arte, Artesanía Española	Bilbao, Spain
1955	Palacio La Alhambra	Santiago, Chile
1956	Palacio La Alhambra	Santiago, Chile
1956	Galería André Weil	Paris, France
1956	Sala Dardo	Madrid, Spain
1957	Galería Alonso	Bilbao, Spain
1957	The Hispanic Council	London, England
1957	Galería Karaburcak	Ankara, Turkey
1960	Sala de Previsión, Banco de Chile	Santiago, Chile
1961	Galerías Excelsior	Mexico City, Mexico
1961	Galerías Tokio Bijutso Garo	Tokyo, Japan
1961	Galería Nacional de Arte Moderno	New Delhi, India
1962	Sala Previsión, Banco de Chile	Santiago, Chile
1968	Salas Angelmó y Elisa Altamirano	Santiago, Chile
1969	Salas Angelmó y Elisa Altamirano	Santiago, Chile
1970	Hotel Vicente Pérez Rosales	Puerto Montt, Chile
1971	Galería Acquavella	Caracas, Venezuela
1972	Museo Español de Arte Contemporáneo	Madrid, Spain
1973	Salas O Primeiro de Janeiro	Lisbon, Portugal
1974	Casa de Arte Mori	Viña del Mar, Chile
1974	Museo Nacional de Bellas Artes	Santiago, Chile
1985	Galería Fundación Nacional de la Cultura	Santiago, Chile
1994	Casino de Viña del Mar	Viña del Mar, Chile
2010	Centro Cultural Municipal de Chillán	Chillán, Chile

== Personal life, death and legacy ==
Pacheco was married to Victoria Ahumada de Pacheco. His only daughter was Ramona, and family accounts describe him as a devoted grandfather who supported and protected her family. Pacheco was a personal friend of Salvador Allende. Politically, Pacheco was an anti-communist.

In Santiago, Pacheco had a home and studio on the Camino El Alba in the district of Las Condes.

He retired to Las Cruces, where he named his seaside home Refugio Elisa in tribute to the aunt whose gift of colored pencils had first set him toward art. He donated twenty works to his native Chillán, now preserved by the Grupo Tanagra.

On 30 December 1978 Pacheco died at a hospital in Santiago, aged 73.
