= MNBA =

MNBA may refer to:

- 2-Methyl-6-nitrobenzoic anhydride, a condensing agent used in chemistry laboratories
- Mongolian National Basketball Association
- Museo Nacional de Bellas Artes (disambiguation), several institutions
- National Basketball Association (NBA), sometimes unofficially referred to as the MNBA in comparison with the WNBA (Women's National Basketball Association)
