= AWSensors =

Spanish research and technology company

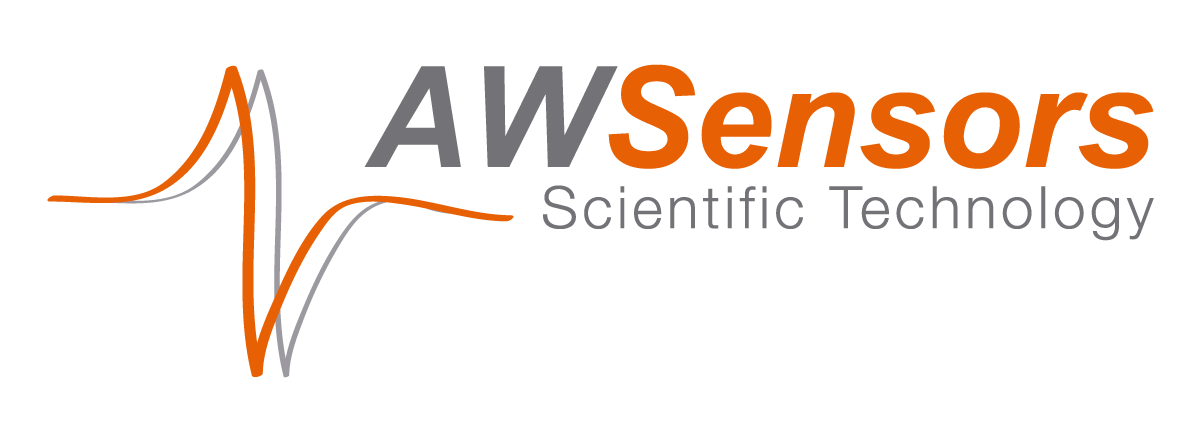
- Type: High technology
- Industry: Electronics
- Founded: 2009
- Founder: Antonio Arnau Vives
- Headquarters: Valencia, Spain
- Products: X4 Advanced Multichannel QCMD, X1 Modular QCMD System.
- Website: https://awsensors.com/

Advanced Wave Sensors (AWSensors) is a Spanish research and high technology company located in Valencia, Spain. The company develops, produces, and offers high-precision electronic detection instruments for basic research, preclinical research, and industrial applications. Created by a team of engineers from the Polytechnic University of Valencia (UPV), its highly sensitive sensors detect and weigh very thin layers of molecules, with a mass of less than nanograms.

== Research and Development ==
After a long research process that began in the 1990s, the company has developed a technology based on quartz crystal microbalances (QCM) exposed to high-frequency electrical currents that are capable of finding molecular interactions in materials, gases, and liquids.

Microbalance monitoring also provides information on viscoelasticity and other structural characteristics of matter at the atomic level. It is thus possible to measure the interactions of molecules on the surface of the sensor and their evolution in contact with elements in gases and liquids. The monitoring, being in real-time, allows immediate results, is easy to process, and at a lower cost than other detection technologies.

The patents derived from this technology have been applied in several processes in the food industry, for dental implants, and in health, highlighting the sensors for the detection of different types of cancer.

In 2015 their research was applied to personalized medicine for the detection of colorectal cancer through blood or saliva samples (liquid biops)). AWSensors coordinated the European project Liqbiopsens (2016-2018) for simple and non-invasive screening, early detection, and periodic monitoring of cancer. This type of analysis is three times less expensive and avoids going through the operating room for a tissue biopsy. The new system is based on DNA localization released by the tumor into the body, making it possible to check the circulating DNA and the mutations associated with cancer with more than 95 percent reliability, and in less than an hour.

The Liqbiopsens project consortium, led by AWSensors and comprising public and private entities, included Destina Genomics Ltd. (UK), the Catholic University of Louvain (Belgium), the Hellas Foundation for Research and Technology (FORTH, Greece), the Andalusian Health Service (Spain) and Sistemas Genómicos SL (Spain). It included experts in oncology, genomics, nanomaterials, microelectronics, and microfluidics.

Between 2017 and 2021, the Valencian company was one of the European CATCH-U-DNA projects for the detection of circulating DNA and pieces from colon and lung cancer tumor cells obtained by liquid biopsy.

In addition to continuing experimental research on quartz crystal sensors in combination with the DNA identification system, AWS provided a sensor array system for rapid preclinical testing of these mutations. Notable future applications include the incorporation of this technology into portable equipment for "on-site" detection and analysis, thus enabling its use at the point of care or in developing countries with limited laboratory infrastructure.

In this project, the team worked in coordination with the Hellas Foundation for Research and Technology (FORTH, Greece), the University of Crete (Greece); the Curie Institute (France); Ben-Gurion University of the Negev (Israel); the German company Jobst Technologies (Germany); and the Autonomous University of Madrid (Spain).

AWS developments for the food industry are used in the search for pollutants such as pesticides and antibiotics in honey production (Instituto de Ingeniería de los Alimentos, UPV). More recently, AINIA (Spain) relied on AWSensors technology to address the identification of Listeria monocytogenes in food products.

Research centers in the United States, Germany, Portugal, France, Greece, Turkey, China, Singapore, Japan, and Colombia, among others, have AWSensors products.

== History ==
The company was created in 2009 by Antonio Arnau Vives, Professor of Electronic Engineering at the Polytechnic University of Valencia, after 25 years of research with quartz crystals. The company emerged as a research extension of the UPV, an institution that is part of its shareholders. The company was created with the idea of commercializing the technological findings of high-frequency sensors and bringing them closer to the scientific community. The company has been commercializing its products since 2012, and its human team is composed of 40% of PhDs, engineers with master's degrees, and specialists in QCM technology.

AWSensors has developed research and innovation activity as the fundamental high-frequency QCM sensors. The company has found the resources to continue advancing in research and innovation through its resources and the involvement in European and national projects, the results of which have been published in scientific journals and patented by the company.

Throughout its trajectory, the company has gained the support of the Valencian entrepreneurial ecosystem, highlighting among others the support of Carlos Navarro, founder of the photovoltaic company Siliken. Since 2020 AWSensors belongs to the QCMTEC group formed by a merger with two other companies, AWSensorsDx (Spain) and QuartzPro (Sweden), to deepen the knowledge of QCM technology and offer products in the field of acoustic technology, to improve the established acoustic and optical technologies for measurements in liquid media. QCMTEC enables technological vertical integration and increased synergy between these companies, bringing together the ongoing efforts of a multidisciplinary group of scientists and engineers with expertise in electronics, materials, surface analysis, sensors, signal processing, biochemistry, and molecular interactions.

== Patents ==
- WO2010149811A1 Method and device for nanogravimetry in fluid media using piezoelectric resonators
- WO2018146348 - Measuring cell
- WO2020053455 - Sensor device
- PCT/ES2021/070518 - Method for characterization of resonant sensor response
- P202130351- Device and procedure for improving the stability and detection limit of acoustic wave sensors (Spain)

== Acknowledgments ==
- In 2011, the IDEAS Institute of the Polytechnic University of Valencia, together with the Bancaja Social Commitment society, awarded the 1st Prize to AWSensors for Research-Based Companies.
- In 2019, it was awarded the Prize for Innovation in Acoustic Technology in the third edition of the Technology and Innovation Awards granted by the newspaper La Razón.
