= Health care in Catalonia =

Healthcare in Catalonia is mainly provided by Catalonia's public health service, the Servei Català de Salut ("Catalan Health Service", CatSalut), run by the Government of Catalonia and part of the Spanish National Health System.

In November 2018, 5,700 medical practitioners, including gynaecologists, paediatricians and general practitioners, went on strike for a week, demanding that the Generalitat de Catalunya implement a cap to the number of daily patient consultations. This was part of a dispute which started in 2008 when more than 900 doctors were fired and doctors’ wages were cut by 30%. They blocked the Gran Via de les Corts Catalanes, and occupied the Catalonia Health Institute headquarters. Emergency services were continued. After 4 days a settlement was negotiated on the number of patient appointments, which were limited by a cap of 25-28 patient consultations per day with a minimum time of 12 minutes per appointment. 300 more primary care professionals were recruited. In February 2019 these guidelines were still not universally enforced according to the doctors’ union of Catalonia, Metges de Catalunya. Very few of the 309 family medical practitioners had appeared. 600 existing doctors had agreed to work more hours. The European Union of General Practitioners found that only about 24% of general practitioners thought the workload in their country was sustainable and reasonable.
