= Timeline of Santander, Spain =

Coordinates: 43.462778°N 3.805°W

The following is a timeline of the history of the city of Santander, Cantabria, Spain.

== Prior to 20th century ==
- 13th C. CE – Santander Cathedral construction begins.
- 1552 – Charles V. landed here to take possession of the Spanish crown.
- 1754 – Roman Catholic Diocese of Santander established.
- 1755 – Made a city.
- 1785 – Consulado (merchant guild) established.
- 1808 – Town sacked by French forces.
- 1839 – Faro de Cabo Mayor (lighthouse) commissioned.
- 1842 – Mercado del Este (market) built.
- 1857
  - Banco Santander (bank) established.
  - Population: 28,907.
- 1868 – Juan Pombo Conejo's recreational "bathing establishment" created.
- 1872 – La Voz Montañesa (Santander) newspaper begins publication.
- 1875 – Tram begins operating.
- 1893 – 3 November: Cabo Machichaco (ship) explodes in harbour.
- 1895 – El Cantábrico newspaper begins publication.
- 1900 – Population: 54,564.

== 20th century ==
- 1902 – El Diario Montañés newspaper begins publication.
- 1908 – Biblioteca Municipal de Santander (library) and Museo de Bellas Artes (Santander) open.
- 1910 – Population: 65,046.
- 1912 – Palacio de la Magdalena built.
- 1913
  - Racing de Santander football club formed.
  - Estadio El Sardinero (stadium) opens.
- 1916 – Gran Casino del Sardinero opens.
- 1926 – Museo de Prehistoria y Arqueología de Cantabria (museum) established.
- 1929 – Marqués de Valdecilla University Hospital founded.
- 1937 – August: Nationalists in power.
- 1940 – Population: 101,793.
- 1941 – Fire.
- 1946 – Manuel González-Mesones becomes mayor.
- 1952 – Festival Internacional de Santander active.
- 1970 – Population: 149,704.
- 1972 – University of Santander established.
- 1975 – CB Cantabria handball team formed.
- 1981 – Museo Marítimo del Cantábrico (museum) opens.
- 1987 – Manuel Huerta becomes mayor.
- 1988 – Campos de Sport de El Sardinero (stadium) opens.
- 1991
  - Palacio de Festivales built.
  - Population: 196,218.
- 1995 – Gonzalo Piñeiro becomes mayor.
- 1997 – Hospital Virtual Valdecilla founded

== 21st century ==
- 2007
  - Íñigo de la Serna becomes mayor.
  - Las Llamas Atlantic Park opens.

== See also ==
- Santander history
- History of Santander (in Spanish)
- List of mayors of Santander (in Spanish)
- History of Cantabria
- List of municipalities in Cantabria

== Bibliography ==
=== in English ===
- "Santander (town)" . Encyclopædia Britannica. Vol. 24 (11th ed.). 1910. pp. 189–190.
- Patrick O'Flanagan (2008). "Santander". Port Cities of Atlantic Iberia, c.1500-1900. Ashgate. ISBN 978-0-7546-6109-2.

=== in Spanish ===
- D. Antonio M. Coll (1891). Guia Consultor e Indicador de Santander y su Provincia (in Spanish).
- D. Rodrigo Amador de los Ríos (1891). Santander (in Spanish). Barcelona: Estab. tip. "Arte y letras". hdl:2027/gri.ark:/13960/t0tq7xv7w.
- Manuel Suárez Cortina [in Spanish] (2000). Santander, hace un siglo [Santander a century ago] (in Spanish). Ed. Universidad de Cantabria. ISBN 978-84-8102-258-2.
