= Miguel de Cervantes Health Care Centre =

- SERMAS Dirección Asistencial Este
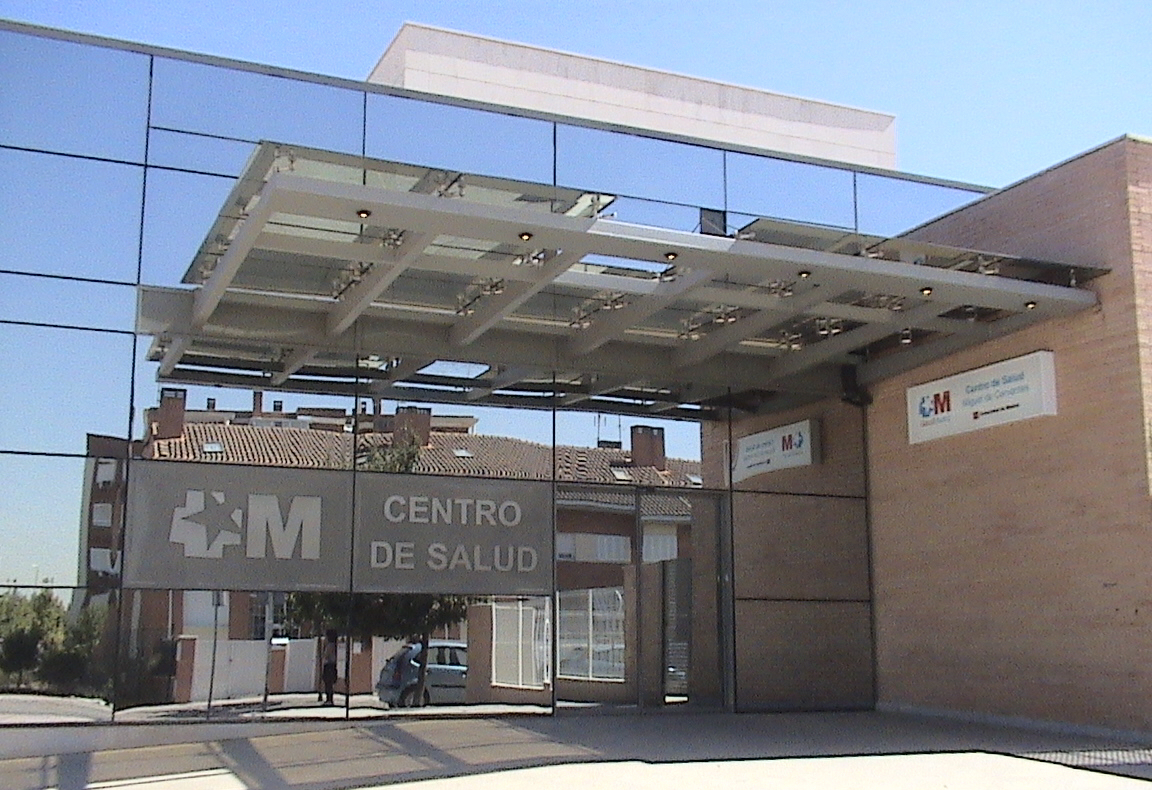
- Main entrance

- Map of Spain

Geography
- Location: Alcalá de Henares, Community of Madrid, Spain
- Coordinates: 40.5112°N 3.3715°W

Organisation
- Care system: Primary Care
- Affiliated university: School of Medicine of the University of Alcalá

History
- Founded: June 26th, 2001

Links
- Website: Miguel de Cervantes H.C.C.

Miguel de Cervantes Health Care Centre (Miguel de Cervantes H.C.C.) is a health centre located at Alcalá de Henares, Madrid, Spain, which belongs to the Health Service of Madrid and is assigned to direct public health care.

== Location ==
It is located at 23 Gustavo Adolfo Bécquer Avenue, Alcalá de Henares (Madrid).

=== Access ===
- From Alcalá de Henares:

- Public local bus Line L3, from Plaza de Cervantes to Espartales.
- Public local bus Line L10, from Vía Complutense to Espartales.

- From Madrid: Intercity bus line 227, at the interchanger from America Avenue (Madrid) to Espartales – University (Alcalá de Henares).

== Characteristics ==
It is a public primary health care centre of the Spanish National Health System which belongs to the Health Service of Madrid and it is located at the east side of Madrid Community. The centre was founded on June 26, 2001, initially in a pre fabricated module but the actual building was inaugurated on November 16, 2006, over 2,600 m2 surface. About 25.000 people divided in several (districts) the Espartales, Ciudad 10, University Campus and the Ensanche integrate the population assigned to the IV District of Alcalá de Henares. Its basic health zone is according with censual municipals Districts D6 and D8.

=== Social-Health Attention ===
The centre offers Primary Care health attention of Family Medicine, Pediatrics, Nursing, Physiotherapy, Midwifery and Odontology; as well as social services with a Social Worker. The professional staff is integrated by 14 Family doctors, 5 Pediatricians, 14 Nurses, 2 Physiotherapist, 2 Matron, 1 Odontologist, 1 Social Worker, 6 Administrative Assistants, 1 Nursery assistant and 1 Odontologist assistant. The attention is from Monday to Friday from 08:00 to 21:00 hours of opening The Centre refers specialist consultations to the Diagnosis and Treatment Integrated Centre Fancisco Diaz and also to the Principe de Asturias University Hospital.

=== Teaching Centre ===
The centre is a teaching centre for practicing and it is connected to:

- The Multiprofessional Teaching Unit of the EAST Familiar and Community Attention to provide education to residents of Family Doctors Specialists
- The University of Alcalá to provide tutelary training to students of Medicine or Nursery
- To the Illustrious Official College of Physicians of Madrid to retrain Family Doctors
- moreover, the centre performs practices of sanitary administrative assistant.

=== Denomination ===
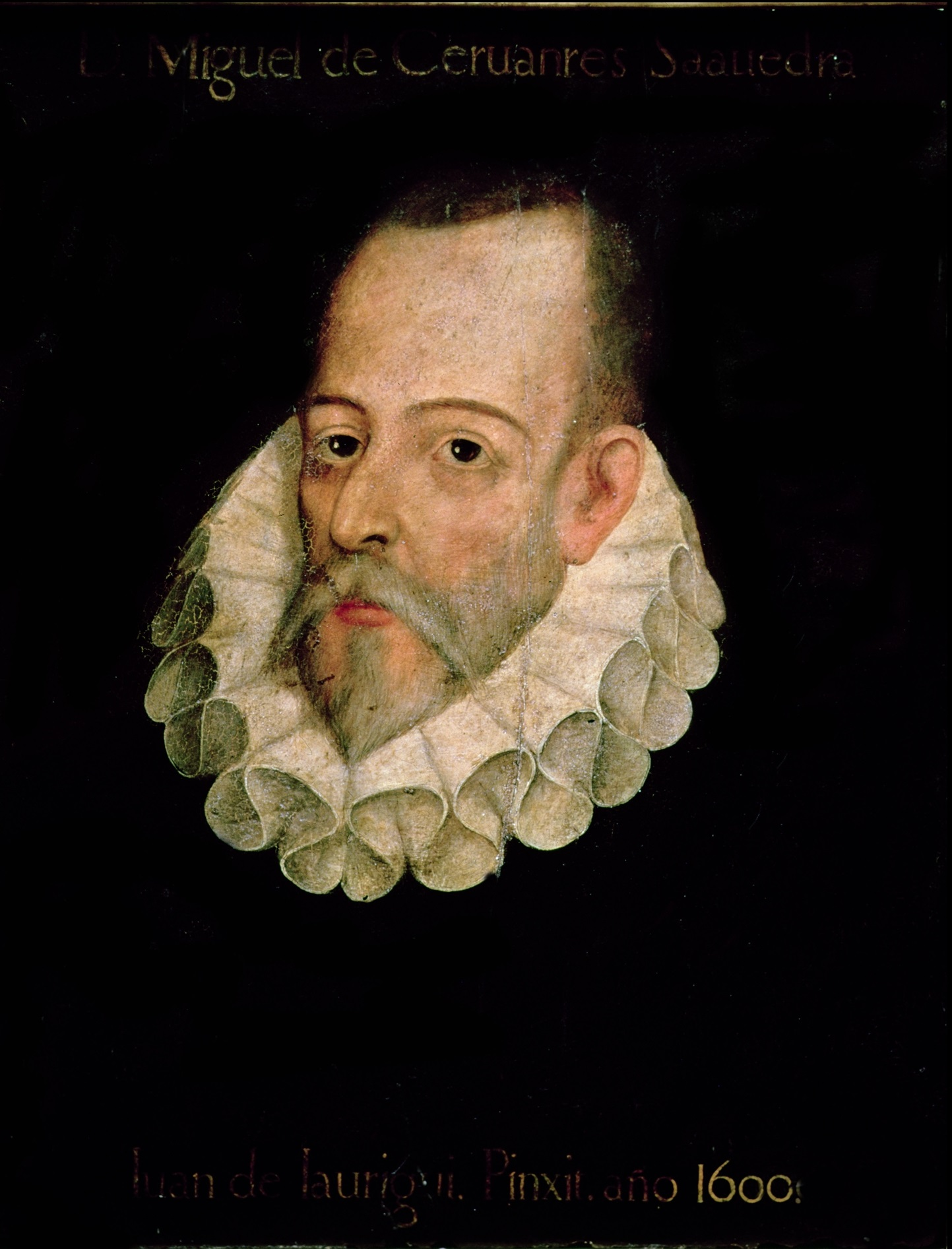
Miguel de Cervantes.

Its name is in memorial of Miguel de Cervantes, a distinguished native and universal writer. Some Cervantes's sentences related with health are listed below:

- “To eat a bit and dinner less, because the whole body health is made in the office of the stomach.”
- “Sorrows were not made for beasts but for men; unless men suffered them a lot and they become beasts.”
- “It is better the pain in the face rather than a spot in the heart.”
- “I will die of old age but I will not fully understand the biped animal called man, because every man is a variety of his species.”
- “Don't walk, Sancho, ungirded and untwisted, because decomposed dress is suggested of a sad mood.”
- “Oh, memory, mortal enemy of my rest!”
- “You would better have a moderate rest, because who does not wake up with the sun does not enjoy the day.”
- “If jealousy are love sings, it is like the cold sore in the sick man, to get it is a sign of being alive but that is a sick live and not willing.”
- “A good contrition is the best medicine for the illness of the soul.”

== See also ==
- Spanish National Health System
