= Hospital virtual Valdecilla =

Healthcare simulation center in Santanter, Cantabria, Spain

Valdecilla virtual Hospital (VvH) is a healthcare simulation center located in the city of Santander, Cantabria, Spain. It was created by a consortium between the Cantabrian Government, the Marqués de Valdecilla University Hospital, and the University of Cantabria.

== Simulation in Healthcare ==
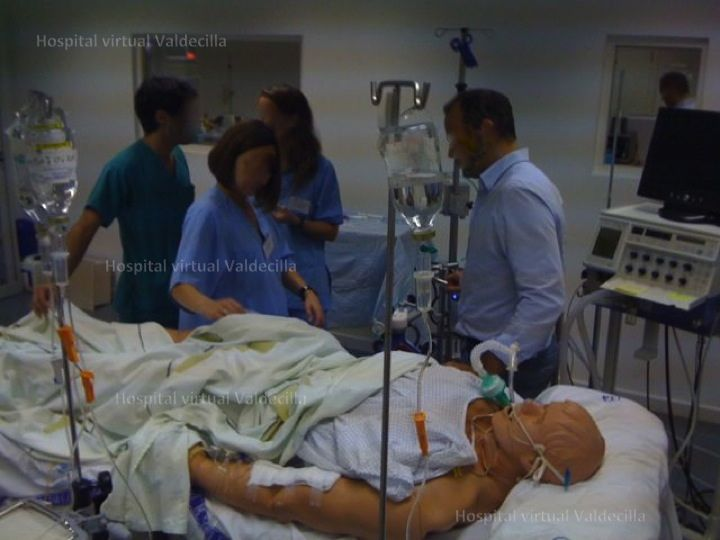
Training healthcare teams with clinical simulation

Clinical simulation is a technique that replaces real situations with guided experiences in realistic environments using simulators instead of patients. Mannequins, actors, part-task trainers, animal and virtual models are used to replicate substantial aspects of the real world in a fully interactive manner, allowing healthcare professionals and students to train with safety. Simulation-based training is followed by a debriefing process that allows trainees to reflect upon their performance as well as to receive feedback. There is increasing evidence that supports the effectiveness of this teaching tool, its transferability to the real world, and its ability to improve patient outcomes. The early efforts of researchers are receiving recognition, and the growth of simulation centers is increasing steadily all over the world. As a result, new professional societies have emerged in recent years, including the Society for Simulation in Healthcare (SSH) (with its own journal), the Society in Europe for Simulation Applied to Medicine (SESAM) and the Spanish Society for Clinical Simulation and Patient Safety (SESSEP).

Today, healthcare and allied health professionals, residents and students are trained to use all applications of clinical simulation. Simulation is currently used to teach technical skills, critical thinking and clinical decision-making, model interprofessional teamwork, and study a broad range of interactions from a single patient–physician encounter.

The concept used in the present article for Virtual Hospital is not the same as the one used in Virtual Hospital (to interconnect villages in the developing world using Telemedicine): a Virtual Hospital in this context is intended to resemble a real one except that the patients are replaced by simulators.

== Important dates for Healthcare Education and Simulation in Cantabria ==
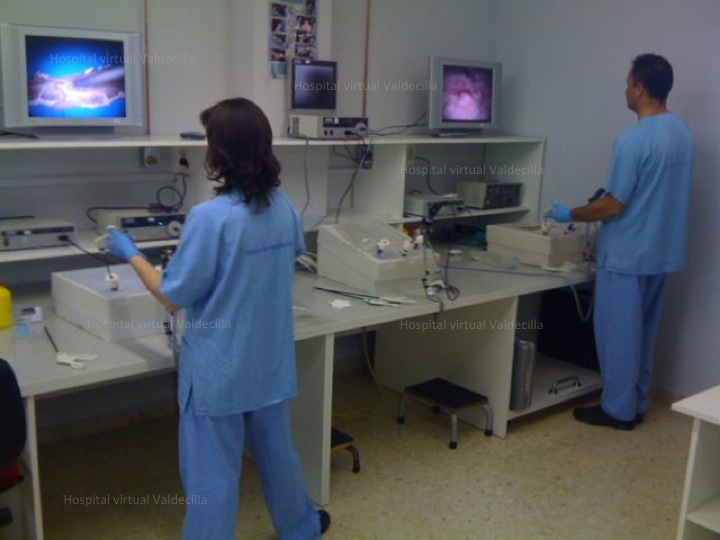
Surgical skills training with simulation

- Foundation of the Valdecilla Health House (1910).
- Foundation of the Marqués de Valdecilla University Hospital, with the important contribution of the Marquess of Valdecilla (1929). It included a nursing school, one of the first ones in Spain.
- Start of the School of Medicine at Cantabria University (1973).
- The Centro de Estudios en Medicina de Urgencia (CEMU) began its activities using standardized patients to train trauma care (1987).
- The Marcelino Botin Foundation donated the first Human Patient Simulator in Spain to Marqués de Valdecilla University Hospital. As a consequence, the Centro de Entrenamiento en Situaciones Críticas (CESC) was founded (1997). This marks also the foundation of the Hospital Virtual.
- The Department of Surgery started off the Centro de formación en cirugía endoscópica (CENDOS) using animal models to learn surgical techniques (2003).
- Marqués de Valdecilla University Hospital signed an agreement of collaboration with the Center for Medical Simulation, Cambridge, MA (2008).
- The University of Cantabria and Hospital virtual Valdecilla signed and agreement to collaborate with the animal-housing service (2011).
- Cantabria's International Campus added Valdecilla virtual Hospital among its associates in order to consolidate its Region of Knowledge project (2011).
- The Research Institute (IDIVAL) and Hospital virtual Valdecilla in collaboration with Marques de Valdecilla University Hospital develop eValtec® (Evaluación de Tecnologías Sanitarias Valdecilla) in 2016.
- Hospital virtual Valdecilla opens a 3D printing lab (2017).
- EValTec® works in partnership with the National Center for Human Factos in Healthcare, Washington (2018).

== Future of Simulation in Healthcare and Allied Health Professions ==
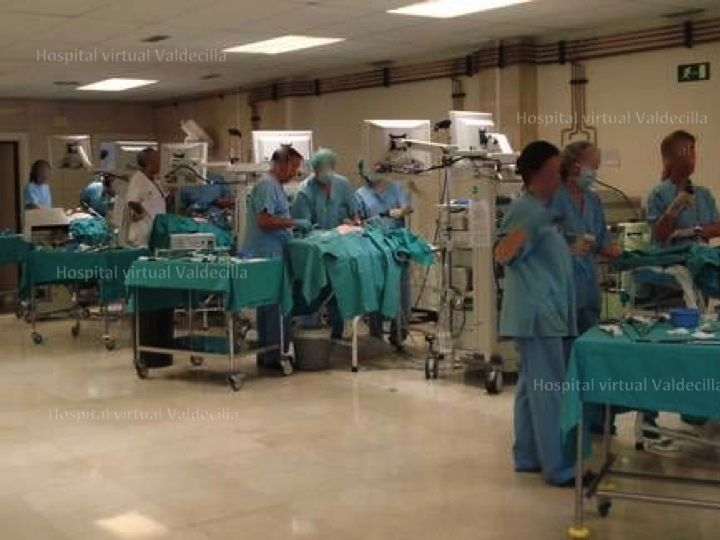
Training laparoscopy with simulation

Simulation for healthcare applications, although still in a relatively nascent stage of development, already has a rich history. Nearly all the original simulators and simulations have evolved into products or concepts that are currently enabling changes in healthcare education and improvements in patient safety.

Current aspects of simulation that need improvement:

- Increased efficiency of Residency training programs.
- Deployment of safe new surgical and clinical techniques.
- Enhanced high-reliability teams in healthcare.
- Improved patient care and better clinical outcomes.
