= Museo de Bellas Artes =

Museo de Bellas Artes (Museum of Fine Arts) may refer to:

== National art museums ==
- Museo Nacional de Bellas Artes (Buenos Aires), Argentina
- Museu Nacional de Belas Artes, Brazil
- Museo Nacional de Bellas Artes (Santiago de Chile), Chile
- Museo Nacional de Bellas Artes de La Habana, Cuba
- Museo de Bellas Artes (Caracas), Venezuela

== Municipal art museums ==
- Bilbao Fine Arts Museum, Spain
- Fine Arts Museum of Córdoba, Spain
- Museo de Bellas Artes (Málaga), Spain
- Museo de Bellas Artes (Santander), Spain, opening in 1908 in Santander
- Museo de Bellas Artes de Sevilla, Spain
- Museo de Bellas Artes de Valencia, Spain

== See also ==
- Palacio de Bellas Artes, Mexico City
- Museum of Fine Arts (disambiguation)
