= Servicio de Salud de Castilla-La Mancha =

Health Service of Castile-La Mancha
- Servicio de Salud de Castilla-La Mancha (sescam)

Health Care Service overview
- Formed: 2000
- Preceding Health Care Service: Instituto Nacional de la Salud (INSALUD)
- Type: Public Provider
- Jurisdiction: Regional Government of Castile-La Mancha
- Headquarters: Calle de los Huérfanos Cristinos 5, Toledo
- Health Care Service executive: Regina Leal, Directora Gerente
- Parent department: Councillery of Health
- Website: sescam

The Health Service of Castile-La Mancha (Spanish: Servicio de Salud de Castilla-La Mancha, sescam) is the public agency responsible for the system of public health services in the autonomous community of Castilla–La Mancha, Spain.

== History ==
The headquarters are located at the Calle de los Huérfanos Cristinos, in Toledo, the regional capital. Legally created in 2000, it was not until two years later, on 1 January 2002, when the SESCAM assumed the services of the INSALUD. Since 2015, Regina Leal serves as managing director of the SESCAM.

The region is divided in 8 health areas: Albacete, La Mancha Centro, Ciudad Real, Cuenca, Guadalajara, Talavera de la Reina, Toledo and Puertollano, with, as of 31 December 2018, a total number of 20 hospitals operated by the SESCAM, 4 additional public hospitals not operated by the SESCAM and 8 private hospitals.
