= Andalusian Health Service =

- Servicio Andaluz de Salud (SAS)
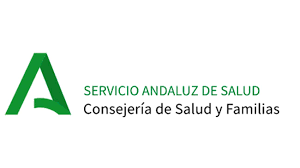
- Official Logo

Health Care Service overview
- Formed: May 6, 1986
- Preceding Health Care Service: Instituto Nacional de la Salud (INSALUD)
- Type: Public Provider
- Jurisdiction: Regional Government of Andalusia
- Employees: 104,198 professionals (2019)
- Annual budget: 10,096,000,000 € (2020)
- Health Care Service executive: Miguel Ángel Guzmán Ruiz, Director Gerente
- Parent department: Councillery of Health
- Website: SAS

The Andalusian Health Service (Spanish: Servicio Andaluz de Salud, SAS), the government-run health system for the autonomous community of Andalusia, Spain, was created on May 6, 1986, as an autonomous agency attached to the Regional Ministry of Health (Consejería de Salud y Familias) of the Andalusian Autonomous Government. The SAS is part of the decentralised Spanish National Health System, and is funded through the annual budget of the Andalusian Autonomous Community. As of 2019, the agency has more than 104,000 employees, including nurses, doctors, pharmacists, veterinarians, social workers, and administrative and service staff. It manages 50 hospitals and more than 1,500 local clinics, covering all medical specialities and applying a wide range of treatments and procedures. The agency also runs emergency rooms, ambulances and medical transport (including aerial transport), physiotherapy, mental health care, etc. Drugs and prescriptions are subsidized, and people pay a percentage of the price depending on its incomes, with a monthly limit for unemployed and retired patients.

== Functions of the SAS ==
Article 13.3 of Decree 241/2004 of 18 May establishes the functions of the SAS:

- Management of health services in the field of promotion and protection of health, prevention of disease, health care and rehabilitation as applicable to the territory of the Autonomous Community of Andalusia
- Administration and management of the institutions, centers and of those health services that are under their dependency, organically and functionally.
- Management of the financial, material and human resources needed to fulfill these functions.

Its functions are further delineated by:

- Ley 2/1998 de Salud de Andalucía (Law 2/1998 on the Health of Andalusia)
- III Plan Andaluz de Salud 2003-2008 (Andalusian Health Plan III).
- The quality plan of the Andalusian Public Health System (SSPA).
- The SAS's own strategic plan.

== Competencies an organization of the SAS ==
Health districts of Andalusia.

=== Primary care ===
Ley 2/1998 establishes a primary health care system for Andalusia. This is the first level of access for the people of Andalusia to the SSPA. Among its characteristic elements is the availability of integrated health services including preventive, curative and rehabilitative care. It is also responsible for the promotion of health, for health-related education, and for monitoring the environment with respect to health.

As of 1 January 2019 there are 1,519 primary care centers in Andalusia, located so that all citizens can readily reach such a center by public transport.

The smallest geographical unit used in organizing primary care services are the districts known as zonas básicas de salud ("basic health zones"). Each zone includes one or more primary care centers, offering health care to the population. A level up from these are districts with the organizational structures to plan, direct, manage and administer these. Most recently (as of 2010) these have been enumerated by 197/2007.

Above and beyond these are Health Management Areas (Áreas de Gestión Sanitaria), established by separate legislation:

- Área de Gestión Sanitaria de Osuna (Province of Sevilla), regulated by Decree 69/1996
- Área de Gestión Sanitaria Norte de Córdoba, Decree 68/1996
- Área de Gestión Sanitaria Campo de Gibraltar, regulated by Order of 2 December 2002
- Área de Gestión Sanitaria Norte de Almería, Order of 5 October 2006
- Área de Gestión Sanitaria Serranía de Málaga, Order of 5 October 2006
- Área de Gestión Sanitaria Norte de Málaga, Order of 5 October 2006
- Área de Gestión Sanitaria Sur de Granada, Order of 5 October 2006

=== Specialized medicine ===
Specialty care is defined under Ley 2/1998 as the second level of care. Specialty care provides the technical and human capabilities appropriate to diagnosis, treatment and rehabilitation for conditions that cannot be handled at the primary level.

In coordination with the primary level, hospitals and their specialty centers form the necessary structure to provide this care. Ésta suele ser programada y urgente, desarrollando además funciones de promoción de la salud, prevención de enfermedades, asistencia curativa y rehabilitación, así como docencia e investigación. This includes both scheduled and urgent care, and, like the primary care, encompasses health promotion, disease prevention, curative care and rehabilitation as well as teaching and research.

=== Hospitals and other centers ===
SAS manages and operates 50 hospitals (2020) throughout Andalusia. In addition they manage and operate numerous more specialized facilities:

- Blood transfusion centers, responsible for the supply of blood and derived blood products to public and private hospitals in Andalusia. The Regional Transfusion Centers also constitute Sectorial Tissue Banks, charged with the study, preparation and conservation of bodily tissues.
- Mental Health Program, a network of mental health centers organized into:
  - District Mental Health Teams
  - Child/Youth Mental Health Units
  - Mental Health Rehabilitation Units
  - Outpatient Mental Health Hospitals
  - Inpatient Mental Health Hospitals
  - Therapeutic Mental Health Communities
- Autonomic Coordination of Transplants
- Urgent and Emergency Care
- User Care Services (Servicios de Atención al Usuario, SAU), in every health center or hospital
