= Marqués de Valdecilla University Hospital =

Coordinates: 43°27′23″N 3°49′47″W

Hospital Universitario Marqués de Valdecilla
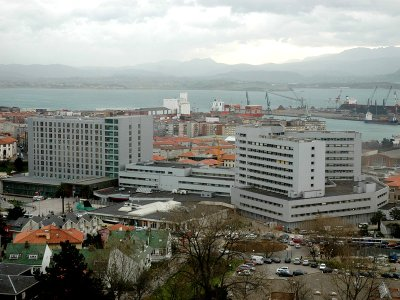

Geography
- Location: Santander, Cantabria, Spain

Organisation
- Affiliated university: Cantabrian Health Service; University of Cantabria

Services
- Beds: 907

History
- Opened: 1929

Links
- Website: http://www.humv.es
- Lists: Hospitals in Spain

The Marqués de Valdecilla University Hospital, mainly known as Valdecilla, is a general hospital located in the city of Santander, Cantabria, in Spain.

== History ==
The Valdecilla Health House was founded by the end of the first third of the 20th century. Three different stages can be set to understand the history of the hospital: the first one, from its foundation in 1929 to 1969; the second one, until 1982; the third one, until 2000; and from that year to the current time.

== Important dates ==
- Foundation of the Valdecilla Health House, around 1910.
- Foundation of the hospital, with the important contribution of the Marquess of Valdecilla (1929). It included a nursing school, one of the first ones in Spain.
- Military hospital, since the Spanish Civil War to the 1950s. It involved a decline in the hospital.
- Inclusion in the National Health System (1969). By the same time, the Maternity Hospital, the children's hospital, the recently built Parayas psychiatric hospital and a geriatric hospital were added. New blocks were built to the General Hospital.
- Creation of the Santander medical school (University of Cantabria), associated to the hospital.
- Second important expansion, by 1982. It was followed by a new decline period.
- In 1997 the Hospital Virtual Valdecilla, a healthcare training center, was founded in collaboration with the University of Cantabria and the Government of Cantabria.
- In 1999, November 2, the older structures were so damaged that the north-eastern wall of the Trauma building collapsed. Four workers died, and many were injured. This accident resulted in the third important renovation, which is expected to conclude by 2012. By the time, Valdecilla is supposed to become a Hospital City, one of the biggest and best equipped in Spain.
