= Negreira =

- Municipality
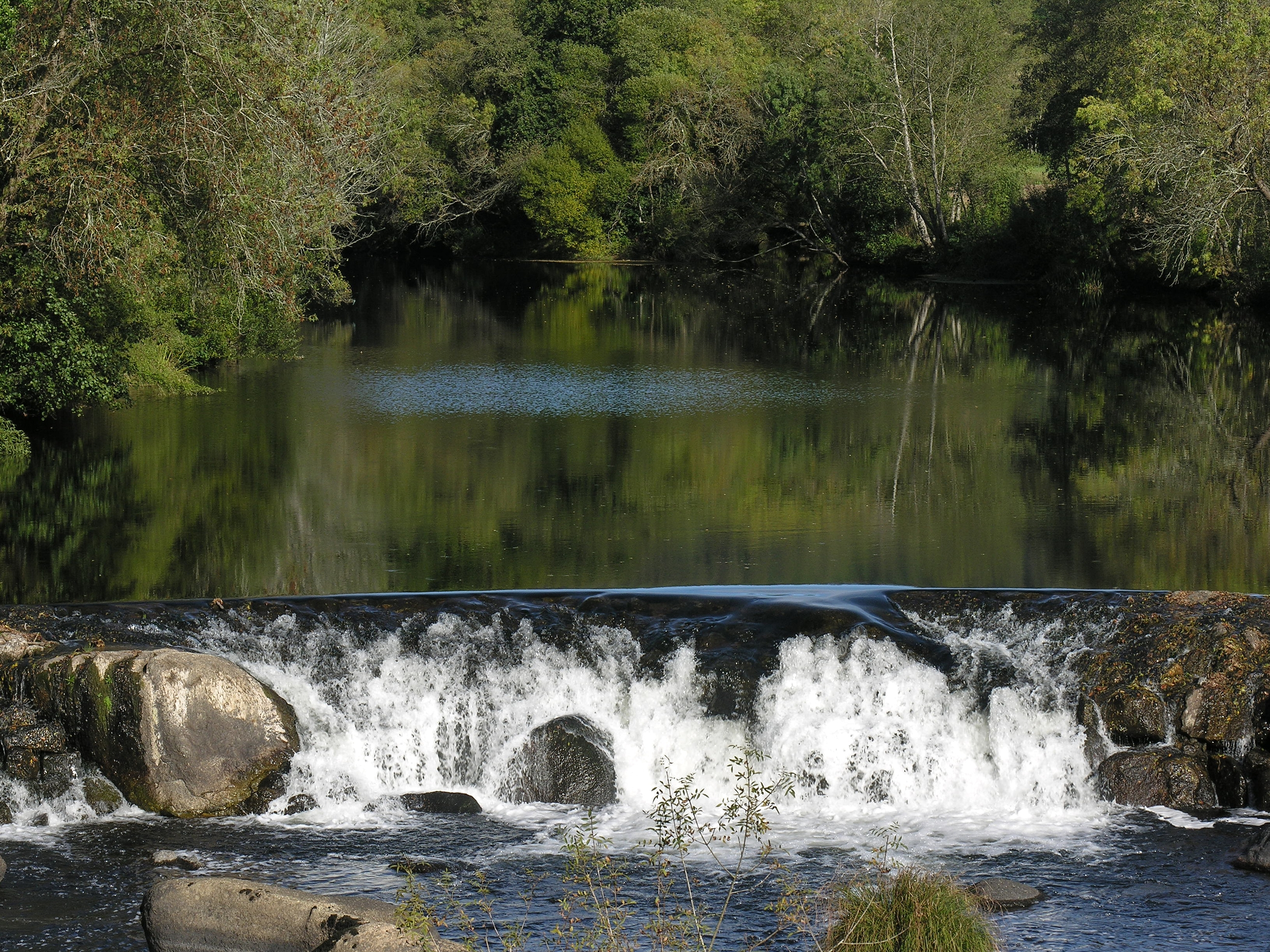

- Coat of arms

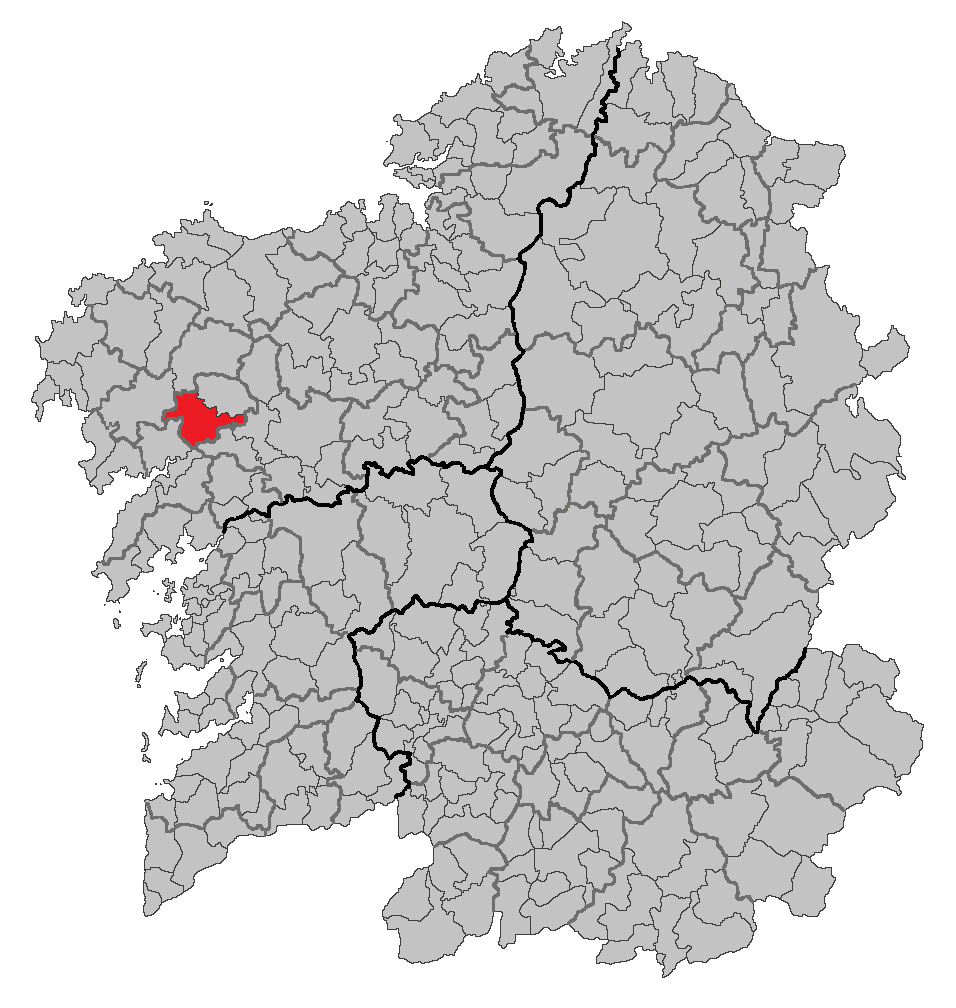

- Location in Spain
- Coordinates: 43°1′N 7°33′W
- Country: Spain
- Autonomous community: Galicia
- Province: A Coruña
- Comarca: A Barcala

Government
  - Alcalde: Juan García Fuentes (Socialists' Party of Galicia)

Area
  - Total: 115.10 km^{2} (44.44 sq mi)

Population (2025-01-01)
  - Total: 6,969
  - Density: 60.55/km^{2} (156.8/sq mi)
- Demonym: Negreirés - Nicrariense
- Time zone: UTC+1 (CET)
  - Summer (DST): UTC+2 (CEST)
- Postal code: 15830
- Dialing code: 981
- Website: Official website

Negreira is a municipality in northwestern Spain in the province of A Coruña, located on the Tambre River, in the autonomous community of Galicia. It is found to the west of Santiago de Compostela. It has a population of 7,074 according to the Spanish National Institute of Statistics in 2011. Its administration also extends to nearby villages, such as Trians. It borders the municipalities of Ames, A Baña, Brión, Outes, Mazaricos, and Santa Comba, in the Province of A Coruña.

== Geography ==
Situated on the banks of the Tambre River, the town of Negreira occupies a strategic position between the ancient per loca marítima road, which from Grandimirum (Brandomil) led to Aquis Celenis (Caldas de Reis), and the Tambre River route, which connects the central regions of Galicia with the coastal areas of Noia. Located in the Barcala River valley, it is now the commercial center of a region that maintains the town with a positive demographic movement.

Moreover, the proximity to Santiago de Compostela and the construction of the Santiago-Noia corridor, which allows travel between Negreira and Santiago in 15 minutes, along with the lower housing prices (much lower than in nearby areas such as Bertamiráns or Brión), have led to continued population growth in the town.

== Demographics ==
It has a population of 7,074 in 2011.

Historical population

Year	Pop.	±%
1842	3,410	—
1857	5,260	+54.3%
1860	5,404	+2.7%
1877	6,143	+13.7%
1887	6,229	+1.4%
1897	6,369	+2.2%
1900	6,406	+0.6%
1910	6,894	+7.6%
1920	7,155	+3.8%
1930	8,163	+14.1%

Year	Pop.	±%
1940	8,923	+9.3%
1950	9,303	+4.3%
1960	10,236	+10.0%
1970	10,021	−2.1%
1981	7,771	−22.5%
1991	6,679	−14.1%
2001	6,592	−1.3%
2011	7,074	+7.3%
2021	6,775	−4.2%

- 1842, 1877–2021: De jure population according to the population censuses of the INE.
- 1857 and 1860: De facto population according to the population censuses of the INE.
In these Censuses it was named Aro: 1842.

== Economy ==
The economy of the area is primarily rural, although in recent years it has shifted towards intensive livestock farming; significant industries are present in the area, such as the agro-food cooperative Feiraco, which markets its products throughout much of Spain. The service sector is almost exclusively centered in the town of Negreira.

== Local Festivals ==
- San Cristóbal: Thursday, Friday, and Saturday of the second week of July.
- Santa Margarita: penultimate Sunday and Monday of September.

== Sports ==
In 2010, the former Nicrariense Sports Association (ADN) merged with Negreira Sports Society (S.D. Negreira) to allow S.D. Negreira to continue in the 3rd division (Galicia) and to clean up the team's finances and promote young players from the subsidiary to the 3rd division so they could gain experience and advance in their sports careers. In 1977, the veterans' football team of Negreira was founded to continue the practice of the sport for those Negreira players who, due to age, stopped playing in federated competitions. In 1980, this team began participating in an international veteran football tournament with the Portuguese team Serzedo, which continues to this day, although since 2002, the event has been organized by the super veterans' team founded that same year. This led to an institutional twinning between the two towns in 1990. In 2007, the Deportivo Cultural Negreira Veterans Association was established, aiming to give new impetus to its activities and diversify the sports offerings among its members.

Regarding futsal, C.D. La Crema was founded in 2005, quickly ascending to the 1st National Division "B", equivalent to the 3rd division. It mainly used players from the Barcalesa and Santiaguesa areas, achieving great performance in a short time. However, the lack of financial support caused the club to enter a very delicate situation on the brink of disappearance starting in 2010, which was eventually finalized in 2013. On the other hand, in 2008, the Negreira Cycling Club was founded to promote cycling in this area, with a large number of members (around 20 young members and 20 adult members). In addition to this, the municipality of Negreira offers a wide range of sports activities, including pre-sport activities, athletics, basketball, handball, contact sports, futsal, karate, multi-sport, tennis, volleyball, maintenance gymnastics, gymnastics for the elderly, and rhythmic gymnastics and artistic gymnastics.

Nature sports are a highlight throughout the area, with various disciplines available. Kayaking along the Tambre River is an activity that allows participants to discover the river's incredible beauty. The Corzán River is equipped with descents for "Canyoning," enjoying its waterfalls, slides, and natural pools. Climbing is possible at equipped artificial locations, just five minutes from the town center in an area of extraordinary beauty, as well as on the borders with the neighboring municipality of Outes at Serpal Rock, a huge granite block shaped like a shark's fin, with eighteen climbing routes ranging from 5 to 35 meters; developed on extraordinary and clean fissures and the characteristic grain of this type of rock. The view from this area over the Muros-Noia estuary is fabulous, reaching as far as Monte Pindo, Santiago de Compostela, and the Tambre River canyon below. It's also possible to practice whitewater kayaking, relaxing hiking, and mountain biking. These activities are included in a guide published in 2003: 40 Adventures at the End of the Road.

== Culture ==
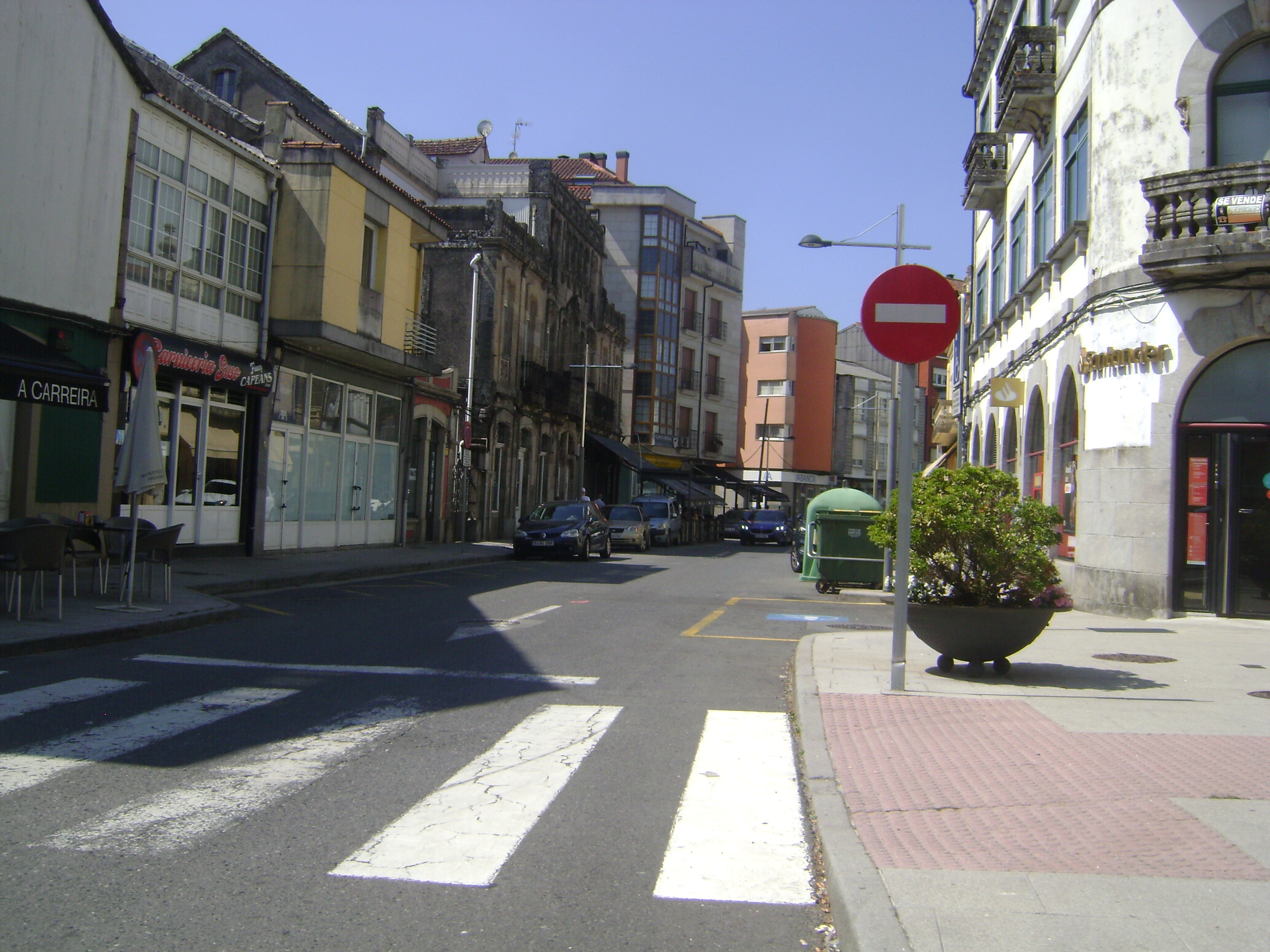
Picture of Negreira.

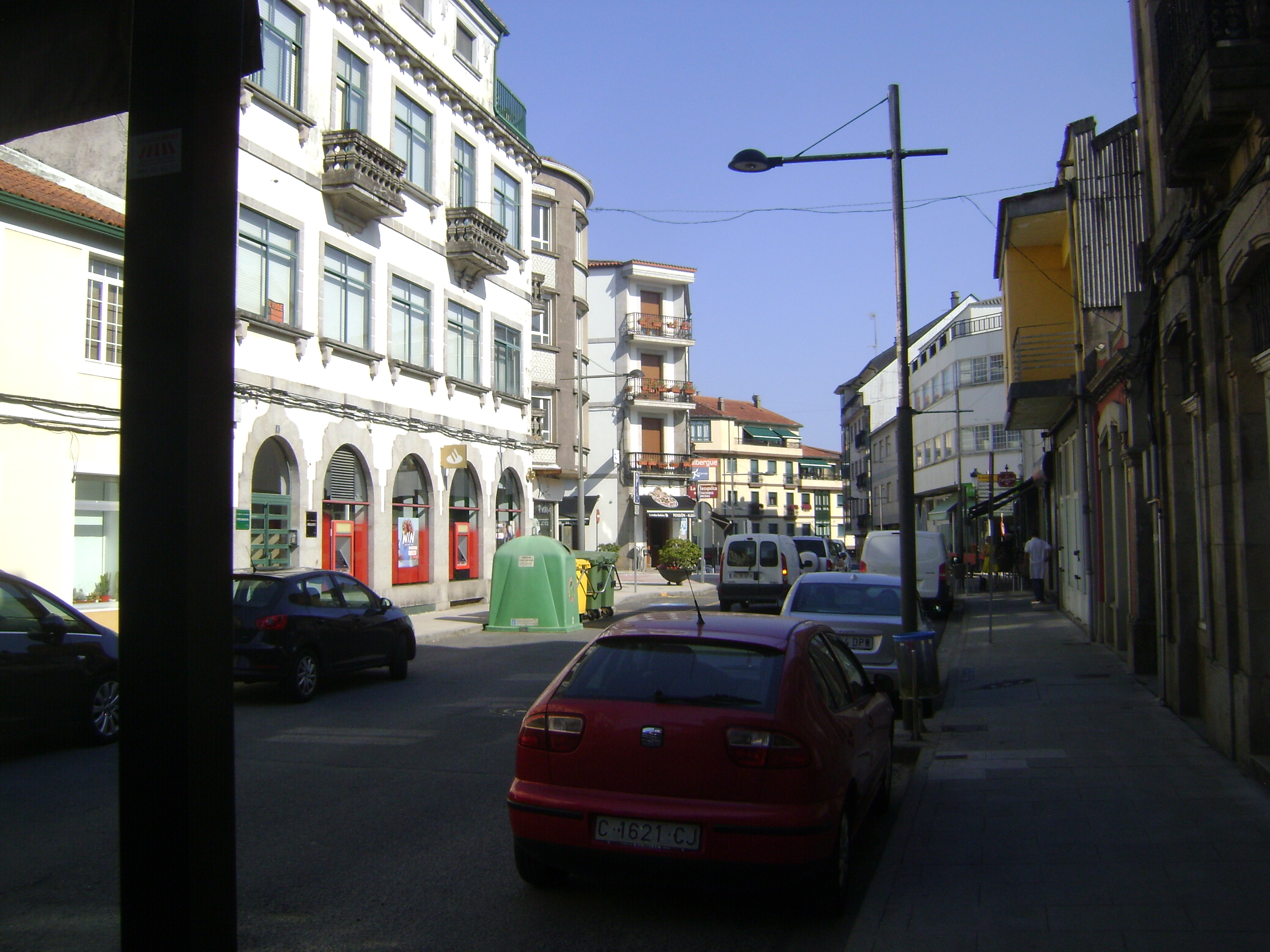
Picture of Negreira.

Negreira is a cultural reference point in terms of music, especially in the field of education, as it has a music school where more than 150 students study each year. This music school has a very wide educational offer, teaching instruments such as flute, clarinet, saxophone, trumpet, trombone, tuba, French horn, percussion, piano, violin, bagpipes, guitar, and accordion. The peculiarity of its school is that it also offers music lessons for adults. In the Christmas and end-of-year recitals, the students of the music school perform what they have learned during the year in the Auditorium of the Sociocultural Center of Negreira, an event that is in high demand among its residents.

The headquarters of the Negreira Music School is the Casa de Cultura of the town itself, where there are classrooms for teaching music theory or musical modalities such as percussion. Enrollment in the school can be done in person at the Library of the Casa de la Cultura or on its website. The Music School has its own band formed by students and former students, the Ateneo de Negreira Music Band. This music band was formed in 1998 under the direction of the then director of the school, Vicente Martín Arastey. From its beginnings, they have performed many concerts: inauguration concert of the new

The cultural richness brought by the Municipal School of Music of Negreira has been highlighted in the formation of musical groups that have seen their beginnings within the walls of this school. Notable groups include Bocinazo Rural Rock and Closer, winners of the Outra + Outra 2016 contest and the Xuventude Crea 2018. Another highlight is the Charanga Mekánika, a reference in the panorama of Galician festivals and similar groups, which has made numerous television appearances both at the regional and national levels.

Negreira hosts two key musical events during the summer: Nicrarock, held in July, and Noitefolk, in August. Additionally, in 2018, Negreira was the venue for the first music festival of the Teen Records label, featuring artists such as Ataque Escampe, The Rapants, Lisdexia, and Treboada Rock.

For the past 13 years, on the last weekend of August, the town of Negreira has hosted the famous Feira do Románico, which, for three days, offers various period-themed activities for all ages, including musical performances that fill the streets with joy and fun. The Feira do Románico is located in the old town area, around the Pazo do Cotón, and offers traditional games for children, food and drink stalls, and a large number of artisan stalls selling clothing and jewelry, among other items. Among the various spectacles at the fair are the falconry exhibition, the pyrotechnic display, and the parade of the theater group "Errantes," which marks the final closing of the 3-day twelfth-century atmosphere.

Located on the Way of St. James, the town has a public shelter for Jacobean pilgrims, and currently, several privately run shelters are opening in the town center.

== Education ==
Negreira has several public education centers that cover all educational levels: Municipal Nursery School, which serves the first cycle of Early Childhood Education in its three levels, between 3 months and 3 years of age. The school can accommodate a maximum of 41 children: 8 up to 1 year old, 13 between 1-2 years old, and 20 from 2-3 years old.

The IES Xulián Magariños High School, where ESO is offered, as well as Bachillerato, Intermediate Vocational Training in Computing, Advanced Vocational Training in Computer Systems Administration, Basic Vocational Training, and, since the 2010–11 school year, it has been a branch of the Official School of Languages of Santiago de Compostela.

== Monuments ==
Notable architectural and natural sites located near the municipal seat of Negreira include several historical landmarks and viewpoints:

- A Ponte Maceira, between the municipalities of Negreira and Ames.
- Pazo do Cotón
- Pazo da Albariña

== Parishes ==
Parishes that are part of the municipality:

- Albite
- Aro (San Vicente)
- Arzón (San Cristobo)
- Broño (San Martiño)
- Bugallido (San Pedro)
- Campelo (San Félix)
- Campolongo (Santa Cruz)
- Cobas (Santa María)
- Gonte (San Pedro)
- Jallas
- Landeira (San Esteban)
- La Pena
- Liñayo
- Logrosa (San Eleuterio)
- Lueiro (Santa Eulalia)
- Portor (Santa María)
- Zas (San Mamede)

== Gallery ==
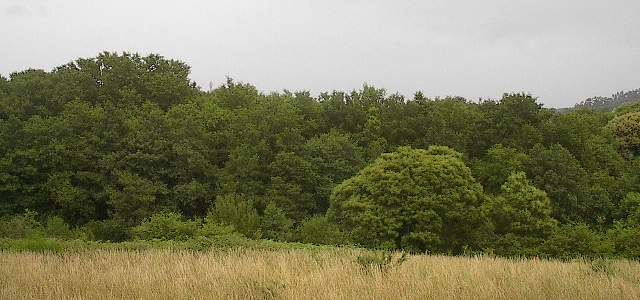
Woods at the edge of Negreira

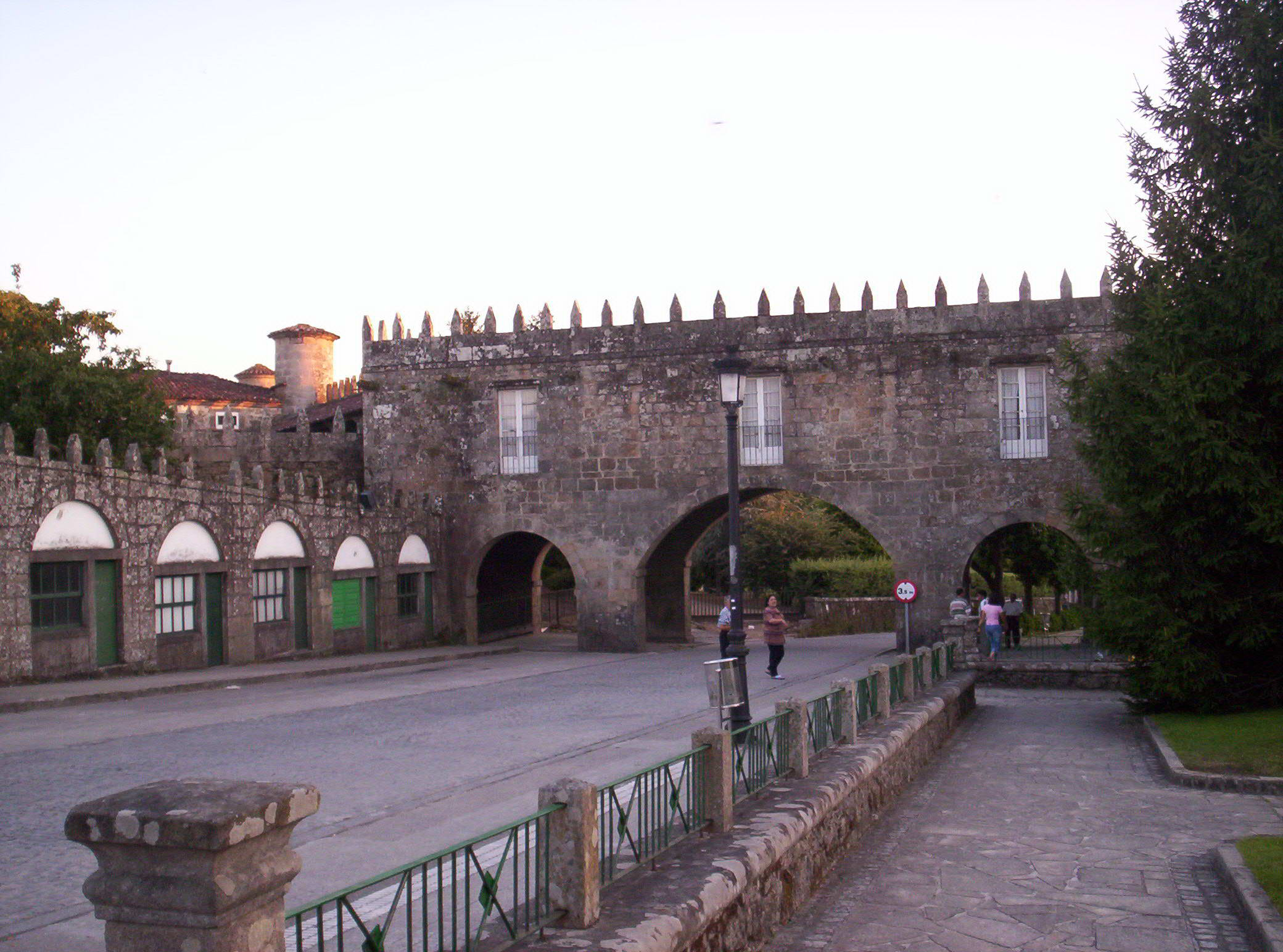
Noble house of Cotón (Pazo do Cotón)

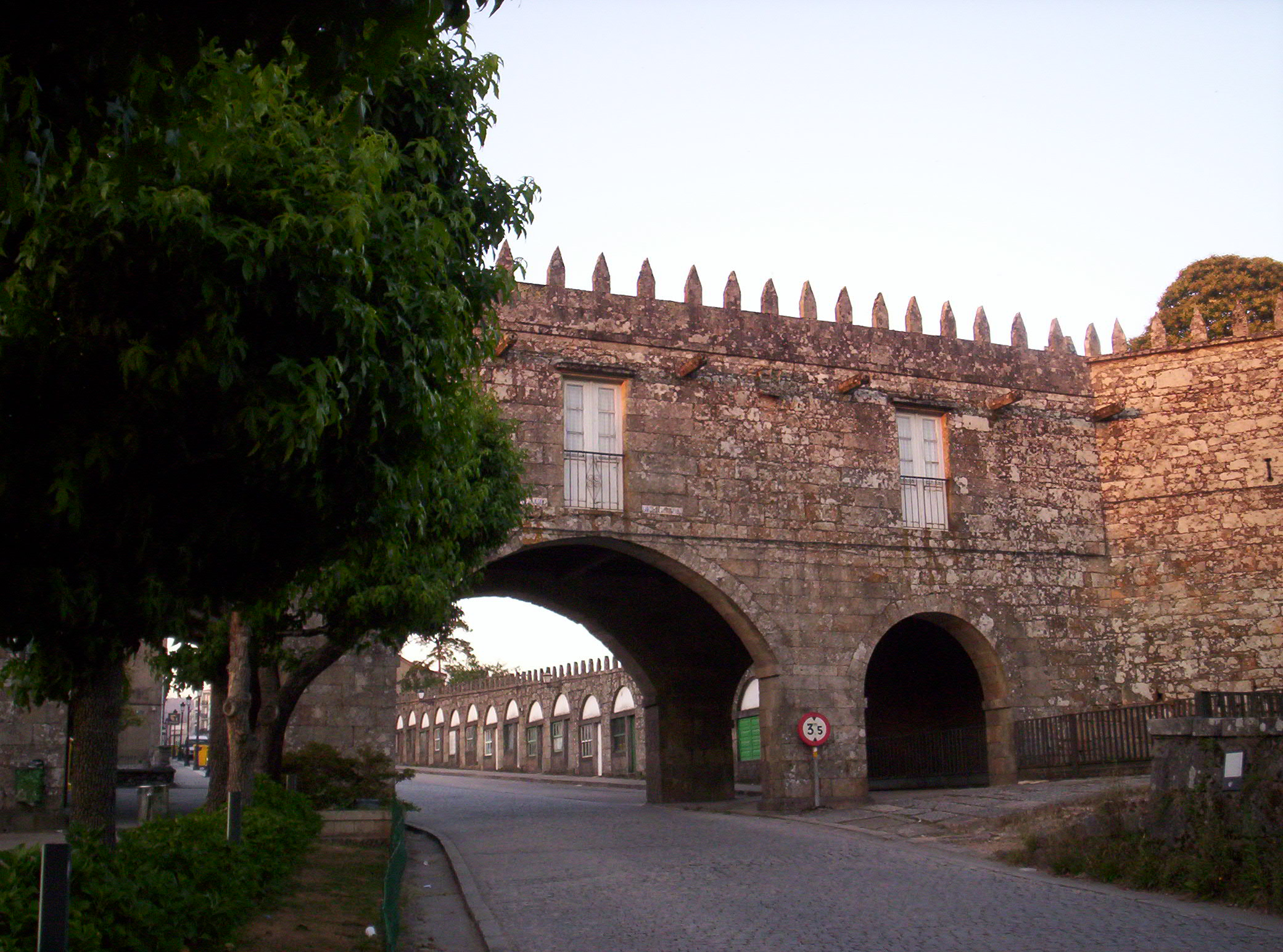
Noble house of Cotón (Pazo do Cotón)

== See also ==
List of municipalities in A Coruña
