= A Ponte Maceira =

- Village
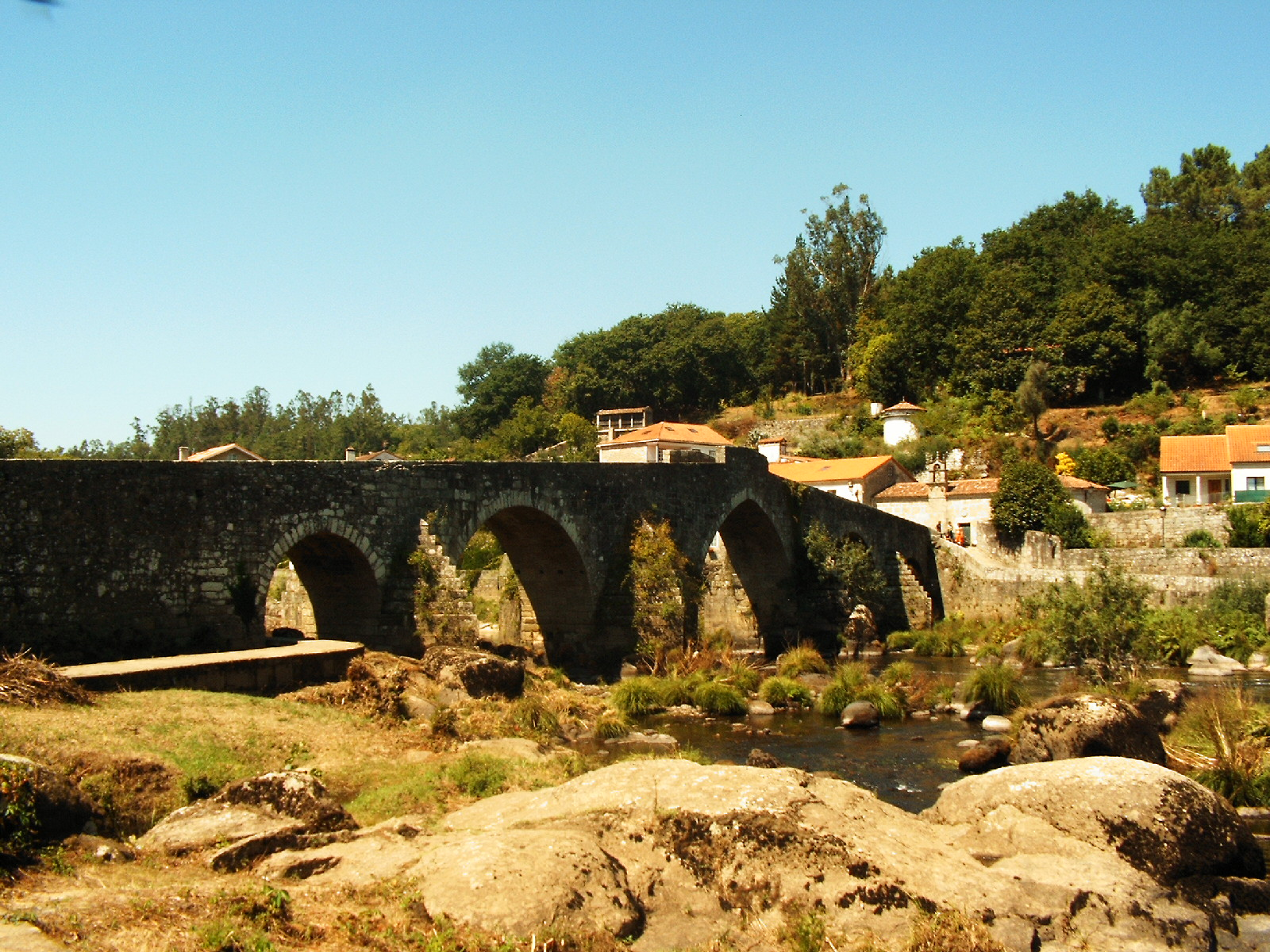
- Pontemaceira

- Location in Spain
- Coordinates: 42°54′20″N 8°41′47″W
- Country: Spain
- Autonomous community: Galicia
- Province: A Coruña
- Comarca: A Barcala
- Municipality: Negreira

Population (2020)
  - Total: 73
- Time zone: UTC+1 (CET)
  - Summer (DST): UTC+2 (CEST)
- Official language(s): Galician and Spanish

A Ponte Maceira (Spanish: Pontemaceira) is a village located in the parish of Portor, in the eastern part of the municipality of Negreira. The village is crossed by the Tambre River. It has a population of 73 inhabitants, 41 men and 32 women.

It has been listed as one of "The Most Beautiful Villages in Spain" since 2019 and has been a member of the namesake association since then.

== Geography ==
In Pontemaceira, located between the municipalities of Ames and Negreira, there is a monumental complex that includes a primitive settlement, an old mill, a dam, a chapel, a modern manor house, and a bridge built over the Tambre in the 13th century. This bridge utilized the pillars of an earlier Roman bridge and features five arches and two smaller ones.

== History ==
The Ponte Maceira bridge was very important on the Maritime Way of St. James, as it connected the city of the Apostle James with Finisterre. There are many legends related to the Way, such as one in which the disciples of the Apostle James fled south to find a place to bury the decapitated body of their master while being pursued by Roman legionaries. The Christians managed to cross the bridge, and when the Romans tried to follow them, the bridge collapsed by "divine" intervention, allowing the Christians to escape.

Here, in the early 12th century, a battle took place between the men of the first Archbishop of Compostela, Diego Gelmírez, and the troops of Pedro Fróilaz de Traba and his sons Fernando Pérez de Traba and Bermudo Pérez de Traba, with whom conflicts on the Tambre River border of the Land of Santiago were common.

== Architecture ==
Notable among the religious architecture is the Romanesque church of Santa María de Portor, one of the most complete in A Barcala. Its façade and tower date from the 17th century. The church is composed of three pairs of half-columns, and inside them, a nave divided into four sections, blind arches, historiated capitals, a side portal, and an apsidal acroterion. The church of Santa María de Portor is still a priory of the "Benedictine" monks, dependent on the San Martín Pinario Monastery in Santiago de Compostela.

The Pontemaceira bridge was built right at the entrance of this village over the Tambre in the 12th century, utilizing the pillars of an earlier Roman bridge. It consists of five main ashlar arches and two relief arches at the approaches. The main arches vary in span, ranging from six to ten meters, with a remarkable pointed vault in the central arch of the bridge. The great stability of the structure during its long years of service is due to the foundation of part of the pillars on the bedrock. Located just 17 kilometers (10.5 miles) from Santiago de Compostela, it is a mandatory stop for pilgrims on the Way of St. James to Finisterre. Like most historical monuments, the Pontemaceira bridge is associated with a fantastic legend.

The small chapel of Saint Blaise was built in the 18th century and later (in the 19th century) a semicircular Neo-Romanesque apse was added.

== Gallery ==
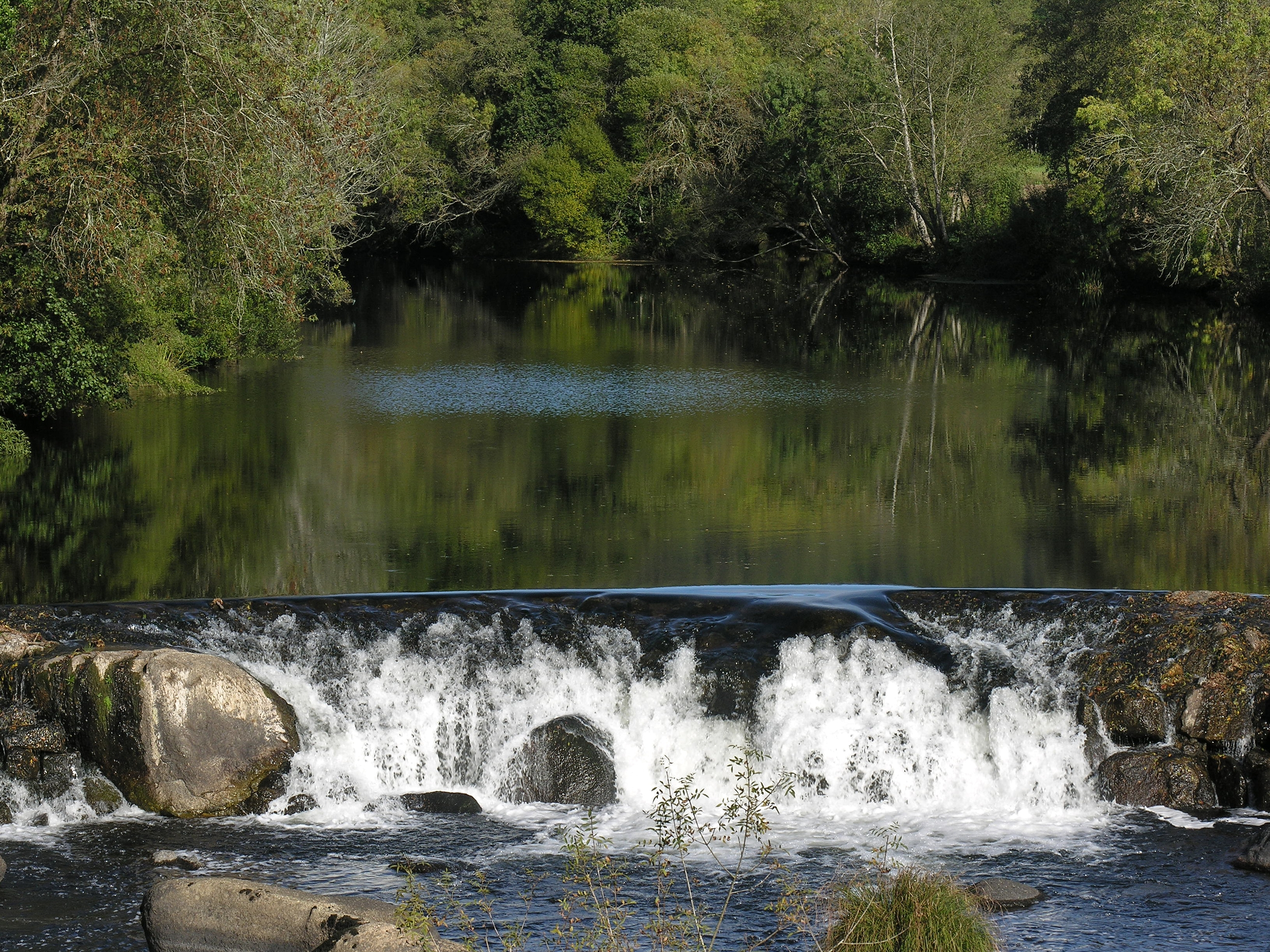
Pontemaceira over the Tambre River.

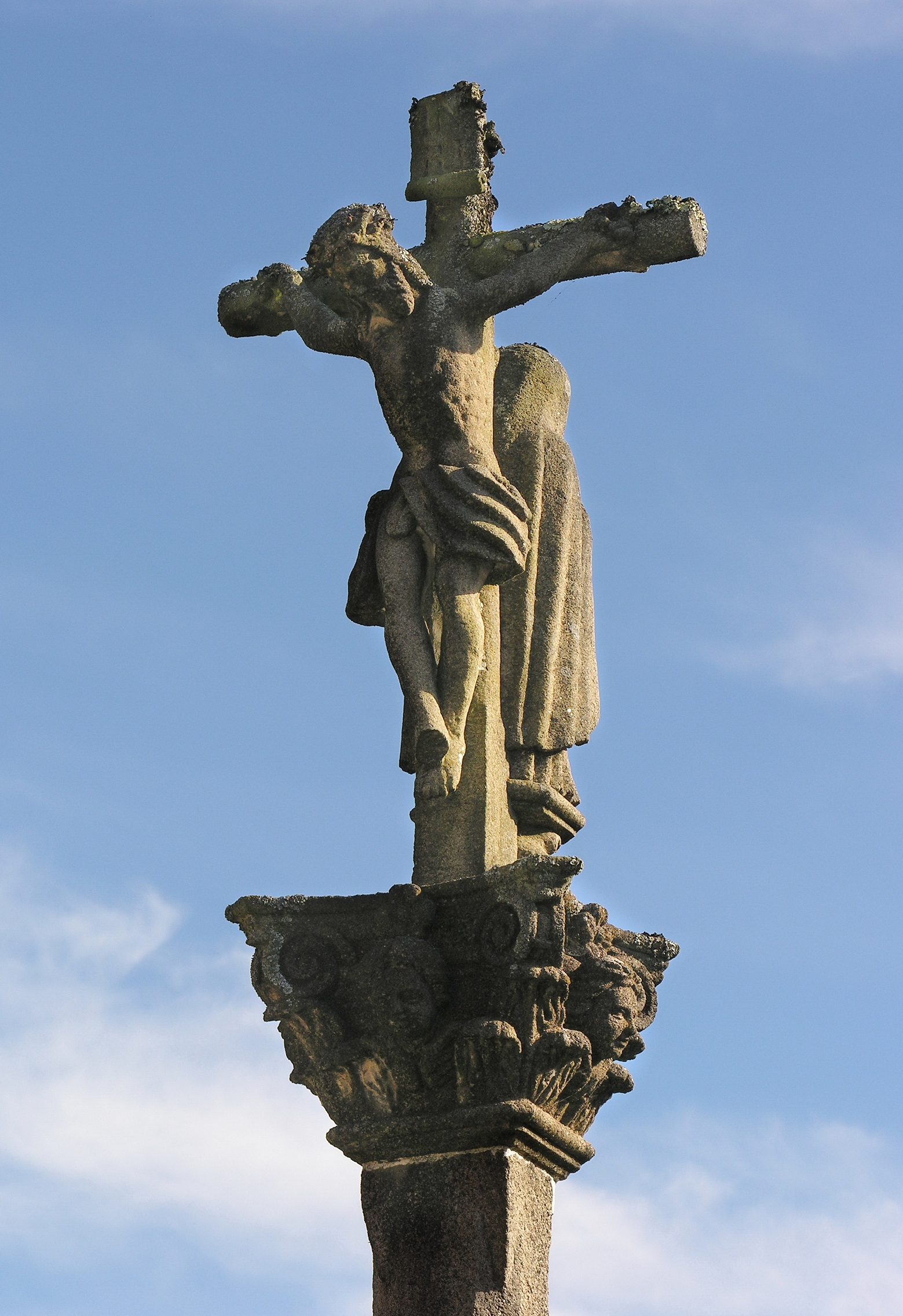
Crucifix.

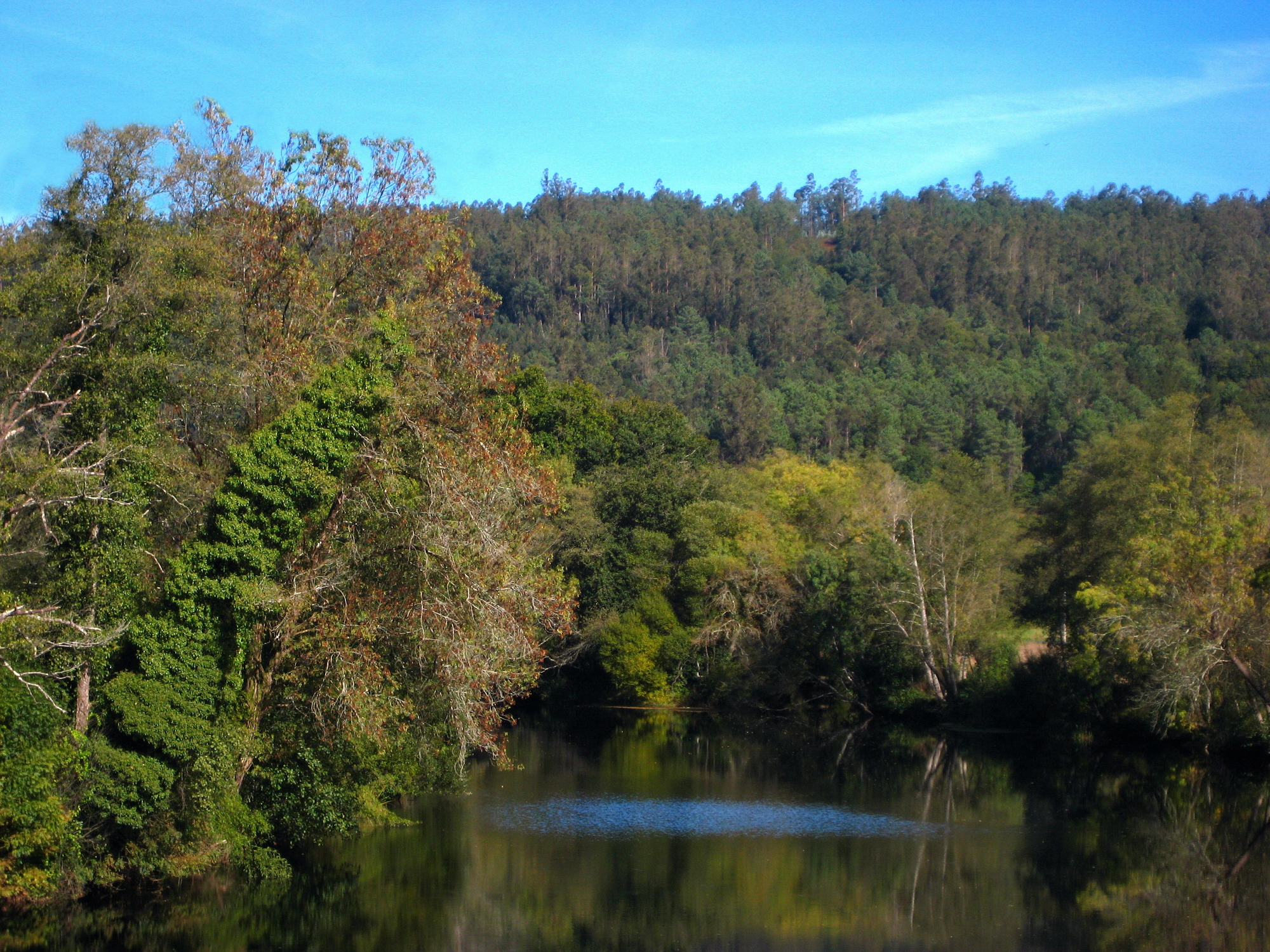
Tambre River.

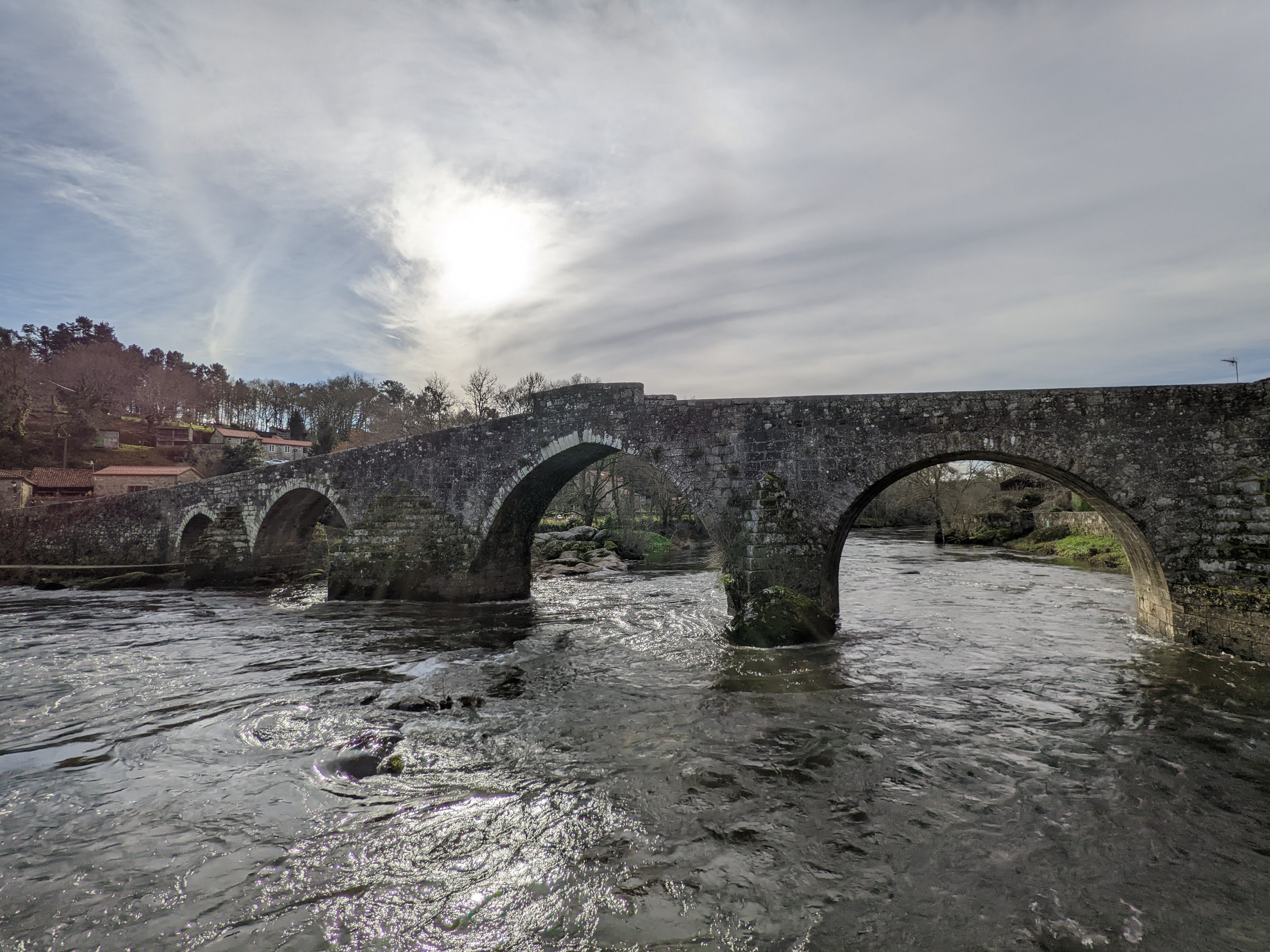
Pontemaceira.
