= Civil Order of Health =

Spanish civil order

Civil Order of Health Orden Civil de Sanidad
- Grand Cross of the Order

Awarded by the King of Spain
- Type: Order of merit
- Established: 17 May 1829; 196 years ago
- Royal house: House of Bourbon-Anjou
- Motto: For health merit
- Eligibility: Spanish and foreign citizens
- Awarded for: Relevant or exceptional merits and services in the field of health
- Status: Extant
- Founder: Ferdinand VII
- Sovereign: King Felipe VI
- Grand Chancellor: Mónica García, Minister of Health
- Chancellor: Under-Secretary of Health
- Grades: Grand-Cross; Commander; Cross
- Post-nominals: OCS

Precedence
- Next (higher): Civil Order of Social Solidarity
- Next (lower): Civil Order of Telecommunications and Information Society
- Grand Cross ribbon

The Civil Order of Health (Spanish: Orden Civil de Sanidad) is a Spanish order of merit awarded to recognize outstanding or exceptional merits, conduct, activities, or services in the field of health care.

It is currently customary for the ceremony of awarding decorations and induction into the Order to take place on April 7, the World Health Day.

== History ==
King Ferdinand VII established the "Cross of Epidemics" by Royal Order of 17 May 1829 to honour the merits of military surgeon Carlos Luis Benoit in the 1817–1824 cholera pandemic that reached Manila in May 1820. Later, this same cross was awarded to other doctors such as Antonio Roig for the Canary Islands epidemic of 1811, Manuel Miciano y Giménez for the Cádiz epidemics of 1819 and 1826, and the senior surgeon of the Military Hospital of Havana, Francisco Alonso y Fernández, for his merits during the cholera pandemic of 1833.

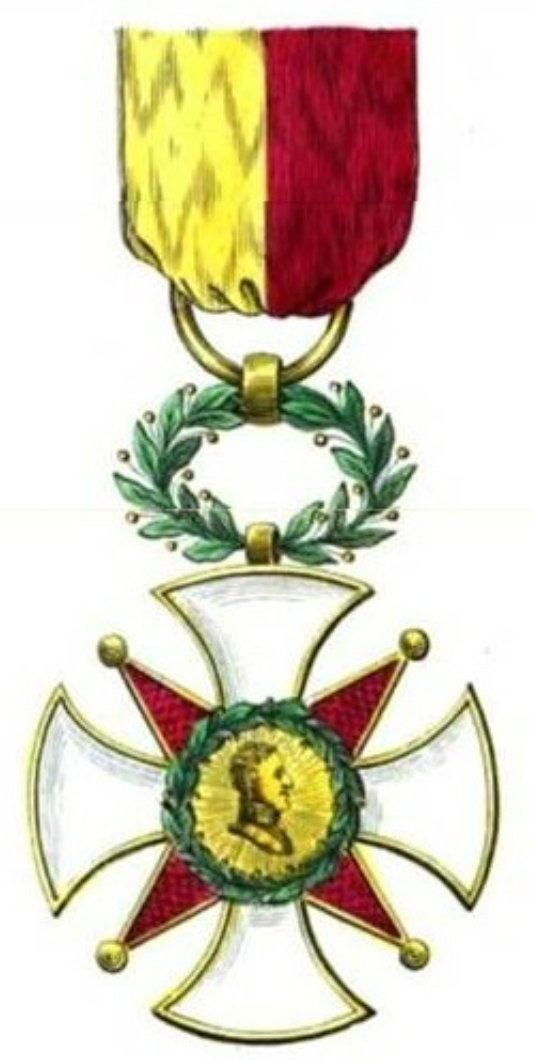
Cross of Epidemics (1838)

Subsequently, the Queen Regent Maria Christina of the Two Sicilies made the cross permanent by Royal Order of 15 August 1838, at the request of the Superior Board of Medicine and Surgery of Spain, to reward the relevant performance of the practice of the health profession. Later, due to a cholera epidemic, the Civil Order of Beneficence was created by Royal Decree of 17 May 1856, to recognize the virtue of exercising charity in non-professional activities. Both decorations were merged by Royal Decree of 29 July 1910, remaining under the name of Civil Order of Beneficence.

This situation caused serious disadvantages, since the two decorations had been created to reward different actions. Given these circumstances, it was decided, by Decree of 27 July 1943, to reinstate the Epidemics Cross under the new name of "Civil Order of Health", separating it from the Civil Order of Beneficence. The new order had three ranks: Grand Cross, Commander, and Cross.

By order of 1 July 1961, the first regulation of the order was created to unify its rules. The number of members in the Grand Cross degree was limited to 100, not including foreign or posthumous members. In addition, a council of the order was established.

Currently, the Civil Health Order is regulated by Royal Decree 1270/1983, of March 30, and the orders of 14 April 1987 and 14 January 1997, which regulate the composition of the Order's Council.

== Current Grades ==
The Civil Order of Health comes in three classes, with the following insignia:

- Grand Cross (Gran Cruz) – Sash and Plaque.
- Commander (Encomienda) – Order's cross on a necklet.
- Cross (Cruz) – Order's cross hanging from a ribbon.

Insignia
Grand Cross	Commander	Cross

== Council of the Order ==
As of 2026, the Order's Council is composed as:

- Sovereign: King Felipe VI.
- Grand Chancellor: Mónica García, Minister of Health
- Chancellor: Ana María Sánchez Hernández, Under-Secretary of Health
- Secretary: Jacobo Fernández Álvarez, Technical Secretary-General of the Ministry of Health
- Four members of the Order, two with the grade of Grand Cross and two with the grade of Commander.

The Grand Chancellor chairs over the meetings of the Council and represents them. Both the Grand Chancellor and the Chancellor are entitled to call meetings of the Council of the Order. The Secretary is responsible for issuing certificates of admission to the Order, maintaining its registration book, and periodically updating its members' files.

== Notable recipients ==
- Carlos Luis Benoit (Cross, 1829)
- Manuel Miciano y Giménez (Cross, 1830)
- Manuel José de Porto (Cross, 1836)
- Francisco Alonso Fernández (Cross, 1837)
- Armando Muñoz Calero (Commander, 1945)
- Agustín Aznar (Grand Cross, 1945)
- Jean Alexandre Barré (Commander with Plaque, 1950)
- Ignacio Barraquer (Grand Cross, 1957)
- Severo Ochoa (Grand Cross, 1977)
- Santiago Grisolía, 1st Marquess of Grisolía (Grand Cross, 1984)
- Sabino Fernández Campo, 1st Count of Latores (Grand Cross, 1989)
- Ernest Lluch (Grand Cross, 2000)†
- Gro Harlem Brundtland (Grand Cross, 2003)
- Lim Hng Kiang (Commander, 2009)
- Roy Calne (Commander, 2009)
- Khaw Boon Wan (Commander, 2009)
- Fernando Simón (Commander, 2015)
- Valentín Fuster, 1st Marquess of Fuster (Grand Cross, 2015)
