= José Miñones =

Spanish politician

The Most Excellent José Miñones
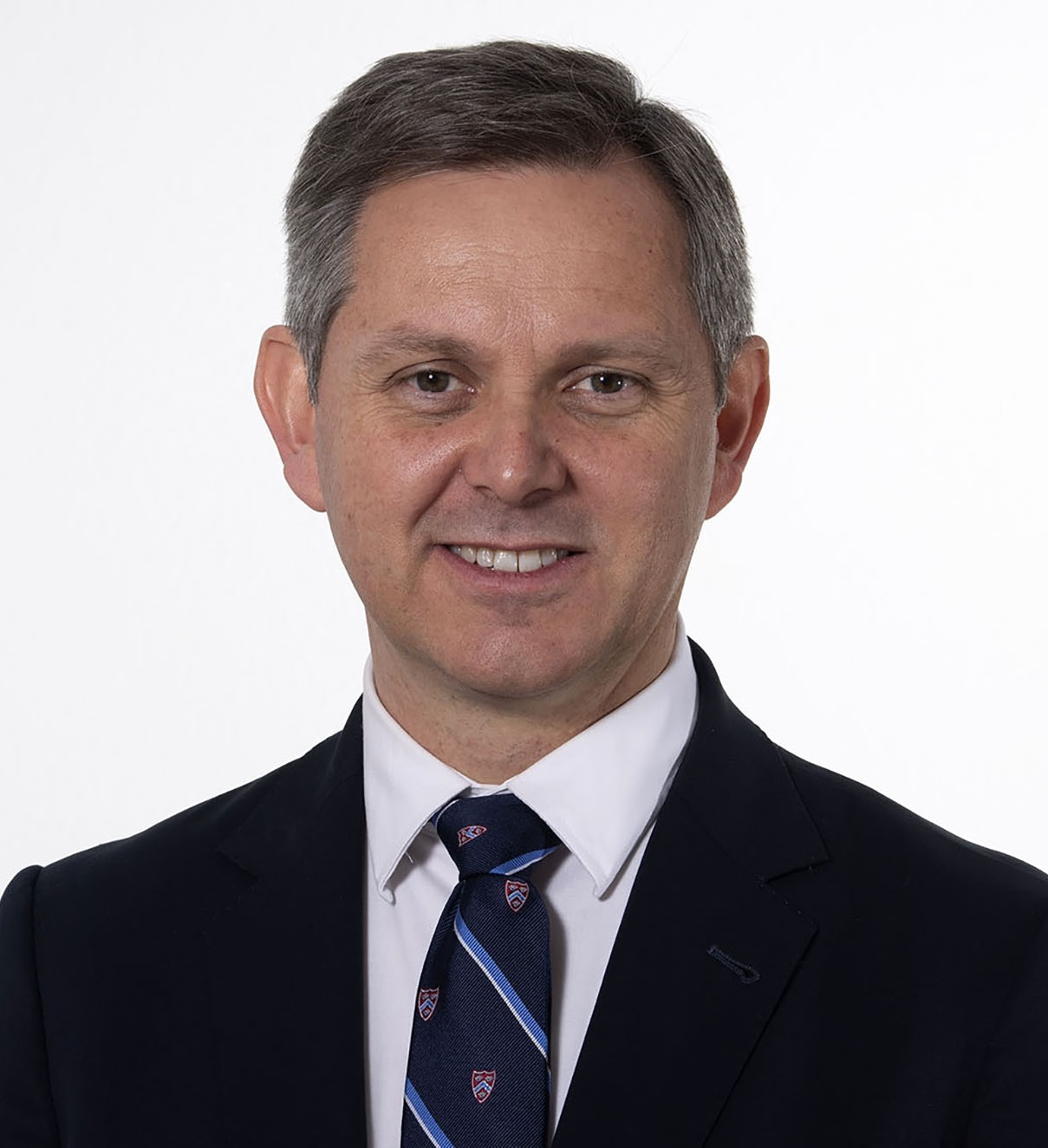
- José Miñones in 2023

Minister of Health of Spain
- In office 28 March 2023 – 21 November 2023
- Monarch: Felipe VI
- Prime Minister: Pedro Sánchez
- Preceded by: Carolina Darias
- Succeeded by: Mónica García

Delegate of the Government in Galicia
- In office 30 March 2021 – 28 March 2023
- Preceded by: Javier Losada de Azpiazu
- Succeeded by: José Ramón Gómez Besteiro

Mayor of Ames
- In office 13 June 2015 – 29 March 2021
- Preceded by: Santiago Amor
- Succeeded by: Blas García

Member of the Ames City Council
- In office 16 June 2007 – 29 March 2021

Member of the Congress of Deputies
- Incumbent
- Assumed office 17 August 2023
- Constituency: A Coruña

Personal details
- Born: José Manuel Miñones Conde; 17 July 1972 (age 54) Santiago de Compostela, Spain
- Party: PSOE
- Education: University of Santiago de Compostela
- Occupation: Politician, university professor

José Manuel Miñones Conde (born 17 July 1972) is a Spanish politician and university professor of the Spanish Socialist Party who served as minister of Health between March and November 2023. Previously, he served as delegate of the Government in the Galicia region from 2021 to 2023.

== Biography ==
Miñones Conde was born in the city of Santiago de Compostela on 17 July 1972 from José Miñones Trillo, doctor of Pharmacy and politician in the area of Galicia and María Mercedes Conde Mouzo.

Like his father, he studied pharmacy at the University of Santiago de Compostela (USC) and graduated in 1997. He received his doctorate cum laude in 2001 with an Extraordinary Mention. He is a professor of Physical Chemistry at the USC School of Pharmacy and a researcher, participating in the Galician Isidro Parga Pondal program.

=== Political career ===
He was elected in the 2007 Spanish local elections as councillor of the municipality of Ames (La Coruña) and during that legislature he was councillor for Administrative Reform, Administration Quality, New Technologies and Health. He was re-elected in the 2011 Spanish local elections and in 2012 he was appointed spokesperson of the Socialist Local Group. Re-elected again in 2015, he was appointed mayor of Ames after an agreement with minor political groups. He was elected for a second term as mayor in 2019.

He resigned in March 2021 after being appointed by prime minister Pedro Sánchez as delegate of the Government in the Galicia region.

==== Health minister ====
On 27 March 2023, the Prime Minister announced his appointment as minister of Health, replacing Carolina Darias, who was leaving the office to focus on the local campaign for the mayorship of Las Palmas de Gran Canaria.
