= List of health ministers of Spain =

Head of the Spanish Ministry of Health

Minister of Health
- Coat of arms of Spain

- Standard used by government officials

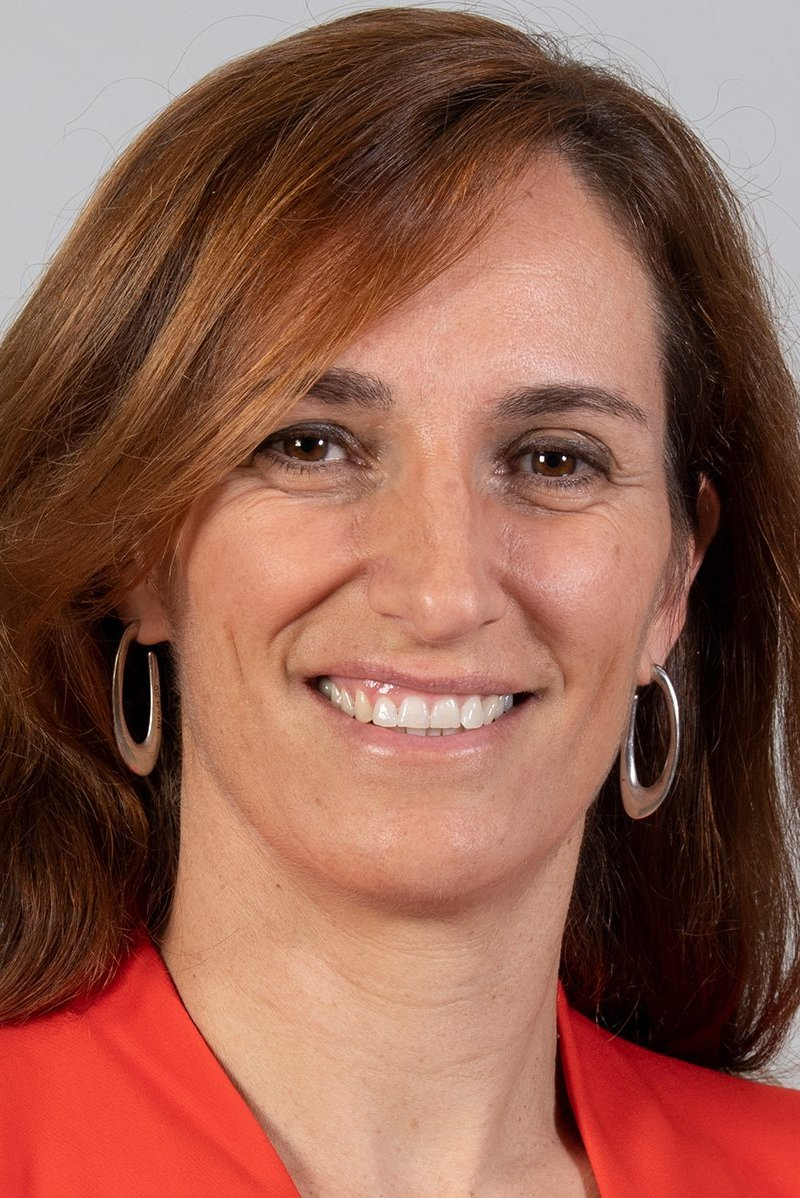
- Incumbent; Mónica García since 21 November 2023
- Ministry of Health
- Style: The Most Excellent (formal); Mr./Ms. Minister (informal)
- Member of: Council of Ministers; National Security Council; NHS Interterritorial Council
- Nominator: The Prime Minister
- Appointer: The Monarch; countersigned by the prime minister
- Term length: No fixed term
- Precursor: Ministry of the Interior
- Formation: November 4, 1936; 89 years ago
- First holder: Federica Montseny
- Website: sanidad.gob.es

The minister of health is a member of the Council of Ministers and the head of the Ministry of Health. The health minister is responsible for designing and implementing the public and private health policy of the central government and coordinating that of the other public administrations.

The minister of health, who is appointed by the Monarch, on the advice of the Prime Minister, is the highest authority in Spain responsible for guaranteeing citizens' right to health protection and coordinates the Spanish National Health System, a system of seventeen regional subsystems and the National Institute of Health Management—for Ceuta an Melilla. This coordination is carried out through the Interterritorial Council of the National Health System.

== Powers ==
In the field of public health, the health minister has four main responsibilities:

1. External health. Under the General Health Law, external health —health control of people and goods at borders—and international health relations and agreements are the exclusive competence of the central government.
2. Pharmaceutical products. The Medicines Law establishes this matter as the exclusive competence of the central government, with the implementation of the legislation generally falling under the competence of the Spanish regions.
3. Basic and general health policy. It is the responsibility of the central government to establish regulations that set the minimum conditions and requirements, pursuing a basic equalization of conditions in the operation of public services.
4. Health coordination. As the main person responsible for the health system, the minister must coordinate the public health administrations, that is, by establishing means and systems of communication that make possible reciprocal information, technical homogeneity in certain aspects and the joint action of the State and regional health authorities in the exercise of their respective powers, in such a way as to achieve the integration of partial acts into the whole of the health system.

== History ==
For much of Spain's history, health and social services were the responsibility of the Minister of the Interior. During the Second Republic, these responsibilities were combined with the Ministry of Labour, until the socialist Francisco Largo Caballero granted them full autonomy in late 1936, appointing Federica Montseny as minister—the first woman in Spain to hold a ministerial post. The department lasted only a few months, as prime minister Juan Negrín transferred Health to the Ministry of Public Instruction. Similarly, during dictatorship of Francisco Franco, there was no Minister of Health, as this role was assumed, as before, by the Minister of the Interior.

With the restoration of democracy, prime minister Adolfo Suárez also reinstated the position of Minister of Health, who was also responsible for Social Security. After a brief interruption in 1981, this position was consolidated around two main areas of responsibility: health and consumer affairs. From 2009 onwards, it absorbed other powers such as those related to social services or equality, responsibilities that it has been losing in recent years until it only retained health powers since 2020.

== Civil Order of Health ==
The Civil Order of Health, originally called the Cross of Epidemics, is the most prestigious public distinction in Spain for healthcare merits. Created in 1829, it is intended to recognize individuals and organizations, both national and international, who have performed outstanding or exceptional service in the field of healthcare.

The Minister of Health is the Grand Chancellor of the Civil Order of Health, who may delegate his powers to the Under-Secretary of Health, who acts as Chancellor of the Order. They are assisted by a Council and a Secretariat—led by the Technical Secretary-General of the Ministry of Health. As grand chancellor, the minister is responsible for convening, representing, and, where appropriate, presiding over the meetings of the council, as well as appointing its members. The minister is also the competent authority to approve, on his or her own initiative, the admission of new members to the Order.

== List of officeholders ==
Office name:

- Ministry of Health and Social Assistance (1936–1937)
- Minister of Health and Social Security (1977–1981)
- Minister of Health and Consumer Affairs (1981–2009)
- Minister of Health and Social Policy (2009–2010)
- Minister of Health, Social Policy and Equality (2010–2011)
- Minister of Health, Social Services and Equality (2011–2018)
- Minister of Health, Consumer Affairs and Social Welfare (2018–2020)
- Minister of Health (2020–present)

Name	Name (Birth–Death)	Term of office			Party	Government		Ref.
Name	Name (Birth–Death)	Took office	Left office	Duration	Party	Government		Ref.
	Federica Montseny (1905–1994)	4 November 1936	17 May 1937	194 days	Independent (CNT)	Francisco; Largo Caballero (1936–1937)	Manuel Azaña (1936–1939)	
Office disestablished during this interval.
	Enrique Sánchez de León (1934–2025)	5 July 1977	6 April 1979	1 year and 275 days	UCD	The Duke of Suárez (1976–1981)	Juan Carlos I (1975–2014)	
	Juan Rovira Tarazona (1930–1990)	6 April 1979	9 September 1980	1 year and 156 days	UCD	The Duke of Suárez (1976–1981)	Juan Carlos I (1975–2014)	
	Alberto Oliart (1928–2021)	9 September 1980	27 February 1981	171 days	Ind. / UCD	The Duke of Suárez (1976–1981)	Juan Carlos I (1975–2014)	
	Jesús Sancho Rof (born 1940)	27 February 1981	7 March 1981	8 days	UCD	The Marquess of Ría de Ribadeo (1981–1982)	Juan Carlos I (1975–2014)	
	Office disestablished during this interval. (Note: The department's competences were transferred to the Ministry of Labour, Health and Social Security in 1981.)					The Marquess of Ría de Ribadeo (1981–1982)	Juan Carlos I (1975–2014)	
	Manuel Núñez Pérez (born 1933)	2 December 1981	3 December 1982	1 year and 1 day	UCD	The Marquess of Ría de Ribadeo (1981–1982)	Juan Carlos I (1975–2014)	
	Ernest Lluch (1937–2000)	3 December 1982	26 July 1986	3 years and 235 days	PSC–PSOE	Felipe González (1982–1996)	Juan Carlos I (1975–2014)	
	Julián García Vargas (1945–2026)	26 July 1986	13 March 1991	4 years and 230 days	PSOE	Felipe González (1982–1996)	Juan Carlos I (1975–2014)	
	Julián García Valverde (born 1946)	13 March 1991	13 January 1992	306 days	PSOE	Felipe González (1982–1996)	Juan Carlos I (1975–2014)	
	José Antonio Griñán (born 1946)	13 January 1992	14 July 1993	1 year and 182 days	PSOE	Felipe González (1982–1996)	Juan Carlos I (1975–2014)	
	Ángeles Amador (born 1949)	14 July 1993	6 May 1996	2 years and 297 days	Independent	Felipe González (1982–1996)	Juan Carlos I (1975–2014)	
	José Manuel Romay Beccaría (born 1934)	6 May 1996	28 April 2000	3 years and 358 days	PP	José María Aznar (1996–2004)	Juan Carlos I (1975–2014)	
	Celia Villalobos (born 1949)	28 April 2000	10 July 2002	2 years and 73 days	PP	José María Aznar (1996–2004)	Juan Carlos I (1975–2014)	
	Ana Pastor (born 1957)	10 July 2002	18 April 2004	1 year and 283 days	PP	José María Aznar (1996–2004)	Juan Carlos I (1975–2014)	
	Elena Salgado (born 1949)	18 April 2004	9 July 2007	3 years and 82 days	Independent	José Luis; Rodríguez Zapatero (2004–2011)	Juan Carlos I (1975–2014)	
	Bernat Soria (born 1951)	9 July 2007	14 April 2008	1 year and 272 days	Independent	José Luis; Rodríguez Zapatero (2004–2011)	Juan Carlos I (1975–2014)	
	Trinidad Jiménez (born 1962)	7 April 2009	21 October 2010	1 year and 197 days	PSOE	José Luis; Rodríguez Zapatero (2004–2011)	Juan Carlos I (1975–2014)	
	Leire Pajín (born 1976)	21 October 2010	22 December 2011	1 year and 62 days	PSOE	José Luis; Rodríguez Zapatero (2004–2011)	Juan Carlos I (1975–2014)	
	Ana Mato (born 1959)	22 December 2011	26 November 2014	2 years and 339 days	PP	Mariano Rajoy (2011–2018)	Juan Carlos I (1975–2014)	
	Ana Mato (born 1959)	22 December 2011	26 November 2014	2 years and 339 days	PP	Mariano Rajoy (2011–2018)	Felipe VI (2014-present)	
	Soraya Sáenz de Santamaría (born 1971) acting minister	26 November 2014	3 December 2014	7 days	PP	Mariano Rajoy (2011–2018)	Felipe VI (2014-present)	
	Alfonso Alonso (born 1967)	3 December 2014	10 August 2016	1 year and 251 days	PP	Mariano Rajoy (2011–2018)	Felipe VI (2014-present)	
	Fátima Báñez (born 1967) acting minister	10 August 2016	4 November 2016	86 days	PP	Mariano Rajoy (2011–2018)	Felipe VI (2014-present)	
	Dolors Montserrat (born 1973)	4 November 2016	7 June 2018	1 year and 215 days	PP	Mariano Rajoy (2011–2018)	Felipe VI (2014-present)	
	Carmen Montón (born 1976)	7 June 2018	11 September 2018	96 days	PSOE	Pedro Sánchez (2018–present)	Felipe VI (2014-present)	
	María Luisa Carcedo (born 1953)	11 September 2018	13 January 2020	1 year and 124 days	PSOE	Pedro Sánchez (2018–present)	Felipe VI (2014-present)	
	Salvador Illa (born 1966)	13 January 2020	27 January 2021	1 year and 14 days	PSC–PSOE	Pedro Sánchez (2018–present)	Felipe VI (2014-present)	
	Carolina Darias (born 1965)	27 January 2021	28 March 2023	2 years and 60 days	PSOE	Pedro Sánchez (2018–present)	Felipe VI (2014-present)	
	José Miñones (born 1972)	28 March 2023	21 November 2023	238 days	PSOE	Pedro Sánchez (2018–present)	Felipe VI (2014-present)	
	Mónica García (born 1974)	21 November 2023	Incumbent	2 years and 334 days	MM	Pedro Sánchez (2018–present)	Felipe VI (2014-present)	
