= Vesia =

Vesia may refer to:

- Vesía, town in A Baña, A Coruña, Spain
- Alex Vesia (born 1996), American baseball player
