= Carolina Darias =

Spanish politician (born 1965)

The Most Excellent Carolina Darias
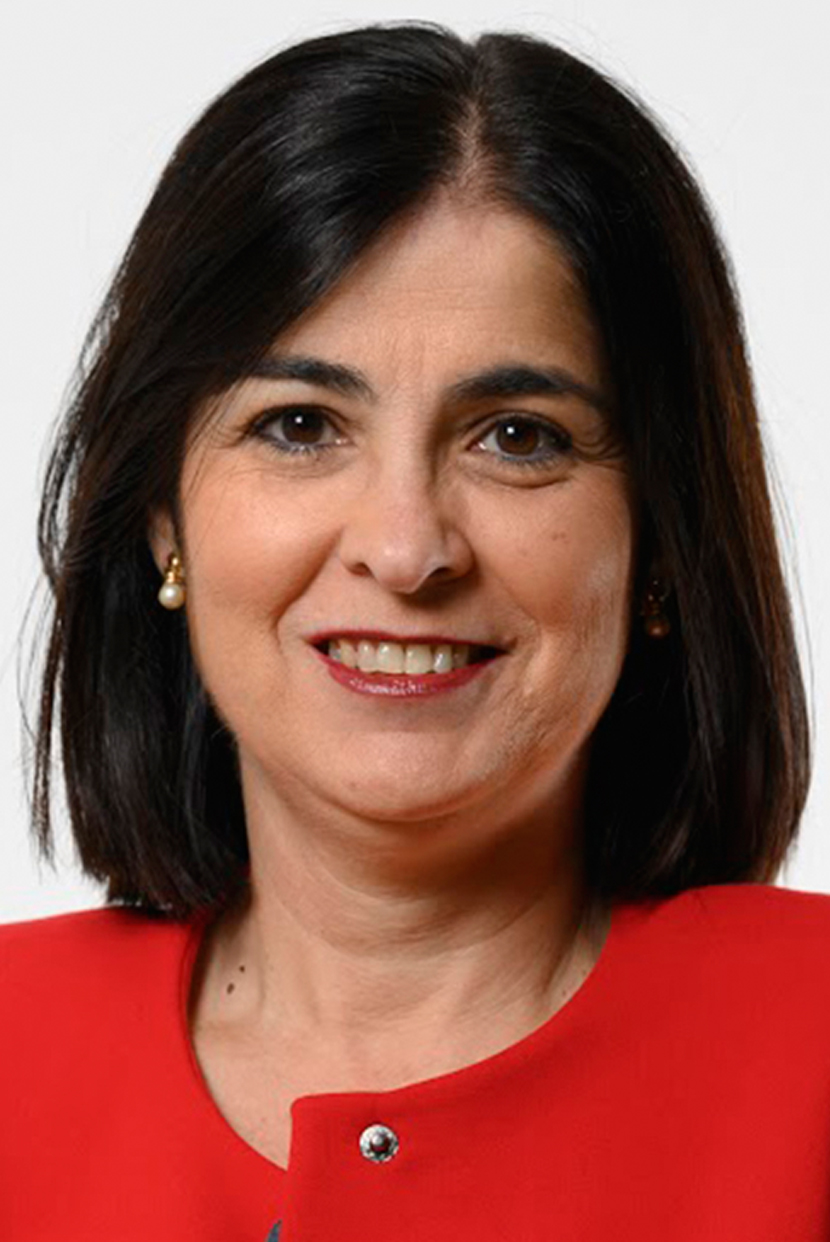

Minister of Health of Spain
- In office 27 January 2021 – 28 March 2023
- Prime Minister: Pedro Sánchez
- Preceded by: Salvador Illa
- Succeeded by: José Miñones

Minister of Territorial Policy and Civil Service of Spain
- In office 13 January 2020 – 27 January 2021
- Prime Minister: Pedro Sánchez
- Preceded by: Luis Planas (Acting)
- Succeeded by: Miquel Iceta

Regional Minister of Economy, Knowledge and Employment of the Canary Islands
- In office 18 July 2019 – 13 January 2020
- President: Ángel Víctor Torres
- Preceded by: Pedro Ortega Rodríguez; Cristina Valido García

President of the Parliament of the Canary Islands
- In office 23 June 2015 – 25 June 2019
- Preceded by: Antonio Castro
- Succeeded by: Gustavo Matos

Personal details
- Born: Carolina Darias San Sebastián; 25 November 1965 (age 60) Las Palmas de Gran Canaria, Spain
- Party: PSOE
- Education: University of La Laguna

Carolina Darias San Sebastián (born 25 November 1965) is a Spanish civil servant and Spanish Socialist Workers' Party (PSOE) politician who served as minister of Health of Spain from 2021 to 2023. Before that, from 2020 to 2021, she served as Minister of Territorial Policy and Civil Service under Prime Minister Pedro Sánchez.

As member of the Spanish Socialist Workers' Party (PSOE), in July 2019 Canarian President Ángel Víctor Torres appointed Darias as regional minister of Economy, Knowledge and Employment in the government of the Canary Islands. She also served as President of the Parliament of the Canary Islands from June 2015 to June 2019.

== Early life ==
Born in Las Palmas on 25 November 1965, Darias received her law degree from the University of La Laguna.

== Career ==
=== Career in regional politics ===
A politician from the Spanish Socialist Workers' Party, Darias was a member of the city council of Las Palmas from 1999 to 2004. She served as a government sub-delegate (2004–07) and was elected to the Parliament of the Canary Islands from Las Palmas in 2007. However, she left the position the following year after her appointment as the director of Territory, Town Planning and Housing in the Las Palmas city council.

In October 2014, Darias contested the PSOE primary for the post of President of the Canary Islands but lost to Patricia Hernández. After the results of 2015 Canarian regional election were announced PSOE agreed to form a coalition with Canarian Coalition and she was elected Speaker of the Parliament of the Canary Islands even though PSOE had won fewer seats than Canarian Coalition. She is the first woman to hold the position.

=== Career in national politics ===
On January 11, 2020, Darias was appointed as Minister of Territorial Policy and Public Function in the Government of Pedro Sánchez was announced.

Throughout the COVID-19 pandemic and as the minister responsible for relations between the central government and the different public administrations, Darias accompanied the minister of health, Salvador Illa, to all meetings of the Interterritorial Council of the National Health System as well as other types of coordination and control meetings in the health field. Due to this, on 26 January 2021 the Prime Minister announced her appointment as Minister of Health, successor to Salvador Illa.

== Personal life ==
On 12 March 2020, it was reported that Darias had been infected by SARS-CoV-2, the virus that caused coronavirus 2020 pandemic. She was the second member of the Spanish government to be infected by the virus, after it was reported that Minister of Equality Irene Montero had tested positive for the virus earlier the same day.
