= Manuela Bergerot =

Spanish politician (born 1976)

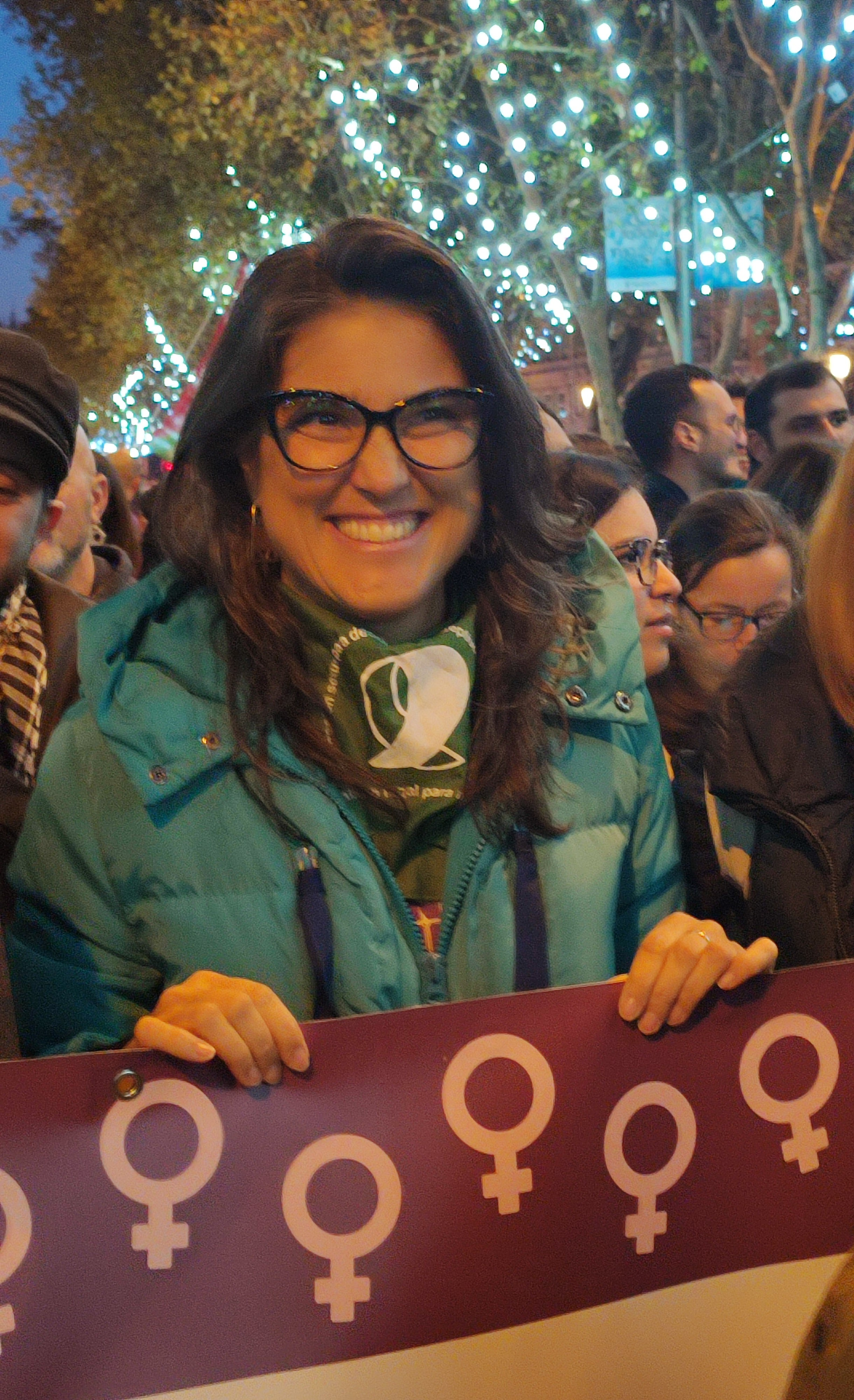

Manuela Bergerot Uncal (born 13 June 1976) is a Spanish politician of the party Más Madrid. She was elected to the Assembly of Madrid in 2021, becoming her party's spokesperson and leader of the opposition in 2023.

== Biography ==
Bergerot was born in La Plata, Argentina. Her father Alfonso was kidnapped by the Argentine military junta shortly before her birth for displaying a banner calling President Jorge Rafael Videla a murderer at an Estudiantes de La Plata football match. After being released, he was forced into exile in Spain. From Spain Alfonso Bergerot managed, with the help of Amnesty International, to get his wife and daughter to join him in Europe when Manuela Bergerot was two years old. Bergerot graduated from the Complutense University of Madrid with a degree in library sciences. She worked on Argentina's legal case against the crimes of Francoist Spain.

Bergerot was a consultant for Podemos in the Assembly of Madrid from 2015 to 2019, before taking on that role for Más Madrid. She was third on the latter party's list in the 2021 Madrilenian regional election, in which it had 34 members elected. She was in the same position in the 2023 election, as it decreased to 27 seats.

In November 2023, Bergerot replaced Mónica García as Más Madrid's spokesperson in the Assembly of Madrid, as García was named Minister of Health in the third government of Pedro Sánchez. This position also made her leader of the opposition to the President of the Community of Madrid, Isabel Díaz Ayuso.

Days after García left for the ministry, she was re-elected leader of Más Madrid, with Bergerot and spokesperson in the City Council of Madrid Rita Maestre as co-spokespersons of the party.
