= San Xoán de Ortoño =

Parroquia in Spain

- Municipality
- Concello de San Xoán de Ortoño
- Interactive map of San Xoán de Ortoño
- Country: Spain
- Autonomous community: Andalusia
- Province: Córdoba
- Comarca: Los Pedroches

Population
  - Total: 6,161
- Demonym: Ortoñian
- Time zone: UTC+1 (CET)
  - Summer (DST): UTC+2 (CEST)

San Xoán de Ortoño (English: Saint John of Ortoño) is a town in the south of the municipality of Ames in Spain.

The town has an historic church.

== Demography ==
It has 6,161 inhabitants (3,171 women and 2,990 men).

== See also ==
- List of municipalities in A Coruña
