= Triáns =

Village in Galicia, Spain

Coordinates: 42°55′21.14519″N 8°44′35.71166″W

Triáns is a small village in the parish of Covas in the municipality of Negreira in the autonomous community of Galicia, Spain.
