= Victoriano Ríos Pérez =

Spanish physician and politician (1930–2018)

Senator
- In office 10 July 1995 – 22 July 2003
- Constituency: Parliament of the Canary Islands

President of the Parliament of the Canary Islands
- In office 15 July 1987 – 27 June 1995
- Preceded by: Pedro Guerrea Cabrera
- Succeeded by: José Miguel Bravo de Laguna Bermúdez

Member of the Parliament of the Canary Islands
- In office 18 June 2003 – 7 September 2004
- In office 15 June 1987 – 8 July 1999

Personal details
- Born: 19 June 1930 San Cristóbal de La Laguna
- Died: 9 January 2018 (aged 87) Tenerife
- Party: Canarian Coalition
- Education: University of La Laguna

Victoriano Ríos Pérez (19 June 1930 – 9 January 2018) was a Spanish physician and politician.

Born on 19 June 1930 in San Cristóbal de La Laguna, he attended the University of La Laguna, where he later taught. Ríos contested the 1986 Canary Islands parliamentary elections, and served until 1999. From 1987 to 1995, Ríos was president of the regional legislature, which nominated Ríos to the Senate later that year. Upon stepping down in 2003, Ríos returned to the Parliament of the Canary Islands until 2004. He died in Tenerife on 9 January 2018, aged 87.
