= List of presidents of the Parliament of the Canary Islands =

President of the Parliament of the Canary Islands
- Presidente del Parlamento de Canarias
- Flag of the Canary Islands

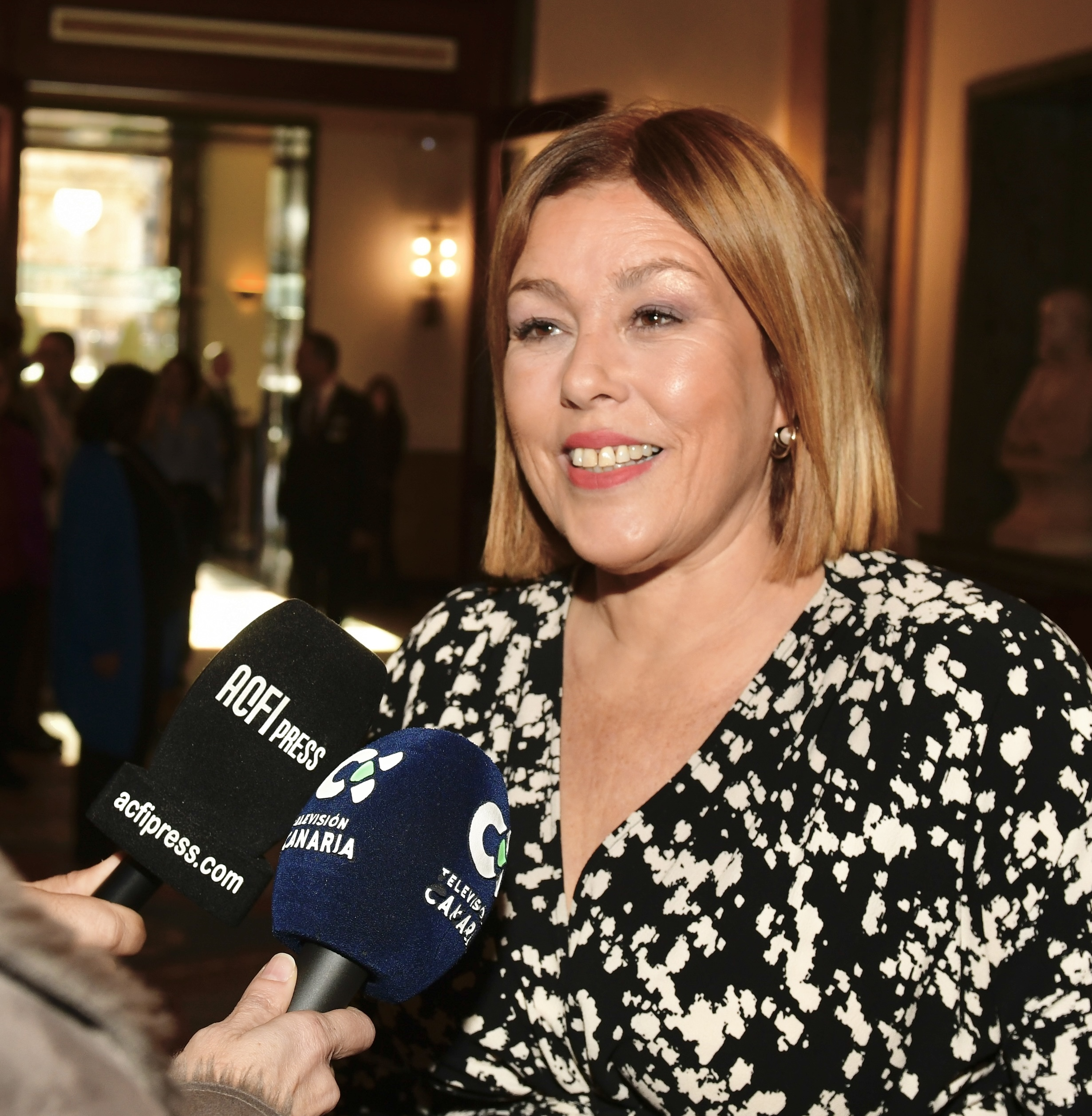
- Incumbent; Astrid Pérez since 27 June 2023
- Member of: Parliament of the Canary Islands
- Formation: 1977
- First holder: Antonio González

This article lists the presidents of the Parliament of the Canary Islands, the regional legislature of the Canary Islands.

== Presidents ==
No.	Name	Portrait	Party	Took office	Left office	^{Legs.}	^{Refs.}
1	Antonio González		Independent	1977	1978		
2	José Mederos		Union of the Democratic Centre	June 1980	June 1981		
3	Pedro Guerra		Socialist Party of the Canaries	1982	30 May 1983		
3	Pedro Guerra		Socialist Party of the Canaries	30 May 1983	14 July 1987	1st	
4	Victoriano Ríos		Canarian Independent Groups	14 July 1987	25 June 1991	2nd	
4	Victoriano Ríos		Canarian Independent Groups	25 June 1991	27 June 1995	3rd	
5	José Bravo de Laguna		People's Party of the Canary Islands	27 June 1995	7 July 1999	4th	
5	José Bravo de Laguna		People's Party of the Canary Islands	7 July 1999	18 June 2003	5th	
6	Gabriel Mator		People's Party of the Canary Islands	18 June 2003	25 June 2007	6th	
7	Antonio Castro		Canarian Coalition	25 June 2007	21 June 2011	7th	
7	Antonio Castro		Canarian Coalition	21 June 2011	23 June 2015	8th	
8	Carolina Darias		Socialist Party of the Canaries	23 June 2015	25 June 2019	9th	
9	Gustavo Matos		Socialist Party of the Canaries	25 June 2019	27 June 2023	10th	
10	Astrid Pérez		People's Party of the Canary Islands	27 June 2023		11th	
