= Mónica García =

Spanish politician (born 1974)

The Most Excellent Mónica García
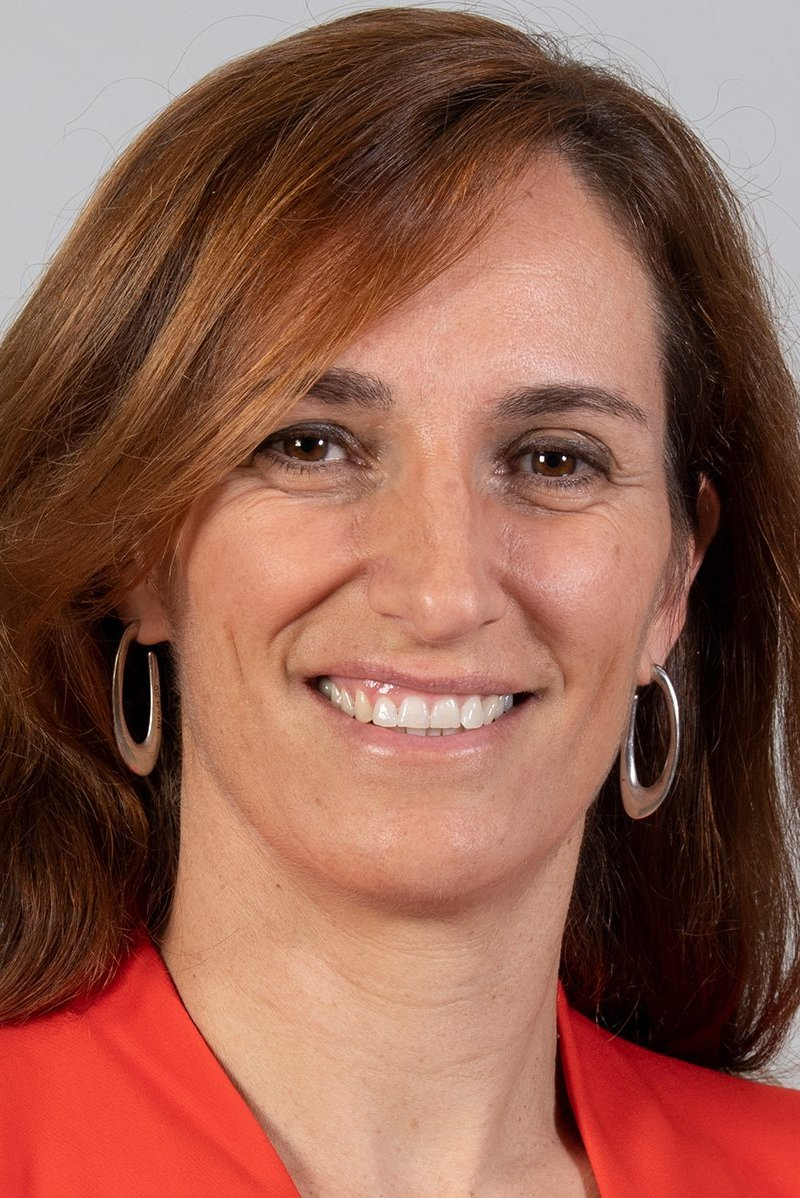
- Official portrait, 2023

Minister of Health
- Incumbent
- Assumed office 21 November 2023
- Monarch: Felipe VI
- Prime Minister: Pedro Sánchez
- Preceded by: José Miñones

Member of the Assembly of Madrid
- In office 9 June 2015 – 20 November 2023

Co-spokesperson of Más Madrid
- Incumbent
- Assumed office 10 July 2020 Serving with Manuela Bergerot and Rita Maestre
- Preceded by: Office created

Personal details
- Born: 16 January 1974 (age 52) Madrid, Spain
- Party: Más Madrid (since 2019)
- Other political affiliations: Podemos (2014–2019)
- Children: 3
- Education: Complutense University of Madrid
- Occupation: Politician; doctor

Mónica García Gómez (pronounced [ˈmonika ɣaɾˈθi.a]; born 16 January 1974) is a Spanish anesthesiologist and politician, currently serving as minister of health since 2023.

She started in politics in Podemos, being elected member of the Assembly of Madrid in the 2015 Madrilenian regional election and combining her political work with her job in health care, with a 50% reduction in working hours. García followed Íñigo Errejón to Más Madrid, being re-elected in the 2019 Madrilenian regional election. A year later she was elected co-spokesperson —one of the party's leaders— of Más Madrid.

In late 2023, she was appointed minister of health in the third government of Pedro Sánchez following the 2023 Spanish general election.

== Biography ==
Born on 16 January 1974 in Madrid, she got a licentiate degree in Medicine and Surgery from the Universidad Complutense de Madrid (UCM), becoming a specialist in anesthesiology; García, who has developed her professional career as an anesthetist at Hospital 12 de Octubre in Madrid, took part as a spokesperson for the Association of Specialists of Madrid (AFEM) in the so-called mareas blancas ("white tides"), protests in defense of public health services.

Included as candidate number 26 on the Podemos list for the 2015 Madrid Assembly election led by José Manuel López, she was elected deputy of the 10th term of the regional legislature, joining the Parliamentary Group of Podemos Community of Madrid. At that time, she narrowly entered the Assembly (26th out of 27 elected legislators of Podemos); she conditioned the assumption of the seat to being able to continue exercising her medical profession part-time. In December 2017, by virtue of a reshuffle of the parliamentary group, García became the president of the parliamentary group replacing Marco Candela. At that time, she also joined the Coordination Council of Podemos Comunidad de Madrid.

Ascribed to the Podemos' faction led by Íñigo Errejón, she joined the latter's list for the Más Madrid primaries in order to draw up the list for the 2019 Madrilenian regional elections in March 2019, and thus she renewed her seat at the May 2019 regional election.

On 10 July 2020, the membership of Más Madrid endorsed Mónica García's list to coordinate the executive board of Más Madrid, with Pablo Gómez Perpinyà and Manuela Bergerot as additional co-coordinators, effectively becoming the visible head of the party in the Assembly of Madrid.

First announced as Más Madrid candidate for the motion of no confidence against regional President Isabel Díaz Ayuso, following the ruling of the Madrid's Higher Court of Justice which rejected both her party's motion of no confidence and that of the PSOE and therefore the validity of the electoral advance after the breakdown of the government of the region, she was announced as the candidate of her party for these elections. She refused to form a pact with Unidas Podemos and its lead candidate, former deputy prime minister Pablo Iglesias, saying "we women are tired of doing the dirty work for them to ask us to step aside at historic moments".

She became the leader of the opposition in the Assembly of Madrid following the 2021 Madrilenian regional elections and the investiture of Isabel Díaz Ayuso as President of the Community of Madrid.

Following the 2023 Spanish elections, in which Más Madrid took part under the umbrella of the Sumar platform, she was appointed Minister of Health under the third Sánchez government.

== COVID-19 pandemic ==
As a doctor, she was on the frontlines during the COVID-19 pandemic in Spain, working at her hospital treating coronavirus patients in the intensive care unit. She has increasingly sparred with the region during her second term. She asked the central government to intervene in Madrid in October following the new rise of cases, and her interventions in the Madrid Assembly received much media coverage for her scathing criticisms of the regional government.

== Personal life ==
García is married and has three children. She is an atheist.

== Electoral history ==
Electoral history of Mónica García
Election	List	Constituency	List position	Result
Madrilenian regional election, May 2015	Podemos	Madrid	26th (out of 129)	Elected
Madrilenian regional election, May 2019	Más Madrid	Madrid	10th (out of 132)	Elected
Madrilenian regional election, May 2021	Más Madrid	Madrid	1st (out of 136)	Elected
