= Manuel Núñez Pérez =

Spanish lawyer and politician

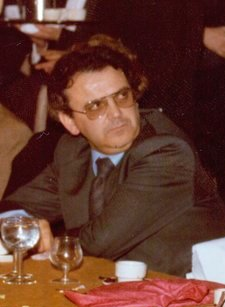

Minister of Health and Consumer Affairs
- In office 2 December 1981 – 3 December 1982
- Prime Minister: Leopoldo Calvo-Sotelo
- Preceded by: Office established
- Succeeded by: Ernest Lluch

Personal details
- Born: Manuel Núñez Pérez; 28 October 1933 (age 92) Benavides, León, Spain
- Party: UCD; PDP; PP
- Education: University of Oviedo

Manuel Núñez Pérez (born 28 October 1933) is a Spanish lawyer and politician from the Union of the Democratic Centre (UCD) who served as Minister of Health and Consumer Affairs from December 1981 to December 1982.
