= A Barcala =

Coordinates: 43.303°N 8.353°W

- Comarca
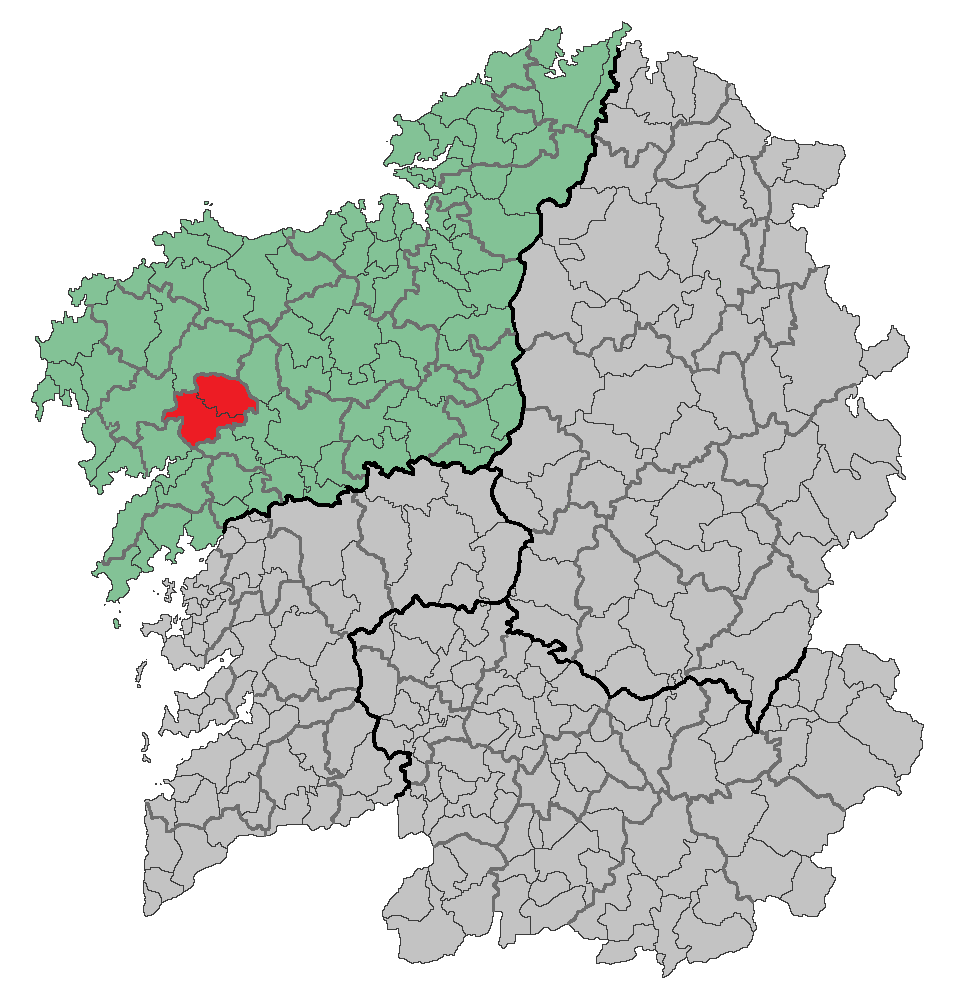
- Country: Spain
- Autonomous community: Galicia
- Province: A Coruña
- Capital: Negreira
- Municipalities: List: A Baña, Negreira

Area
  - Total: 213.5 km^{2} (82.4 sq mi)

Population (2019)
  - Total: 10,277
  - Density: 48.14/km^{2} (124.7/sq mi)
- Demonym: barcalés
- Time zone: UTC+1 (CET)
  - Summer (DST): UTC+2 (CEST)
- Largest municipality: Negreira

A Barcala is a comarca in the province of A Coruña, Galicia, Spain. Its capital town is Negreira. It contains two municipalities (Negreira and A Baña) and 10,277 inhabitants (2019) in an area of 213.5 km^{2} (82.4 sq mi).

The comarca is located in northwest Spain. It borders three other comarcas: Xallas to the north; Santiago to the south and east; and Noia to the west.

There is the Barcala river (Río Barcala) in the province of A Coruña, Galicia, Spain.
