= Ernest Lluch =

Spanish politician and economist (1937–2000)

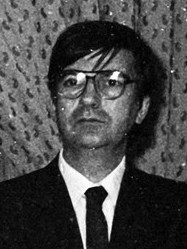
- Ernest Lluch in 1986

Minister of Health and Consumer Affairs
- In office 3 December 1982 – 25 July 1986
- Monarch: Juan Carlos I
- Prime Minister: Felipe González
- Preceded by: Manuel Núñez Pérez
- Succeeded by: Julián García Vargas

Member of the Congress of Deputies
- In office 15 June 1977 – 31 January 1989
- Succeeded by: Josep Corominas i Busqueta
- Constituency: Barcelona (1982–1989); Girona (1977–1982)

Personal details
- Born: Ernest Lluch Martín; 21 January 1937 Vilassar de Mar, Spain
- Died: 21 November 2000 (aged 63) Barcelona, Catalonia, Spain
- Cause of death: Ballistic trauma
- Occupation: Economist; Politician
- Known for: Victim of assassination

Ernest Lluch Martín, OC3, OCS, (21 January 1937 – 21 November 2000) was a Spanish economist and politician, member of the Socialists' Party of Catalonia (PSC). He was Minister of Health and Consumer Affairs from 1982 to 1986 in the first Spanish Socialist Workers' Party (PSOE) government of Felipe González. He was assassinated in 2000 by the Basque separatist organisation, ETA.

== Background ==
Lluch was born in Vilassar de Mar, Barcelona province. He earned a PhD in Economic Sciences at the University of Barcelona (UB), and studied further at the Sorbonne in Paris. While he was a lecturer at the UB, he was arrested on several occasions and expelled from the university because of his anti-francoist political activity. From this position, he published seminal works on Spanish political economy. He held the Chair of Economics at the University of Valencia (1974) and the Chair of History of Economic Doctrines at the UB. His last official position was as Director of the Menéndez Pelayo International University in Santander, from 1989 to 1995.

== Career ==
In April 1980 he was chosen as spokesman of the Socialists' Party of Catalonia (PSC) to the Congress of Deputies, and, two years later, in the 1982 general election, he was elected member of the Lower House in representation of Barcelona. Felipe González appointed him as Minister of Health and Consumer Affairs in his first government. He held the post until 1986.

In May 1986 he retired from politics to resume the chair of History of Economic Doctrines of the University of Barcelona. On 2 January 1989 he took up his position as Director of the Menéndez Pelayo International University in Santander.

== Death ==
On November 21, 2000, Lluch was assassinated by ETA, who shot him twice in the head at his home in Barcelona. Responsibility for the killing was claimed by ETA's so-called Barcelona Commando, formed by Fernando García Jodrá, alias 'Txomin', Liarni Artmendaritz and José Antonio Krutxaga. In 2002, the three members of the Commando were arrested and convicted and sentenced by the Audiencia Nacional to 33 years in prison for the murder.

After his death, the Government granted him the Grand Cross of the Civil Order of Health.

== Bibliography ==
- El pensament econòmic a Catalunya (1760-1849). Edicions 62, 1973. ISBN 9788429766059
- La via valenciana. Editorial Tres i Quatre, 1976 (Premi Joan Fuster d'assaig, 1975) ISBN 9788485211159
- La Catalunya vençuda del segle XVIII. Foscors i clarors de la Il·lustració. Edicions 62, 1996. ISBN 9788429742213
- Las Españas vencidas del siglo XVIII. Editorial Crítica, 1999. ISBN 9788474239249
- L'alternativa catalana (1700-1714-1740). Ramon de Vilana i Perlas i Juan Amor de Soria: teoria i acció austriacistes. Eumo Editorial, 2000. ISBN 9788476027127
- La passió per la música. Recerques d'un melòman il.lustrat. CCG Edicions, 2004. ISBN 9788495483867

== See also ==
- Ernest Lluch station - a Trambaix and Barcelona Metro line L5 stop.
