= A Baña =

- municipality
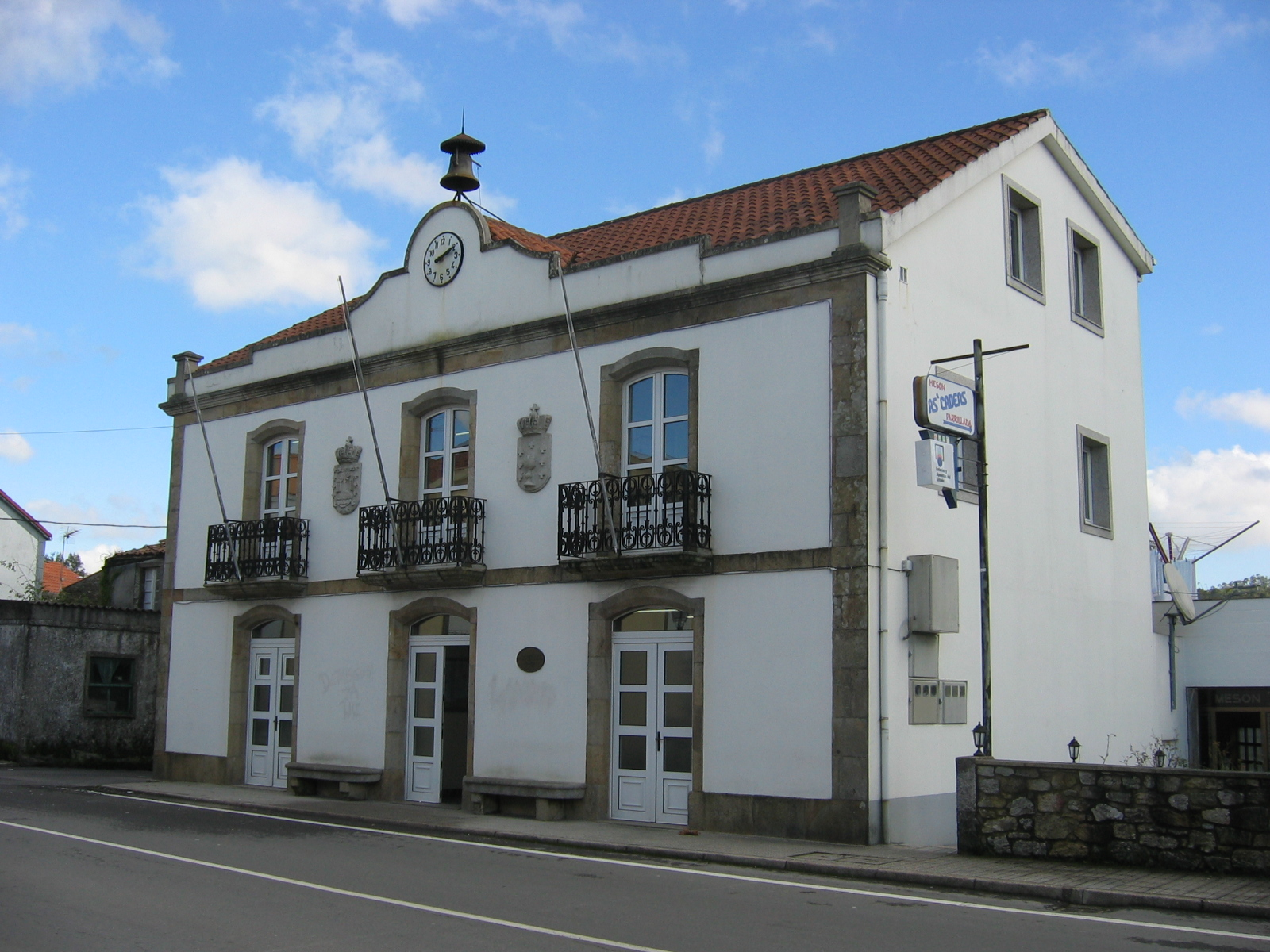
- Town hall.

- Coat of arms

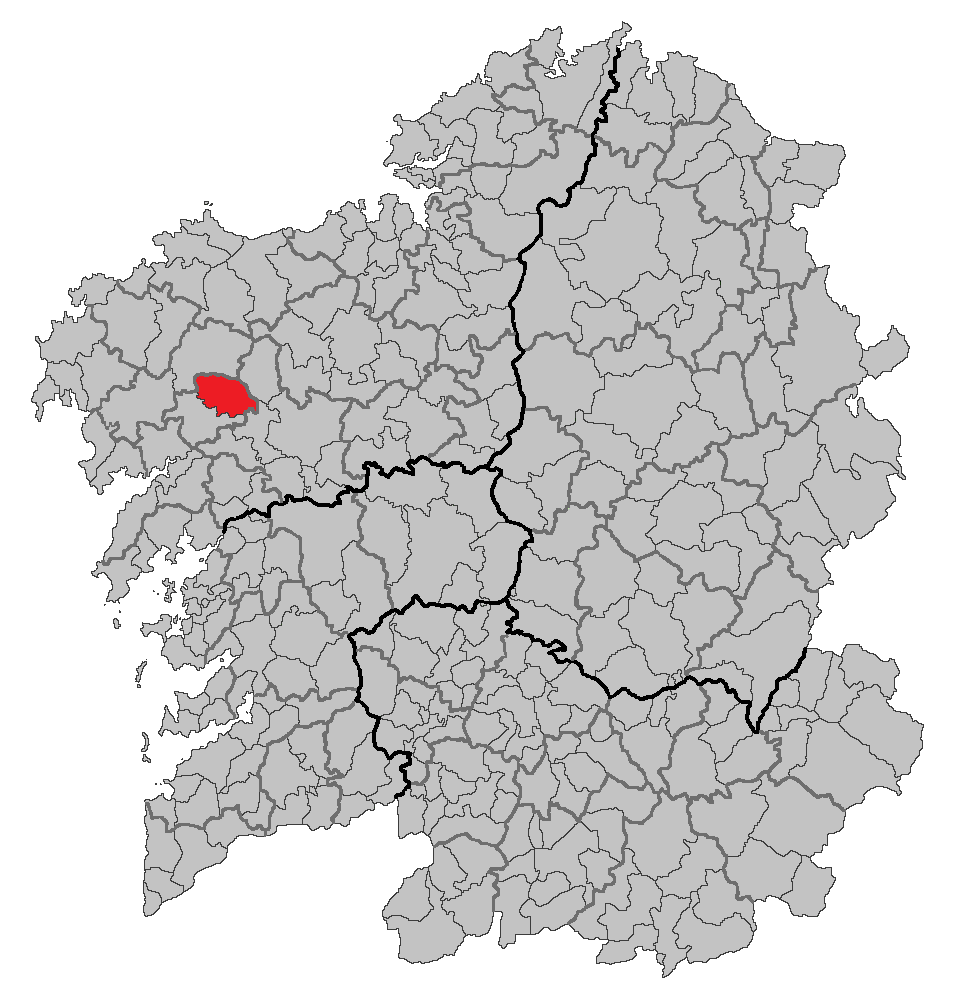
- Location of A Baña within Galicia
- Coordinates: 42.967°N 8.767°W
- Country: Spain
- Autonomous community: Galicia
- Province: A Coruña
- Comarca: A Barcala

Area
  - Total: 98.63 km^{2} (38.08 sq mi)

Population (2025-01-01)
  - Total: 3,239
  - Density: 32.84/km^{2} (85.05/sq mi)
- Time zone: UTC+1 (CET)
  - Summer (DST): UTC+2 (CEST)
- Website: http://concellodabana.gal/

A Baña is a municipality in the province of A Coruña in the autonomous community of Galicia in northwestern Spain. It belongs to the comarca of A Barcala. It is 52 kilometers from the provincial capital of A Coruña. It has an area of 98.63 km^{2}, a population of 3,291 (2024 estimate), and a population density of 33.37 people/km^{2}.

== Demographics ==
Population change of the municipality from 1991 to 2004
2004	2001	1996	1991
4888	4800	5836	5864

== Vesía ==
Vesía is a town situated near the centre of the A Baña municipality, in the A Coruña province. It is part of the parish of San Vicente, the capital of the municipality. Vesía is at an altitude of 317.6 meters above sea level, and stands at an incline of 20.89%. Vesía has a population of around 40 people, the majority of whom are between 65 and 80 years old as the area has suffered youth emigration.

== See also ==
- List of municipalities in A Coruña
