= Ames, Spain =

Ames
- Municipality
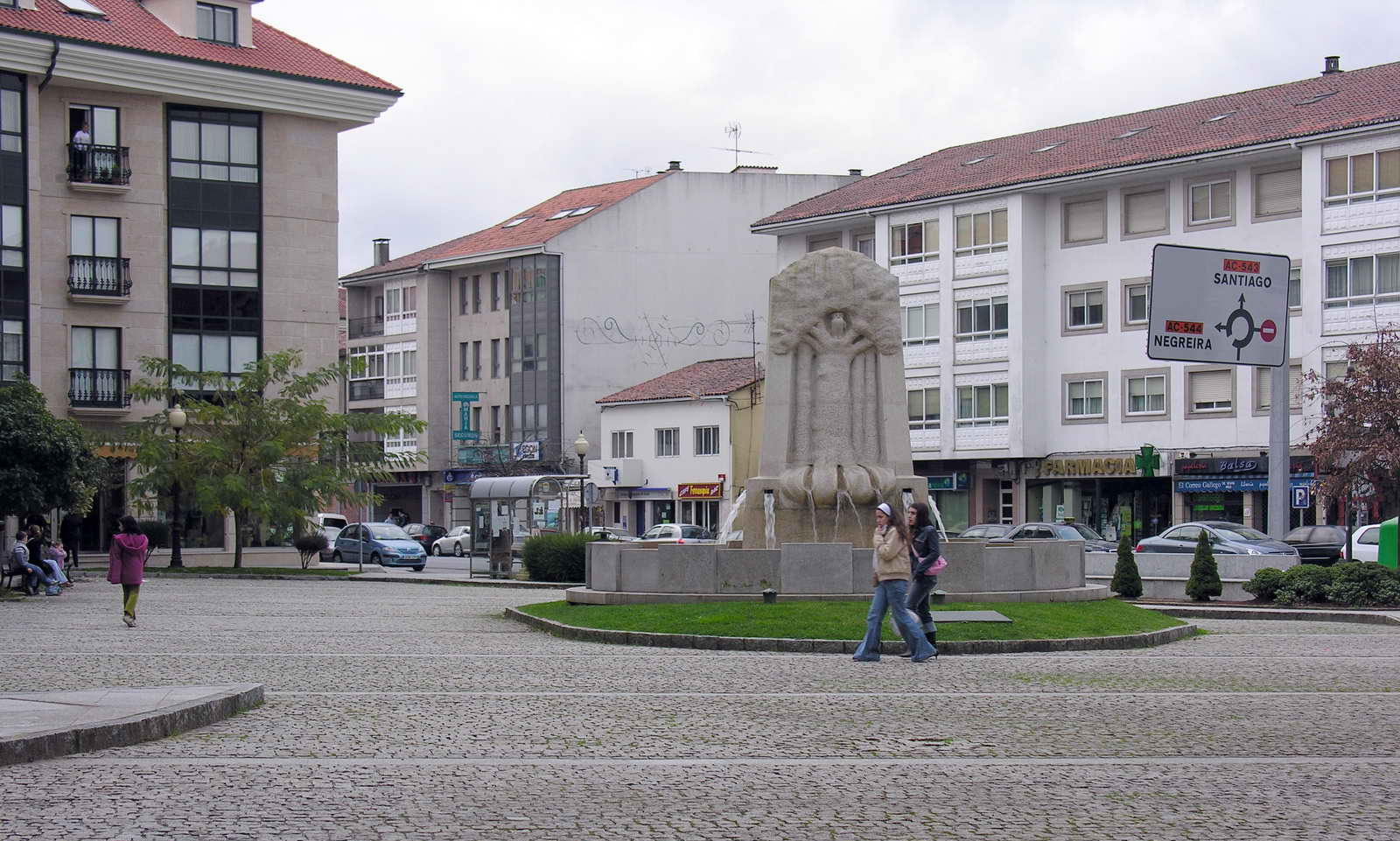

- Coat of arms

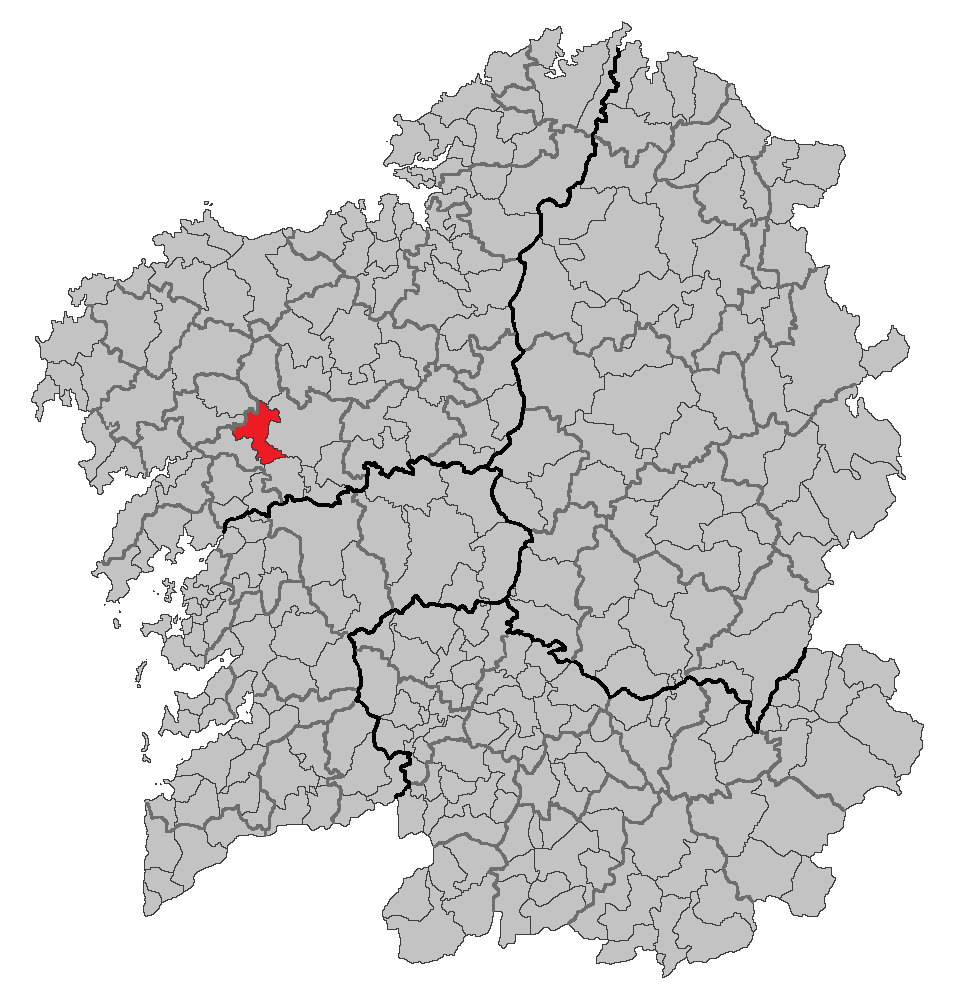
- Situation of Ames within Galicia
- Coordinates: 42°54′N 8°38′W
- Country: Spain
- Autonomous community: Galicia
- Province: A Coruña
- Parroquias: 11

Government
  - Alcalde (Mayor): José Miñones (PSOE)

Area
  - Total: 80.55 km^{2} (31.10 sq mi)

Population (2024)
  - Total: 32,812
  - Density: 407.3/km^{2} (1,055/sq mi)
- Time zone: UTC+1 (CET)
  - Summer (DST): UTC+2 (CEST)

Ames is a municipality of the autonomous community of Galicia, Spain in the province of A Coruña. It has an area of 80.55 square kilometres (31.10 sq mi), a population of 26,983 inhabitants (INE, 2009) and a density of 258.72 per square kilometre (670.1/sq mi). It belongs to the comarca of Santiago de Compostela.

== Demography ==
Historical population
Year	Pop.	±%
1900	7,097	—
1930	7,602	+7.1%
1950	9,425	+24.0%
1981	9,527	+1.1%
2004	20,840	+118.7%
2015	30,267	+45.2%
2024	32,812	+8.4%

== Parroquias ==
- Agrón (San Lourenzo)
- Ameixenda (Santa María)
- Ames (Santo Tomé)
- Biduído (Santa María)
- Bugallido (San Pedro)
- Covas (San Estebo)
- Lens (San Paio)
- Milladoiro (Santa María)
- Ortoño (San Xoán)
- Piñeiro (San Mamede)
- Tapia (San Cristovo)
- Trasmonte (Santa María)

== Gallery ==
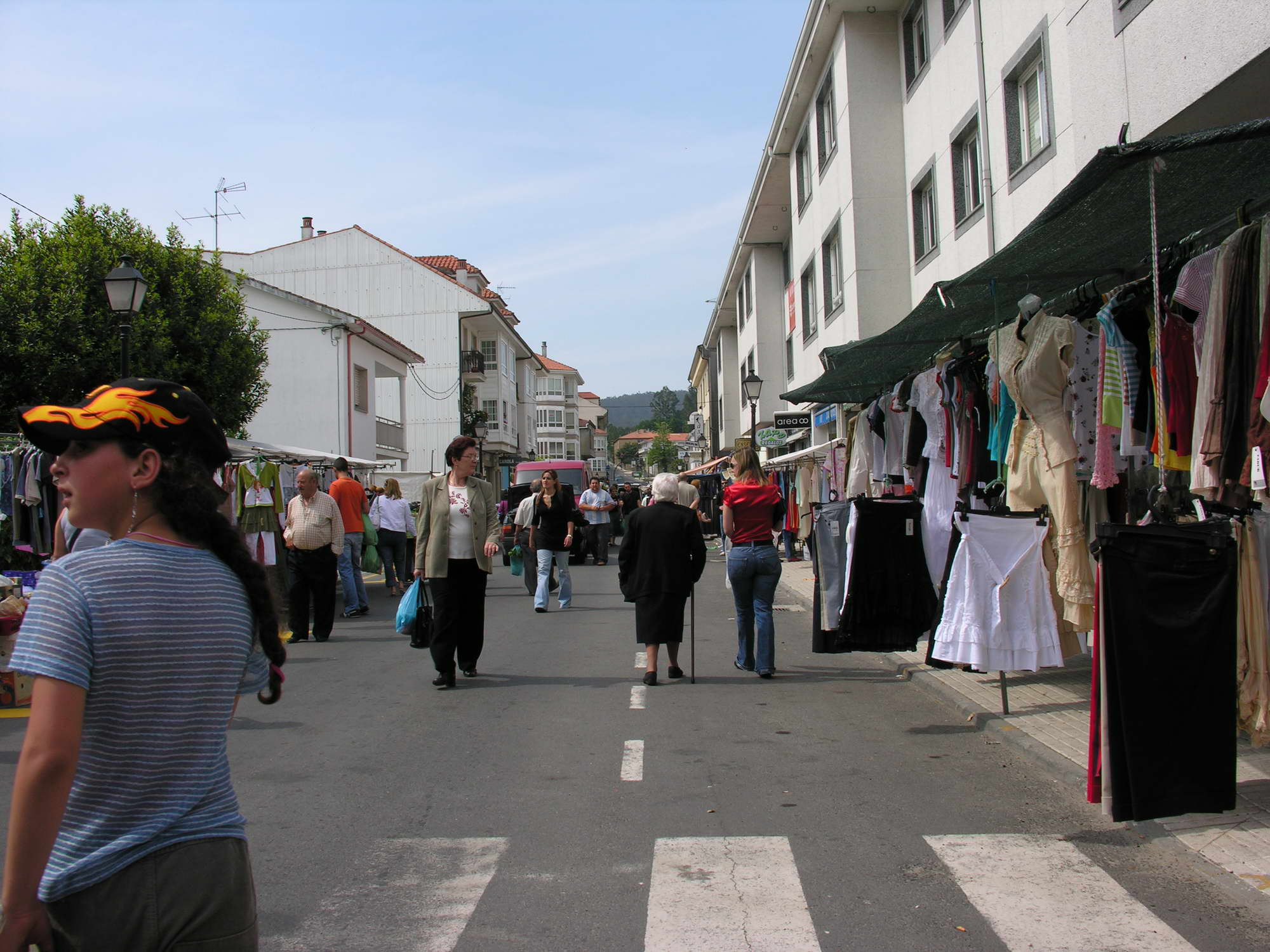
Saturday market in Bertamiráns, Ames

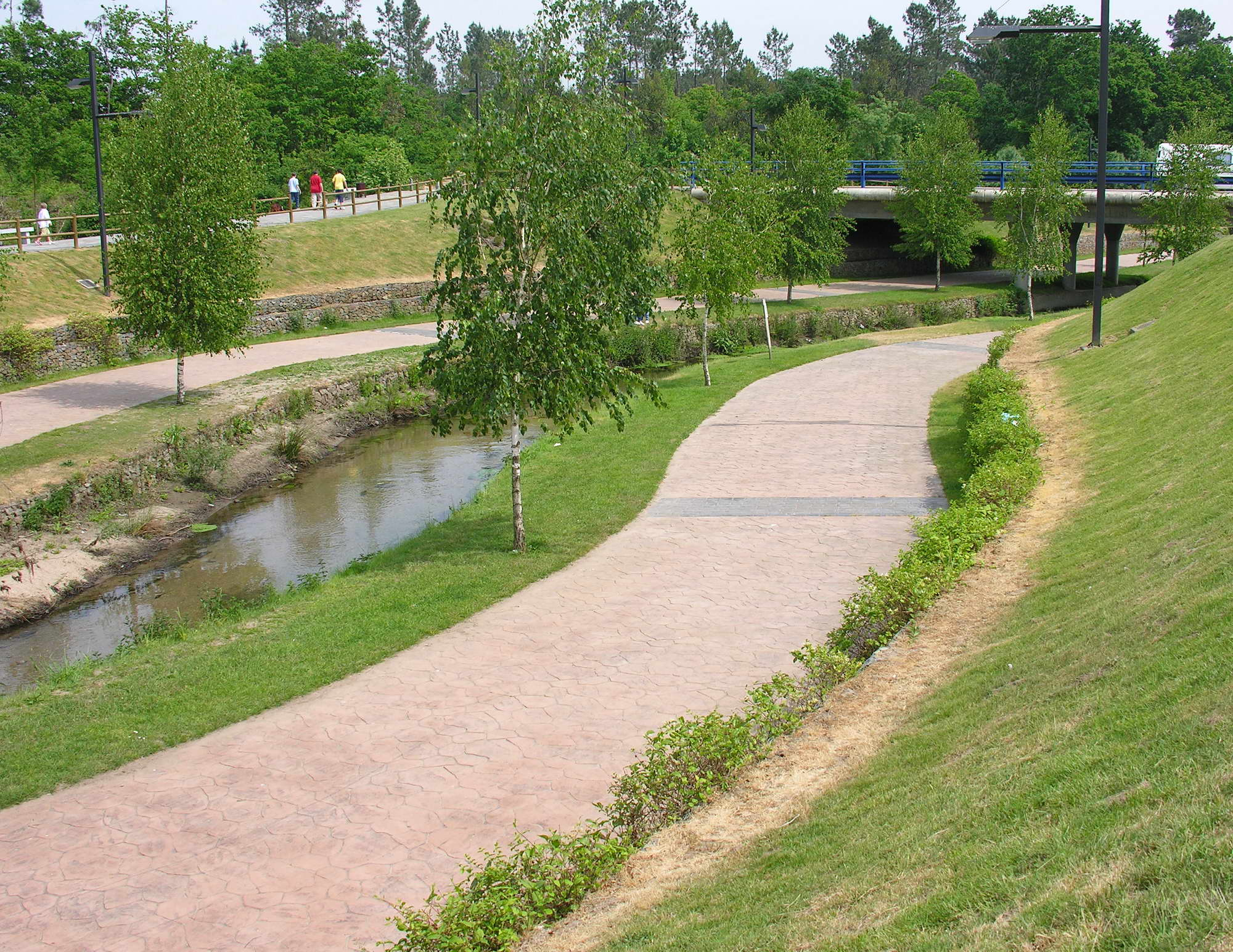
River in Bertamiráns, Ames

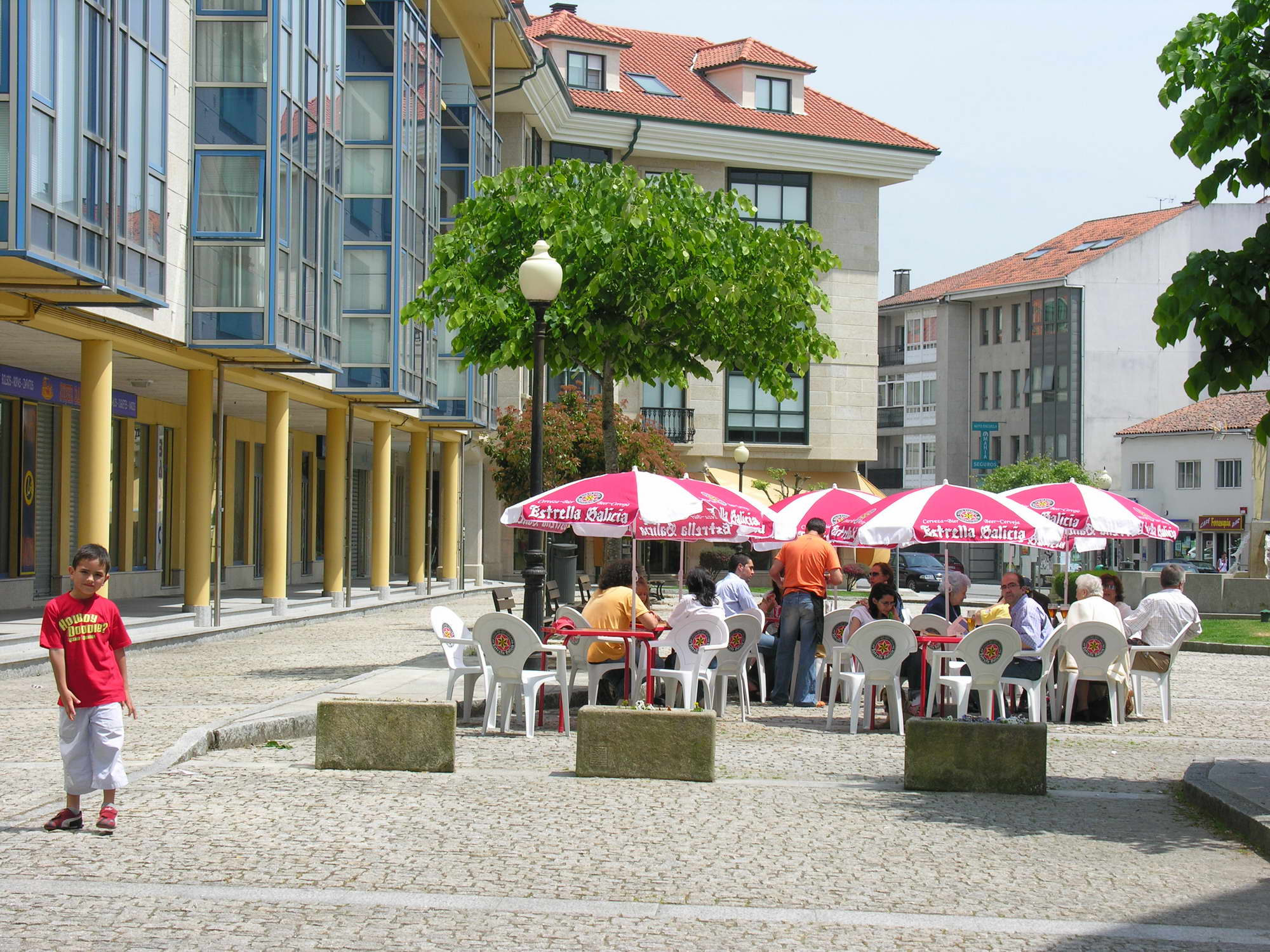
Square in Bertamiráns, Ames

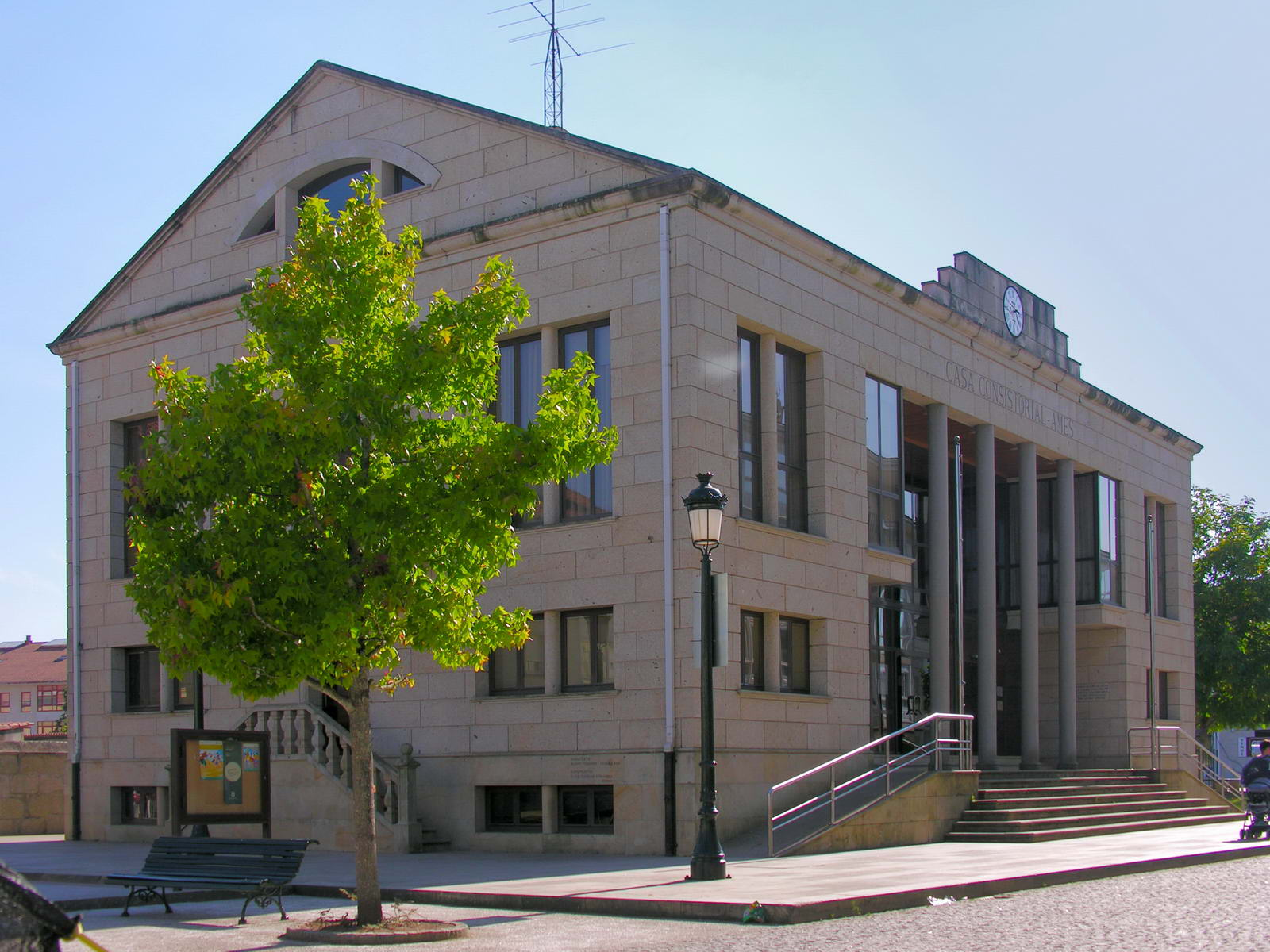
Town hall

== See also ==
- List of municipalities in A Coruña
