= Street names in Barcelona =

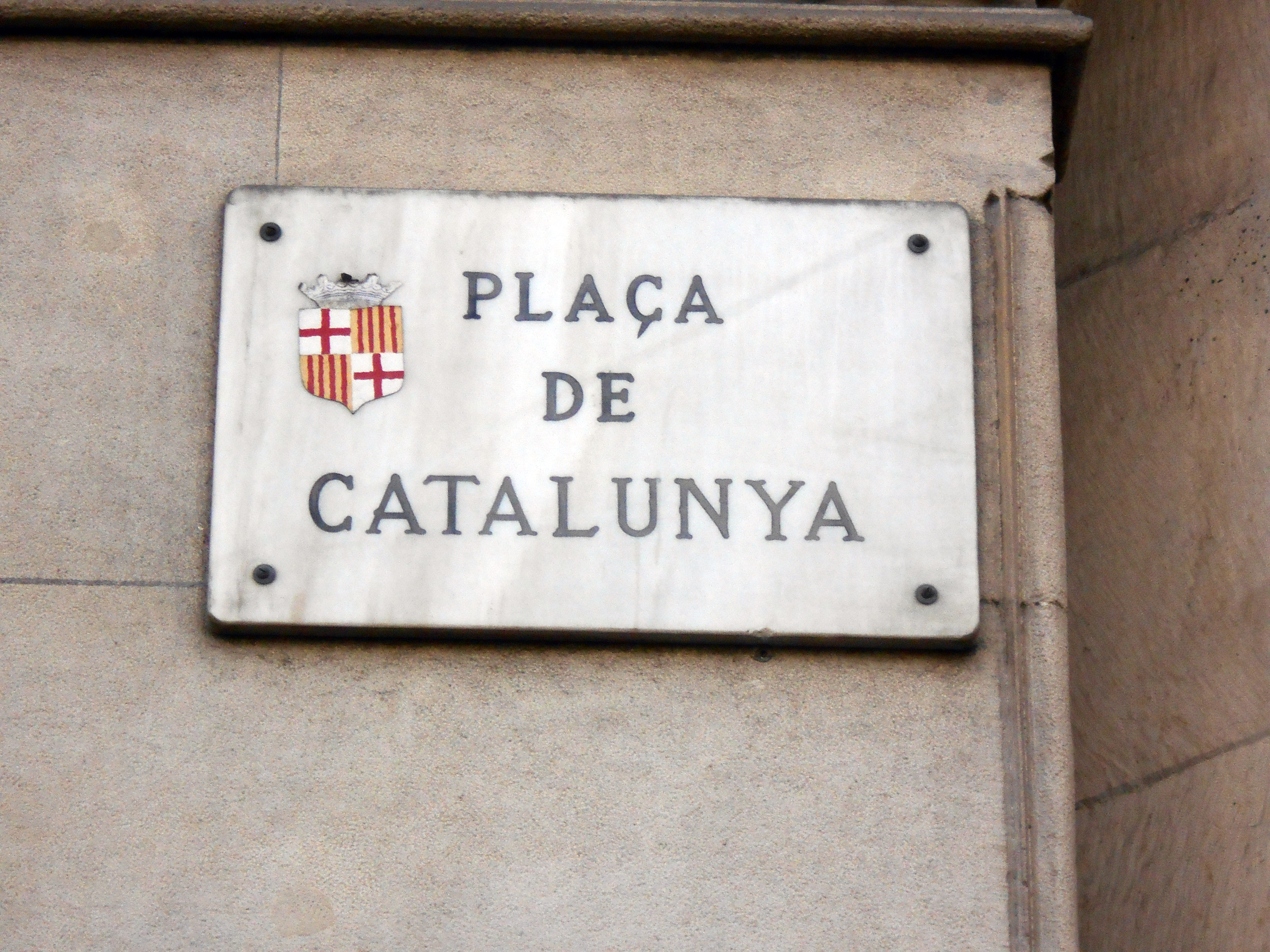
Plaça de Catalunya sign. Since the end of the 19th century it has been the hub of Barcelona

The odonyms of Barcelona — meaning the street names in Barcelona along with the names of thoroughfares and other roads in the city — are regulated by the Ponència de Nomenclàtor dels Carrers de Barcelona, a commission under the Department of Culture of the Barcelona City Council.

These names have changed over time, reflecting the various historical, social, political, economic, and cultural events that have taken place in the city. Its evolution has also been marked by various factors, such as urban planning and the physical and territorial changes that have occurred in the physiognomy of the city, mainly derived from its geographic expansion along the Barcelona plain, with two main milestones: the Plan de Eixample developed by Ildefons Cerdà and the addition of neighboring municipalities, between the 19th and 20th centuries.

The oldest street names still existing in Barcelona are of medieval origin. However, their regulation did not begin until the 19th century, and it was not until the middle of that century that street signs began to be placed with their names. On the other hand, although until that century the odonyms came primarily from tradition, since then there has been a frequent alteration of street naming for political reasons, with various important events: the Liberal Triennium of 1820–1823, the liberal periods of 1840 and 1854, the Sexenio Democrático (1868–1874), the dictatorship of Primo de Rivera (1923–1929), the Second Republic (1931–1939), the Francoist dictatorship (1939–1975) and the democratic restoration.

In Barcelona there are various types of public roads, the most common of which are: street, alley, square, plaza, small square, promenade, avenue, boulevard, boulevard, road, roundabout, passage, descent, stairs, crossing, viewpoint, path, and road, in addition to docks, breakwaters, beaches, parks and gardens. In 2016 there were 4,518 streets with a total length of 1,300 kilometres.

== Geography and location ==
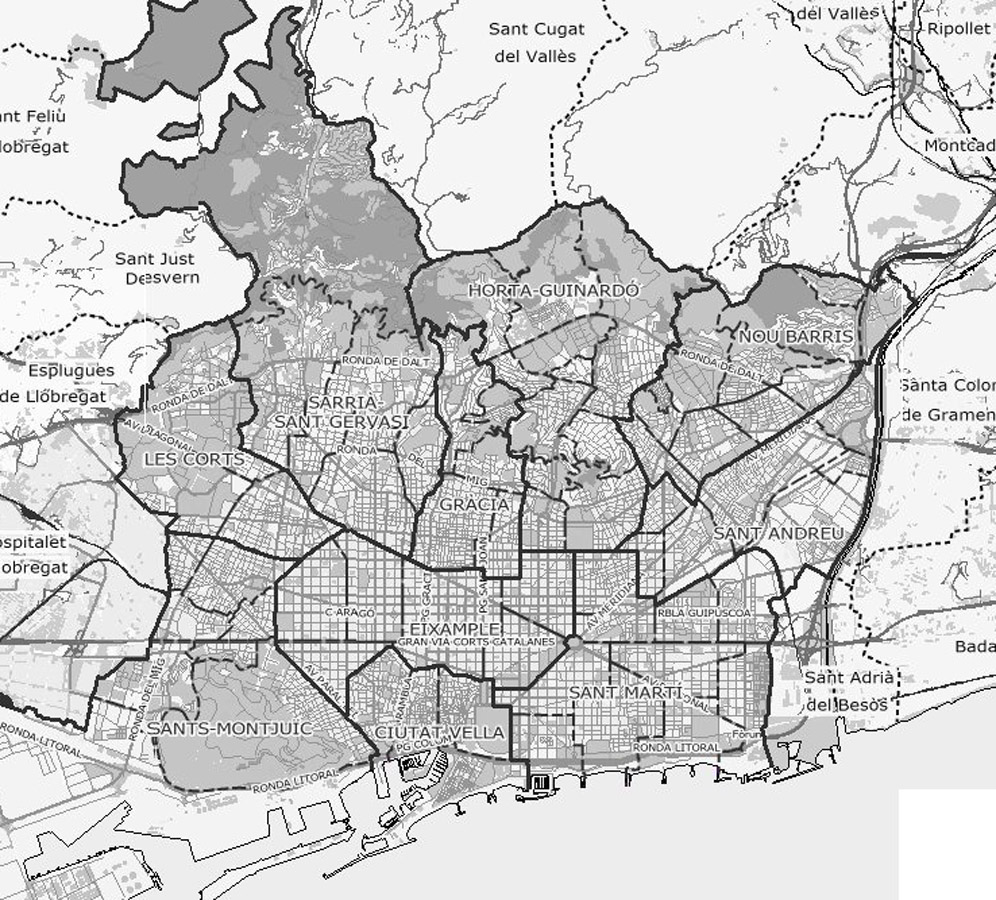
Map of Barcelona

Barcelona, capital of the autonomous community of Catalonia, is located in the Spanish Levant, on the Mediterranean coast. Its geographical location is between 41° 16' and 41° 30' north latitude and between 1° 54' and 2° 18' east longitude. With a surface area of 102.16 km^{2}, it is located on a plain about 11 km long and 6 km wide, bounded on its sides by the sea and by the Serra de Collserola — with the summit of Tibidabo (516.2 m) as its highest point — as well as by the deltas of the Besòs and Llobregat rivers. Above the coastline and separating the city from the Llobregat delta is the Montjuïc mountain (184.8 m).

Barcelona is also the capital of the comarca of the Barcelonès and of the province of Barcelona, and is the most important urban center of Catalonia in demographic, political, economic, and cultural terms. It is the headquarters of the autonomous government and the Parliament of Catalonia, as well as the provincial council, the archbishopric, and the IV Military Region, and has a port, an airport and an important network of railroads and roads. With a population of 1,604,555 inhabitants in 2015, it is the second most populated city in Spain after Madrid, and the eleventh in the European Union.

== Administrative divisions ==
Barcelona districts.

Barcelona is divided into 10 districts and 73 neighborhoods:

- Ciutat Vella (4.49 km^{2}, 100,685 inhabitants): corresponds to the old part of the city — hence the name "old city" — derived from the Roman and medieval periods, plus La Barceloneta neighborhood, created in the 18th century.
- Eixample (7.46 km^{2}, 263,565 inhabitants): this district arose from the expansion of the old city after the demolition of the walls, thanks to the Plan de Eixample drawn up by Ildefons Cerdà.
- Sants-Montjuïc (21.35 km^{2}, 180,824 inhabitants): includes the old town of Sants, annexed to Barcelona in 1897, together with the land of Montjuïc mountain, making it the largest district of the city; it also includes the Zona Franca. The old toponym (place name) comes from the church of Santa Maria dels Sants ("Saint Mary of the Saints"), and is present in the street and square of Sants, while Montjuïc ("Jewish mountain") has a park, a promenade, and a road with that name.
- Les Corts (6.08 km^{2}, 81,200 inhabitants): comes from the old town of Les Corts de Sarrià, added to the city in 1897, with a probable origin in a medieval farmhouse, hence the name (from the Latin cohors, country house). It was a predominantly agricultural area, which in the mid-19th century experienced a notable urban increase with the construction of the area called Corts Noves. It is found in the gazetteer in a street, a square and a crossing that bear the name of Les Corts. It includes the area of Pedralbes, formerly belonging to Sarrià; there is a square and an avenue with that name, coming from the monastery of Santa María de Pedralbes, from the Latin word petras albas ("white stones").
- Sarrià-Sant Gervasi (20.09 km^{2}, 145,761 inhabitants): it comes from the union of two former municipalities, Sarrià and Sant Gervasi de Cassoles. It is one of the largest districts, especially because it includes a large part of the Serra de Collserola. The name Sarrià comes from the Latin Serrianum, probably derived from the patronymic Serrius; it has remained in the homonymous square and avenue, as well as in the streets Mayor and Minor de Sarrià, the Camí Vell de Sarrià and the road from Sarrià to Vallvidrera. For its part, Sant Gervasi de Cassoles (where a cassola is a narrow passage between ravines) is located in the street of Sant Gervasi de Cassoles and Passeig de Sant Gervasi. It includes what was also the old municipality of Vallvidrera (from the Latin Vallis Vitrariae), incorporated into the town of Sarrià in 1892; this place name includes an avenue, a square, a road and a shortcut with that name, as well as the road from Vallvidrera to Tibidabo and the roads from Vallvidrera to Barcelona, les Planes and Tibidabo.

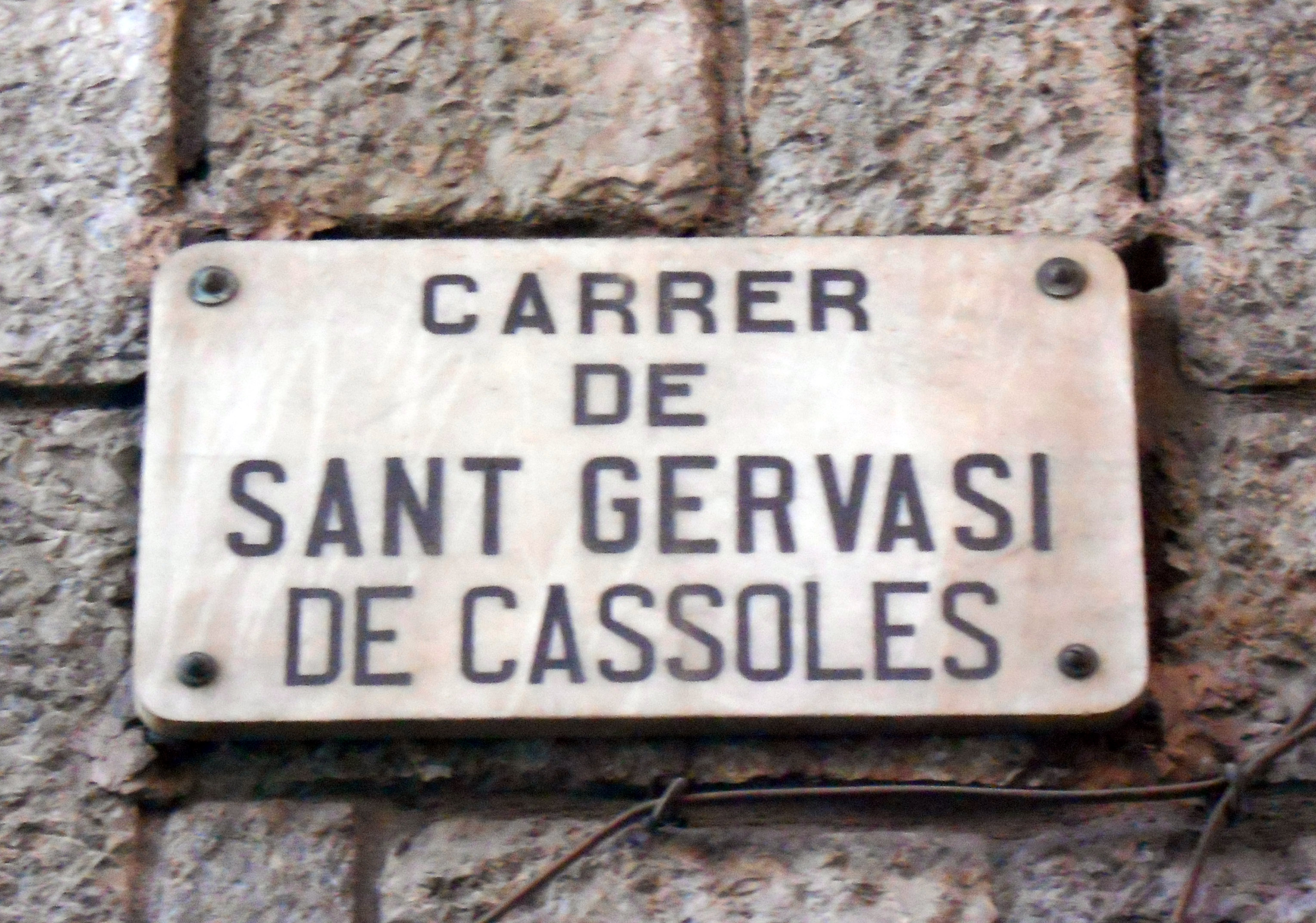
Sant Gervasi de Cassoles Street

- Gràcia (4.19 km^{2}, 120,273 inhabitants): has its origins in the old village of Gràcia, incorporated into the city in 1897. It was an agricultural area, which in the early 19th century began to forge an urban and industrial network. It has its origin in the church of Nostra Senyora de Gràcia i Sant Josep, founded in the 17th century. Its name has endured in the street, the promenade and the crossing of Gracia, as well as in the main street of Gràcia and the Plaça de la Vila de Gràcia.
- Horta-Guinardó (11.96 km^{2}, 166 950 inhabitants): comes from the old town of Horta, added in 1904, to which the Guinardó district, formerly belonging to Sant Martí de Provençals, was added administratively. The old municipality appears in the nomenclature on Horta street and the road from Horta to Cerdanyola. For its part, Guinardó has a street, a square, a roundabout and a park.
- Nou Barris (8.04 km^{2}, 164,516 inhabitants): is the most recently created district, on land segregated from Sant Andreu del Palomar. Its name comes from the fact that originally there were "nine neighborhoods", although there are currently 13. It entered the street map in 1982 with the street of Nou Barris and in 2001 with the homonymous square, in addition to the Plaça Major de Nou Barris in 2008. Its oldest neighborhood is Vilapicina, an ancient village that arose around the sanctuary of Santa Eulàlia de Vilapicina, from the tenth century; the term comes from villa and black pine pitch called in Latin pix, whose place of production was a pixina or picina, and is remembered in the street of Vilapicina.
- Sant Andreu (6.56 km^{2}, 145,983 inhabitants): corresponds to the former municipality of Sant Andreu de Palomar, annexed in 1897. It was an agricultural and milling area until the mid-19th century, when many industries began to settle. Its memory is remembered in the stream of Sant Andreu, the main street of Sant Andreu and the street of Palomar.
- Sant Martí (10.80 km^{2}, 232 629 inhabitants): it comes from the old village of Sant Martí de Provençals, added in 1897. It has dedicated the street, the round and the park of Sant Martí, as well as the street of Provençals. The old municipality was divided into four neighborhoods: Sagrera, Muntanya, Clot and Taulat, all of them remembered with streets.
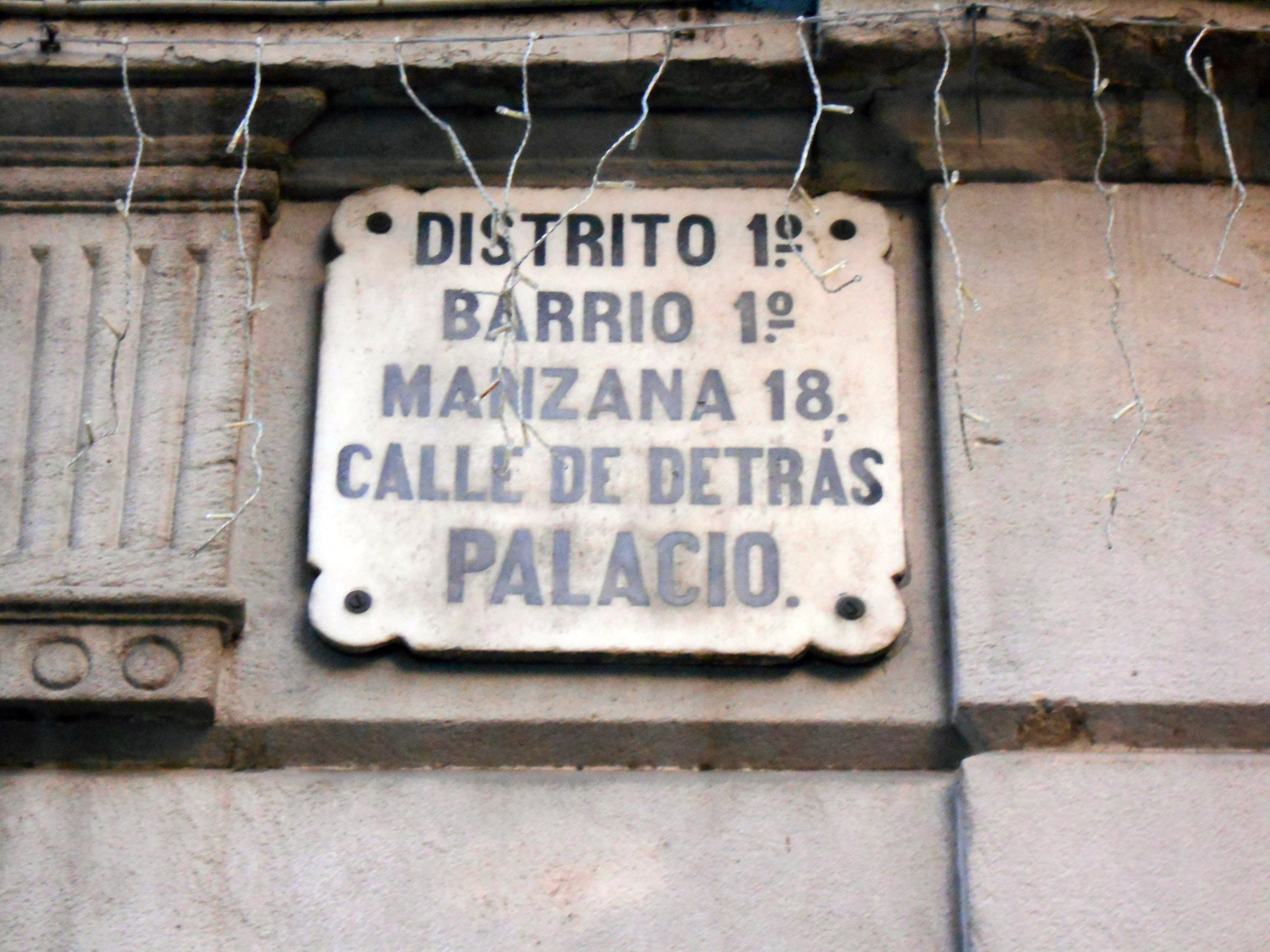
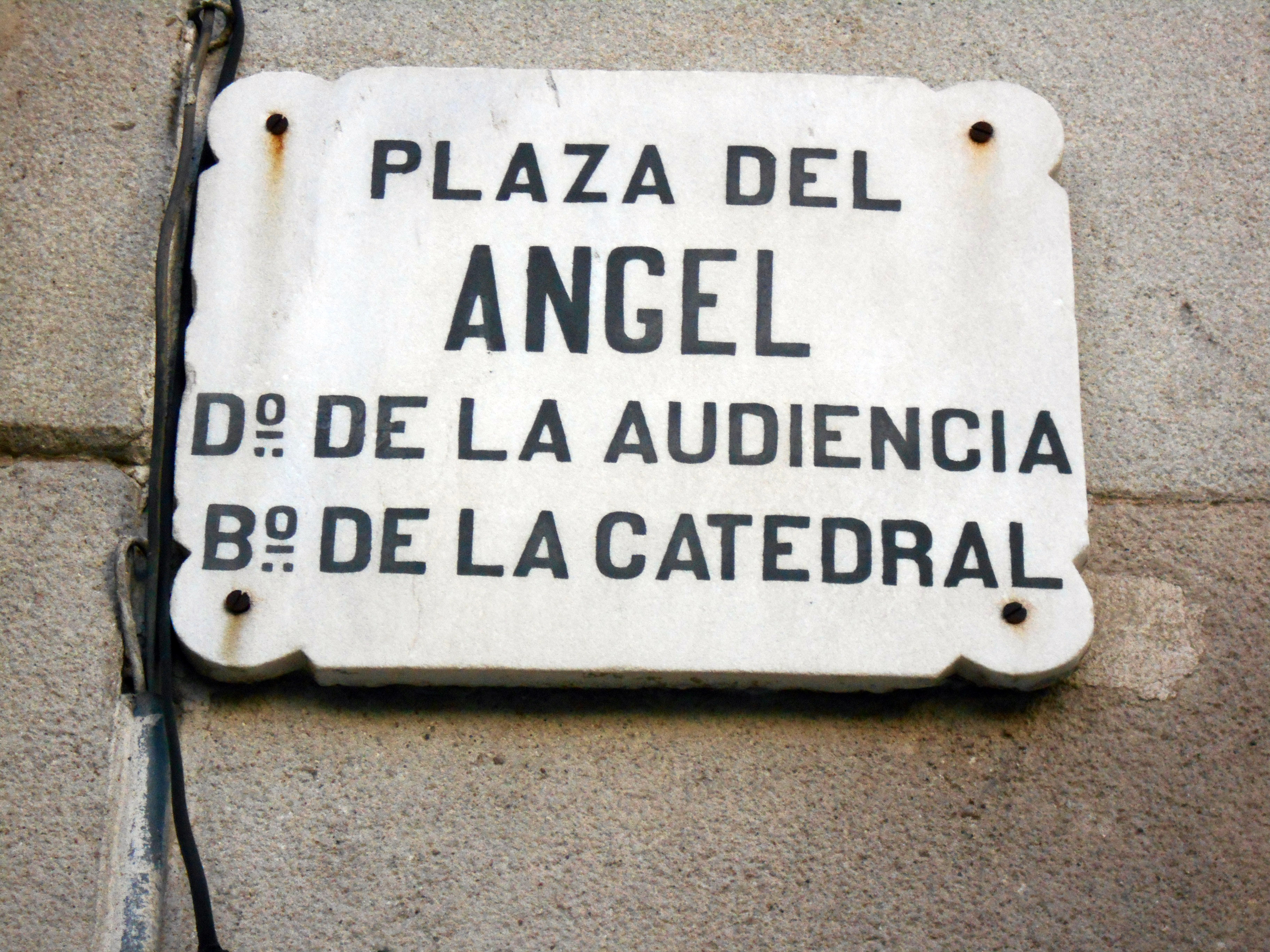
Some plates of the old town still bear their old administrative demarcation, either with the district number or with the name.

The administrative division has varied over time. The first delimitation was established in 1389, when the city was divided into four quarters: Framenors (for the convent of Sant Francesc), Pi (for the church of Santa Maria del Pi), Mar (for the church of Santa Maria del Mar) and Sant Pere (for the monastery of Sant Pere de les Puelles). This division was made by establishing a grid with the Plaça del Blat as the geometric center, with a separation of the north and south quarters set in the ancient Roman cardo maximus. In the 15th century another quarter was added, that of El Raval ("arrabal"), thus establishing a division that lasted until the 18th century.

In 1769 a reform was carried out that created five districts, each subdivided into eight neighborhoods: I-Palacio included the port and the new neighborhood of La Barceloneta; II-San Pedro was an eminently industrial area; III-Audiencia corresponded to the center of the city; IV-Casa de la Ciudad was a mainly residential area; and V-Raval included the land west of La Rambla.

Numerous divisions were made in the 19th century, most of them for political reasons, since the districts also marked the electoral districts. The most notable were those of 1837, in which the city was divided into four districts (Lonja, San Pedro, Universidad and San Pablo); and that of 1878, after the demolition of the walls, in which 10 districts were established: I-La Barceloneta, II-Borne, III-Lonja, IV-Atarazanas, V-Hospital, VI-Audiencia, VII-Instituto, VIII-Universidad, IX-Hostafranchs and X-Concepción.

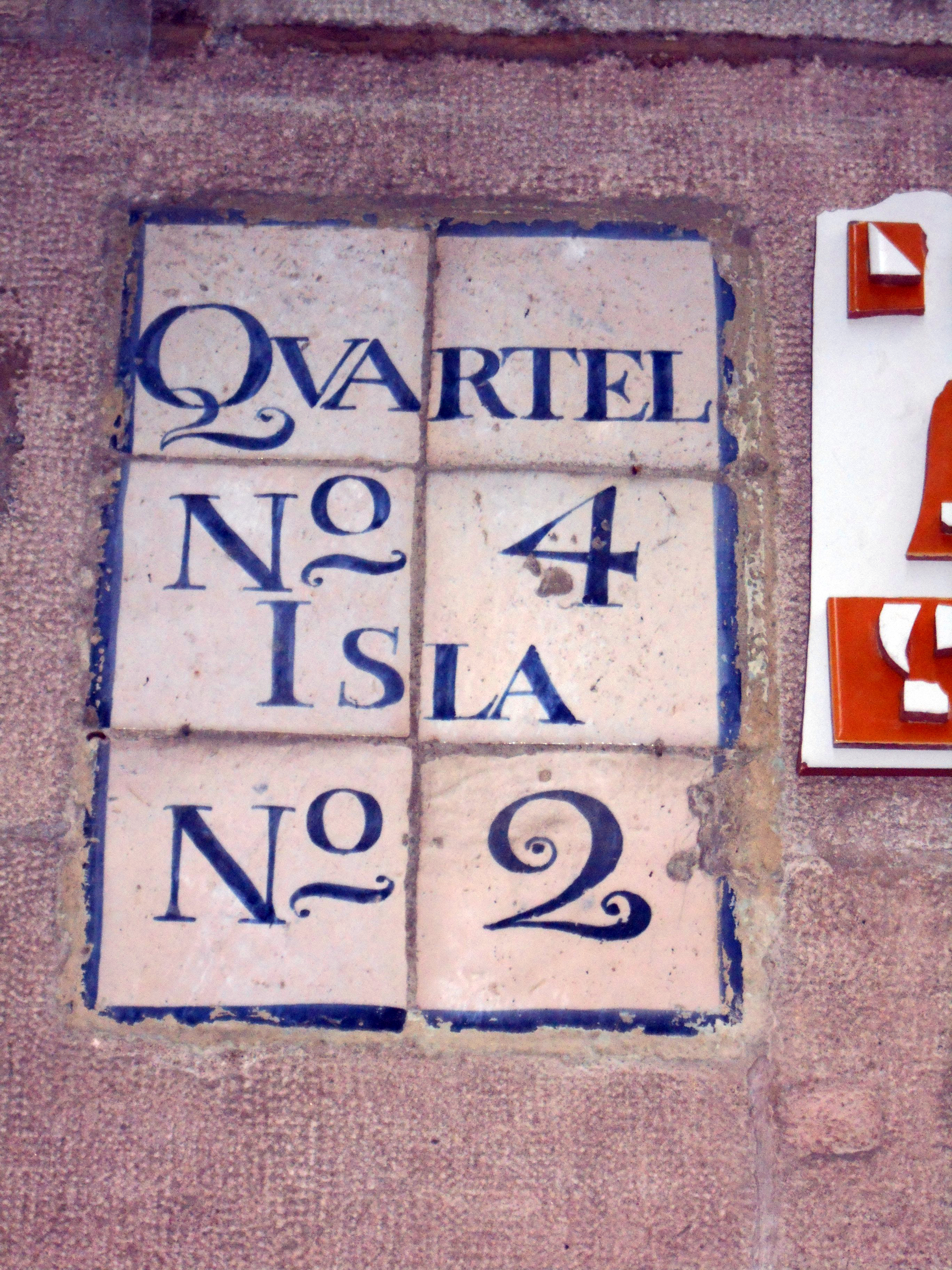
Quarter plate from the 18th century, Carrer del Call.

Between the end of the 19th century and the beginning of the twentieth century, with the aggregation of the bordering municipalities, a new administrative reorganization was carried out, again with 10 districts: I-Barceloneta and Pueblo Nuevo, II-San Pedro, III-Lonja and Audiencia, IV-Concepción, V-Atarazanas and Hospital, VI-Universidad, VII-Sants, Les Corts and Hostafrancs, VIII-Gracia and San Gervasio, IX-Horta and San Andrés del Palomar, X-San Martín de Provensals.

In 1933 a new reformulation was made, also with ten districts: I-Barceloneta, II-Poble Sec and Montjuïc, III-Sarrià, Vallvidrera and Sant Gervasi, IV- Sant Pere i Dreta de L'Eixample, V-Raval, VI-Esquerra de l'Eixample, VII-Sants, Les Corts and Hostafrancs, VIII-Gràcia, IX-Horta, Sant Andreu del Palomar, Sagrera and Camp de l'Arpa, X-Sant Martí de Provençals, Clot and Poblenou. These districts were expanded in 1949 with two more: XI-Les Corts and XII-Sagrada Familia.

In 1984 the current division into ten districts was approved, established with the aim of decentralizing the City Council, transferring competencies to the new consistories. The new districts were established with the maximum respect for their historical and morphological identity, but also seeking a practical and functional delimitation, which would guarantee the neighbors a wide welfare coverage. In general, an effort was made to respect the old demarcations from the old city, its expansion and the aggregated municipalities, although some areas varied with respect to their historical belonging: Pedralbes, previously belonging to Sarrià, became part of Les Corts; Vallcarca, formerly part of Horta, was incorporated into Gràcia; El Guinardó, originally from Sant Martí, was added to Horta; and the new district of Nou Barris was segregated from Sant Andreu.

== History ==
=== Toponymy ===
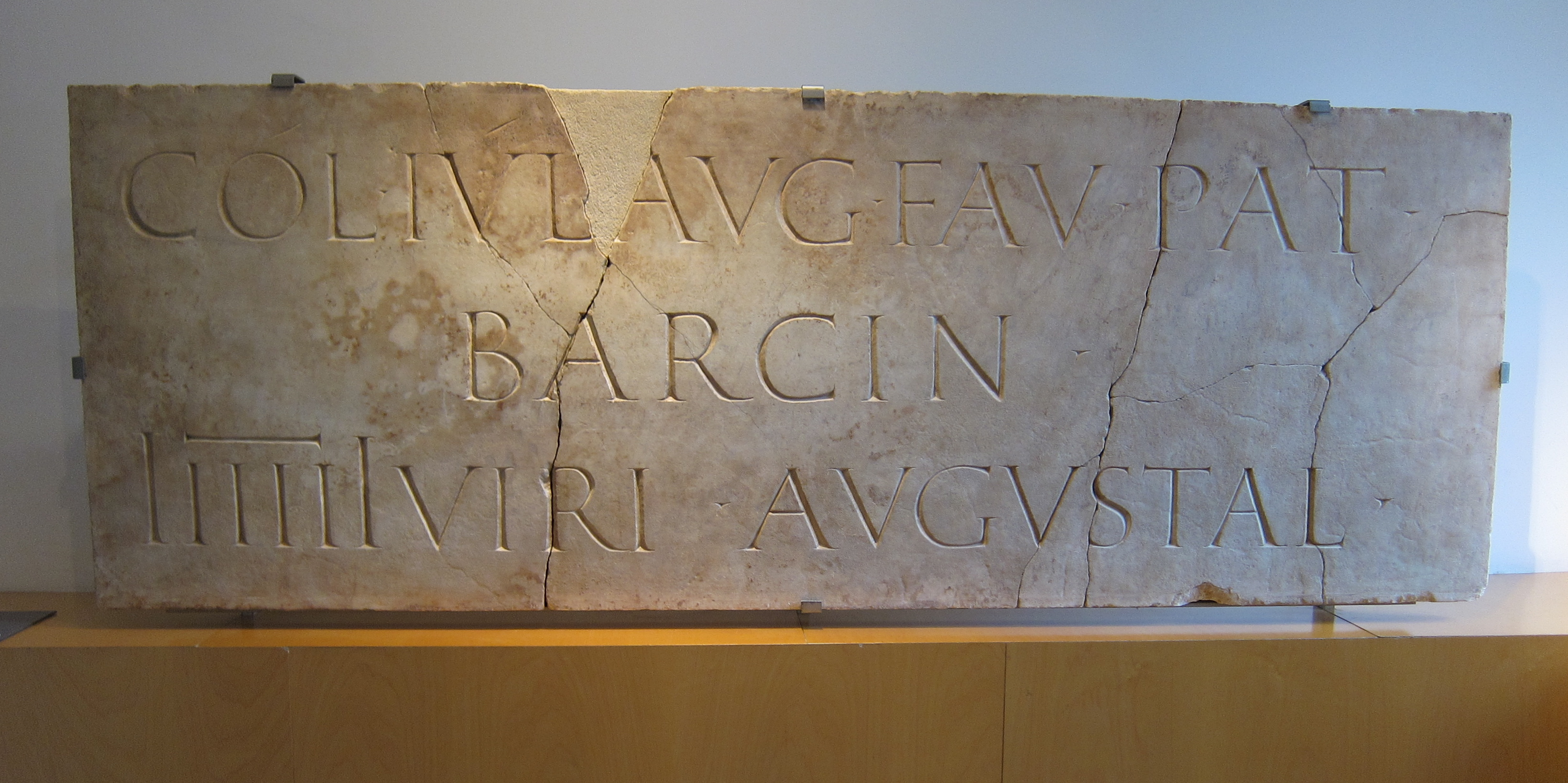
Roman marble stele with the name of Barcino (110–130 A.D.), Museum of the History of Barcelona.

The origin and meaning of the toponym (place name) Barcelona is uncertain. It seems to come from an Iberian settlement called Barkeno, which is mentioned in some Iberian drachmas of the 2nd century BC. This form evolved into the Latin Barcino when the city was founded as a Roman colony in the 1st century B.C. Some legends point to a possible Carthaginian origin, derived from Amilcar Barca, but it seems unlikely, as the legend that attributes the founding of the city to Hercules, who would have landed there in the ninth ship of a fleet, so he would have called it Barca-nona.

Barkeno in Iberian alphabet.

The first written mention of Barcino comes from the first century A.D., by Pomponius Mela, while in the second century A.D. the astronomer Claudius Ptolemy mentions it in Greek as Βαρκινών (Barkinṓn) in his Geography. The toponym evolved between the 4th and 7th centuries: in the 4th Avienius calls it in his Ora maritima as Barcilo, although numerous variants appear then, such as Barcilona, Barcinona, Barcinonem, Barchinon or Barchinonam. On the other hand, already in the year 402 the poet Persius calls it Barcellone, a genitive that suggests the existence of the nominative Barcellona. Isidoro of Seville names it in the 7th century as Barcinona, while already in that century the current form Barcelona appears for the first time.

=== The ancient city ===
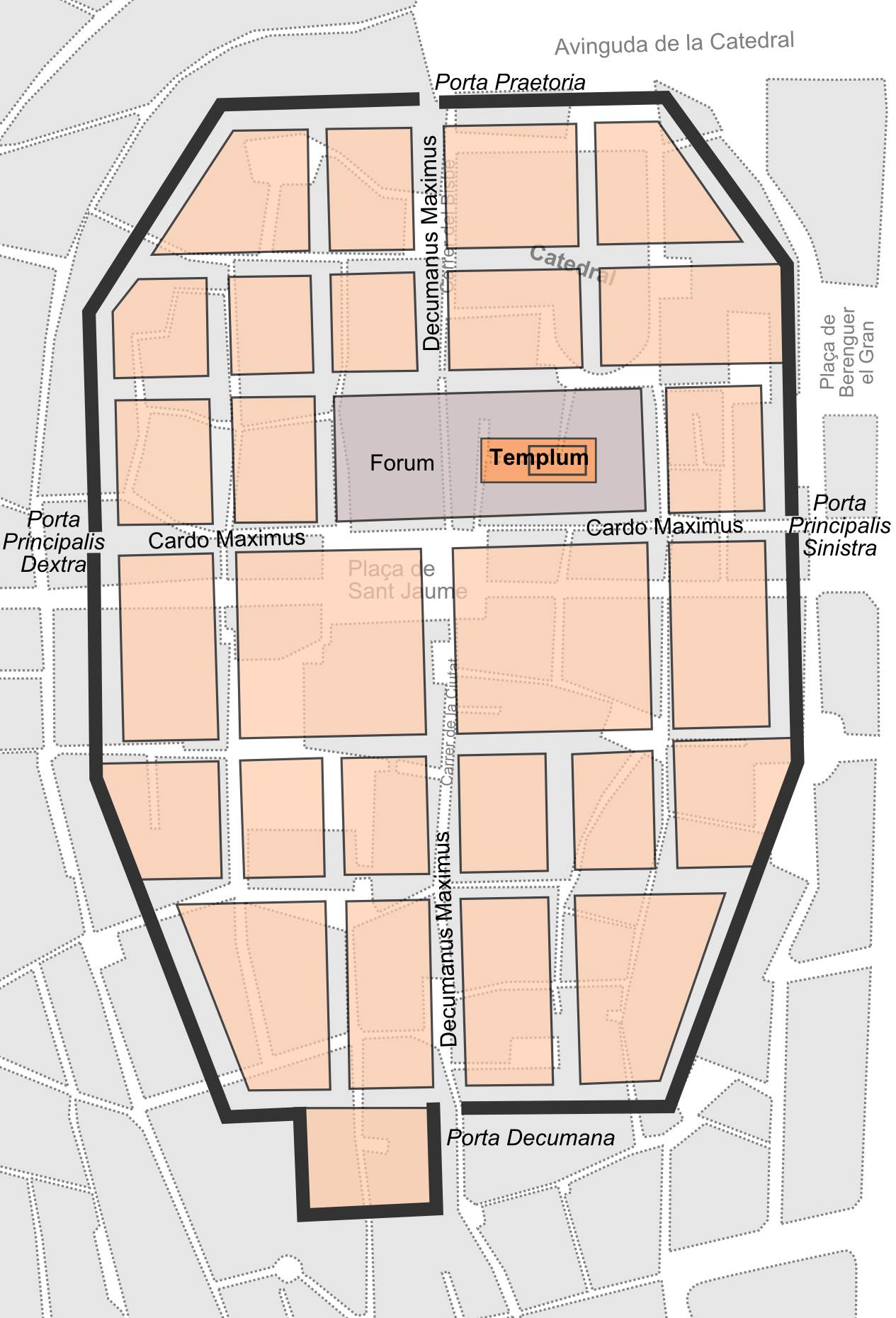
Plan of Barcino superimposed on the current plan of the Gothic Quarter

Barcelona was founded by Roman colonizers in the 1st century BCE with the name of Colonia Iulia Augusta Faventia Paterna Barcino. It was originally a small walled city that initially took the urban form of castrum, and later oppidum, settled on Mount Táber (16.9 masl), a small hill located on the site of the current Plaça Sant Jaume. The maximum splendor of the Roman period was during the second century, with a population that must have ranged between 3500 and 5000 inhabitants.

The center of the city was the forum, the central square dedicated to public life and business. From here, there were two main roads: the cardo maximus, oriented north-south (today's Libretería and Call streets) and the decumanus maximus, oriented east-west (Obispo, Ciudad and Regomir streets), approximately in the center of the walled enclosure.

The Roman origin of the city is present in several streets, all derived from its full Latin name: Via Júlia, from the Julio-Claudian dynasty that ruled the Empire at the time of the founding of the city; Via Augusta, after the Emperor Augustus; Via Favencia, a term derived from the Latin verb faveo ("to favor"), apparently because it was a colony exempt from taxes; and Via Barcino, after the Latin name of the city.

=== Middle Ages ===
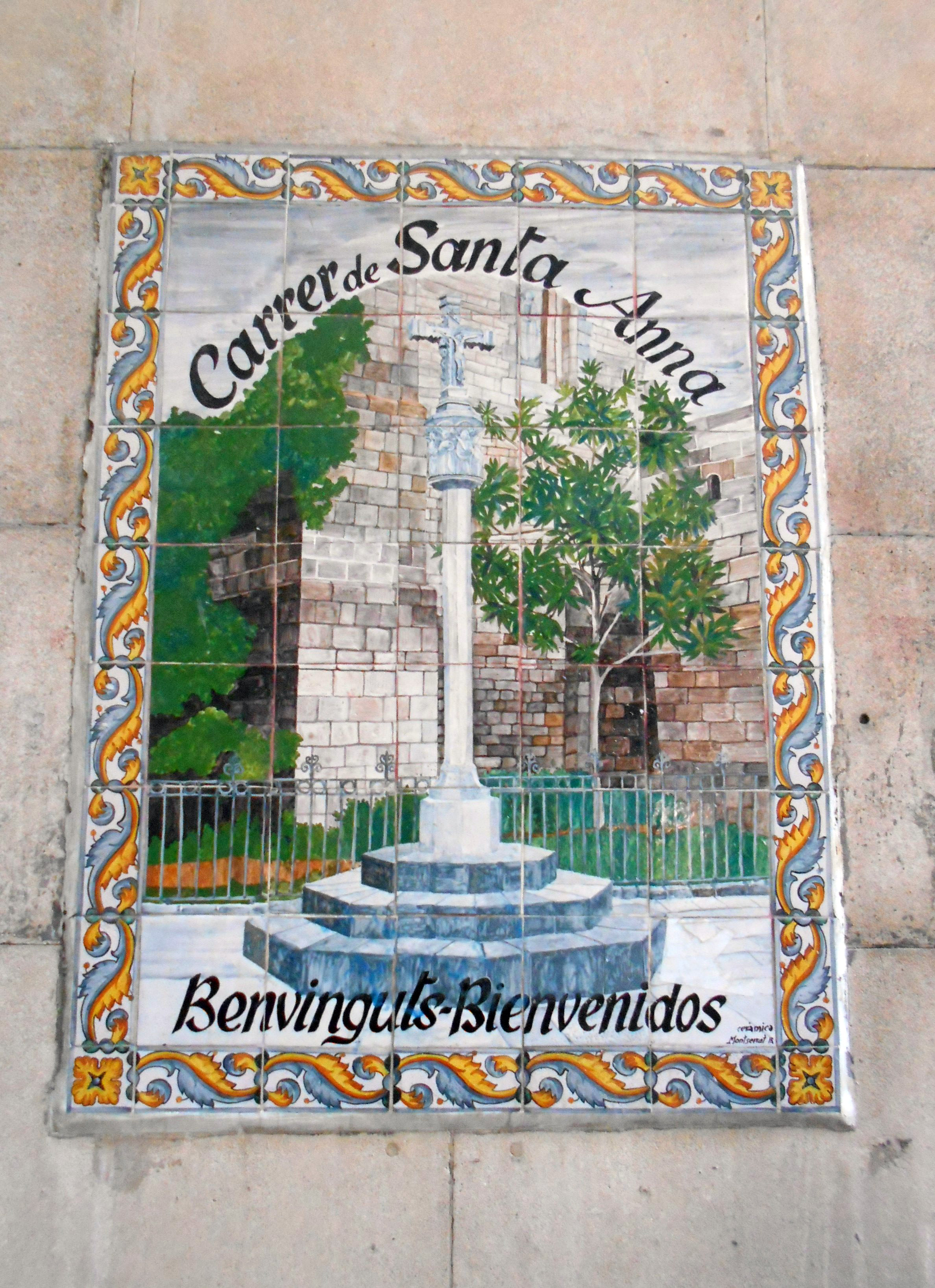
Santa Anna Street.

After the fall of the Roman Empire and until the formation of the Catalan counties, there were several conquests and the passage of successive civilizations, from the Visigoths and the Arabs to a period of integration into the Carolingian Empire. At this time Barcelona was constituted as a county and later became part of the Crown of Aragon, and the political and economic center of the Principality of Catalonia, becoming an important maritime and commercial axis of the Mediterranean Sea. The city grew from the primitive urban nucleus — what is today the Gothic Quarter — and in the 14th century, El Raval district emerged. Barcelona then had about 25,000 inhabitants.

The medieval streets were short and narrow, without any planimetry and laid out at the whim of the landowners. The first known names were usually toponymic in nature, referring to features of the terrain or some kind of geographical feature: streets such as Arenas, Cantos, Arcs, Arcs de Junqueras, Balsas de Sant Pere or Rec. Many others referred to water wells, such as the streets Pou de la Cadena, Pou de la Figuera, Pou de l'Estany and Pou Dolç.

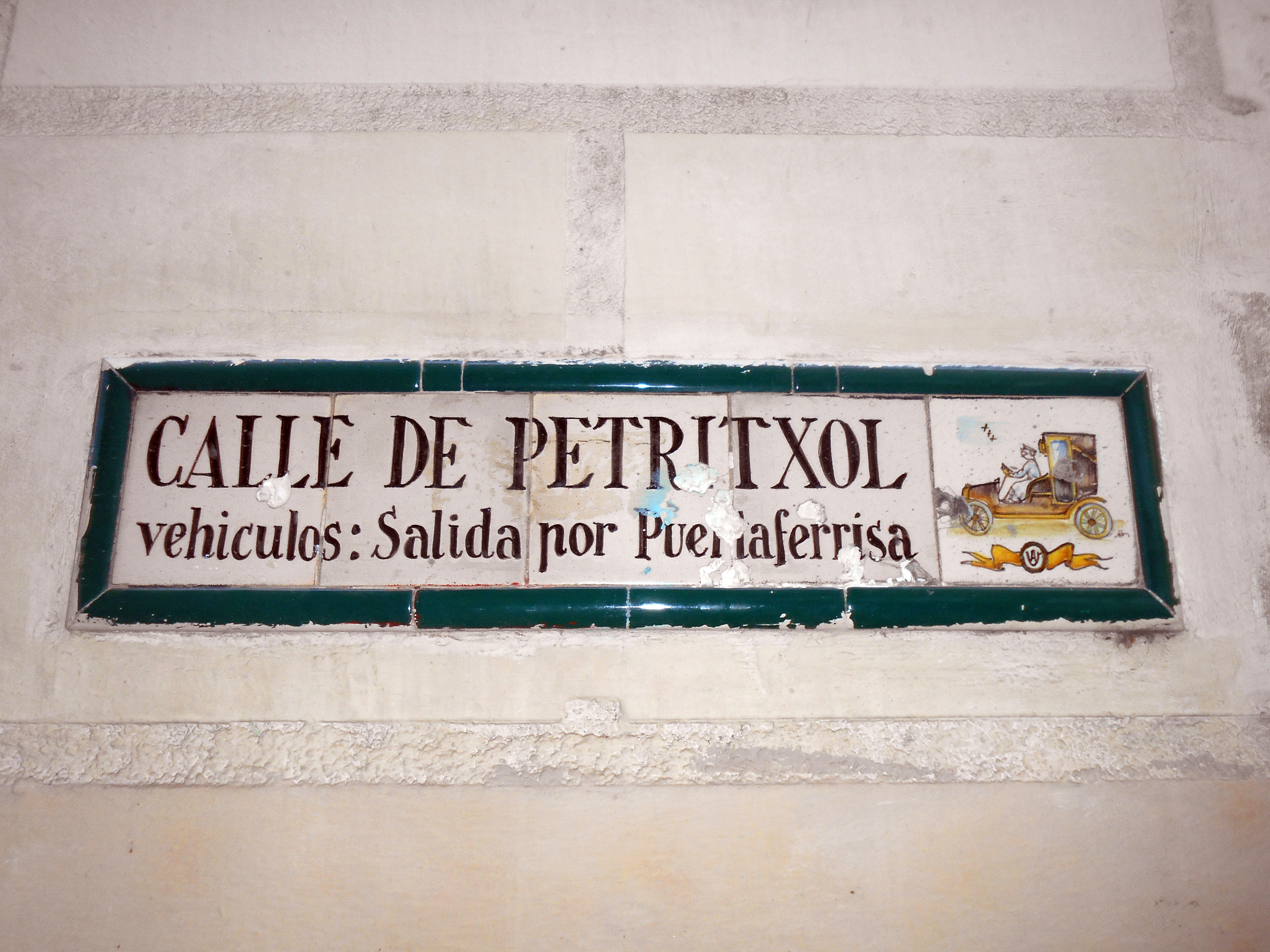
Petritxol Street.

In a following phase, several streets were named with anthroponyms, names or surnames of characters or families, generally landowners. Some examples are Amargós, Avinyó, Bellafila, Bertrellans, Caçador, Copons, Esquirol, Estruc, Ferlandina, Fonollar, Lledó, Marquet, Mònec, Montcada, Montjuïc -from which Montjuïc del Carme and Montjuïc del Bisbe are derived-, Petritxol, Picalquers, Regomir, Requesens, Robador, Serra or Tarròs streets.

Numerous streets were also baptized with religious names, either saints (hagiotoponyms) or invocations from convents and monasteries; some examples would be: Sant Antoni Abat, Sant Pau, Sant Oleguer, Santa Madrona, Sant Agustí, Santa Mònica, Sant Pacià, Santa Eulàlia, Sant Sever, Bonsuccés, Sant Honorat, Sant Miquel, Ave Maria, Trinitat, Sant Francesc, Mercè, Santa Llúcia, Valldonzella, Santa Catalina, Montalegre, Sant Cugat, Egipcíaques, Sant Vicenç, Carme, Pey de la Crer, Elisabets, Santa Anna, Jerusalem, Magdalenes, Sant Pere (Alta, Baixa and Mitjana), Montsió, etc.

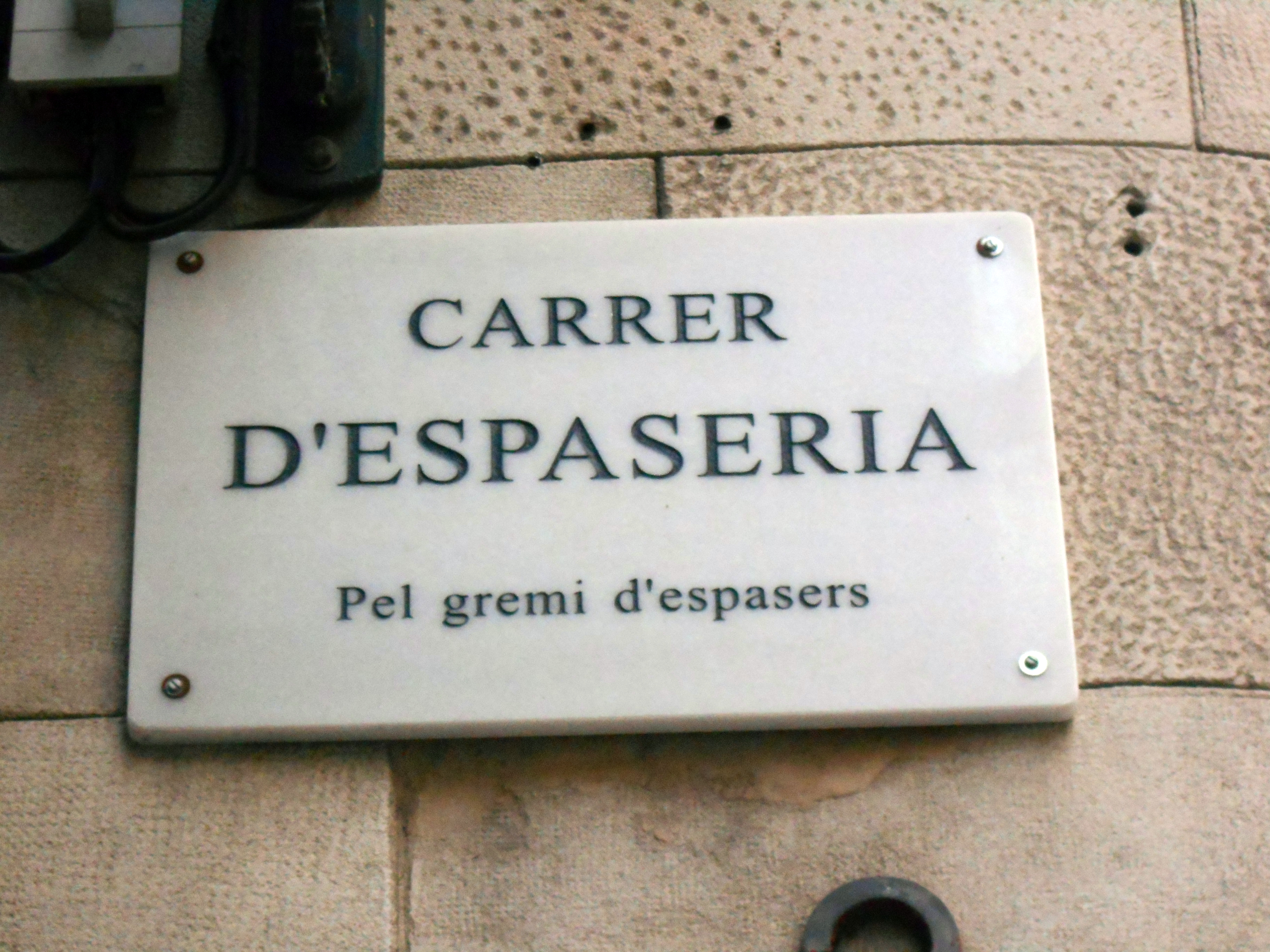
Espaseria Street, by the Swordsmiths' Guild.

Another large number of streets come from trades and guilds, which used to be grouped by zones. The streets Abaixadors ("shearers"), Agullers ("hole makers"), Argenteria ("silversmiths"), Assaonadors ("shellers"), Boters ("coopers"), Brocaters ("brocateros"), Canvis Vells and Canvis Nous ("cambistas"), Carders ("carders"), Corders ("corders"), Cotoners ("cotoners"), Dagueria ("cutlers"), Escudellers ("potters"), Esparteria ("esparteria"), Espaseria ("sword making"), Flassaders ("manteros"), Freneria ("frenería"), Mercaders ("mercaders"), Mirallers ("mirror makers"), Tallers ("cutters"), Tapineria ("tapineria"), Traginers ("muleteers") and Vidrieria ("glass makers").

Some streets also used to be named for the presence of singular buildings (Palace, Cathedral) or various establishments (Hospital, New Baths). Tradition has it that the name Carassa Street comes from a carota on the corner between this street and Mirallers Street, which announced a nearby brothel.

During medieval times Barcelona had a Jewish quarter, the Call, located between the current streets of Fernando, Banys Nous, Palla, and Bisbe. Founded in 692, it survived until its destruction in 1391 in a xenophobic assault. It was separated from the rest of the city by a wall, and it had two synagogues (Mayor, now a museum, and Menor, today the parish of Sant Jaume), baths, schools and hospitals. Its memory lives on in the streets of Call and Arc de Sant Ramon del Call.

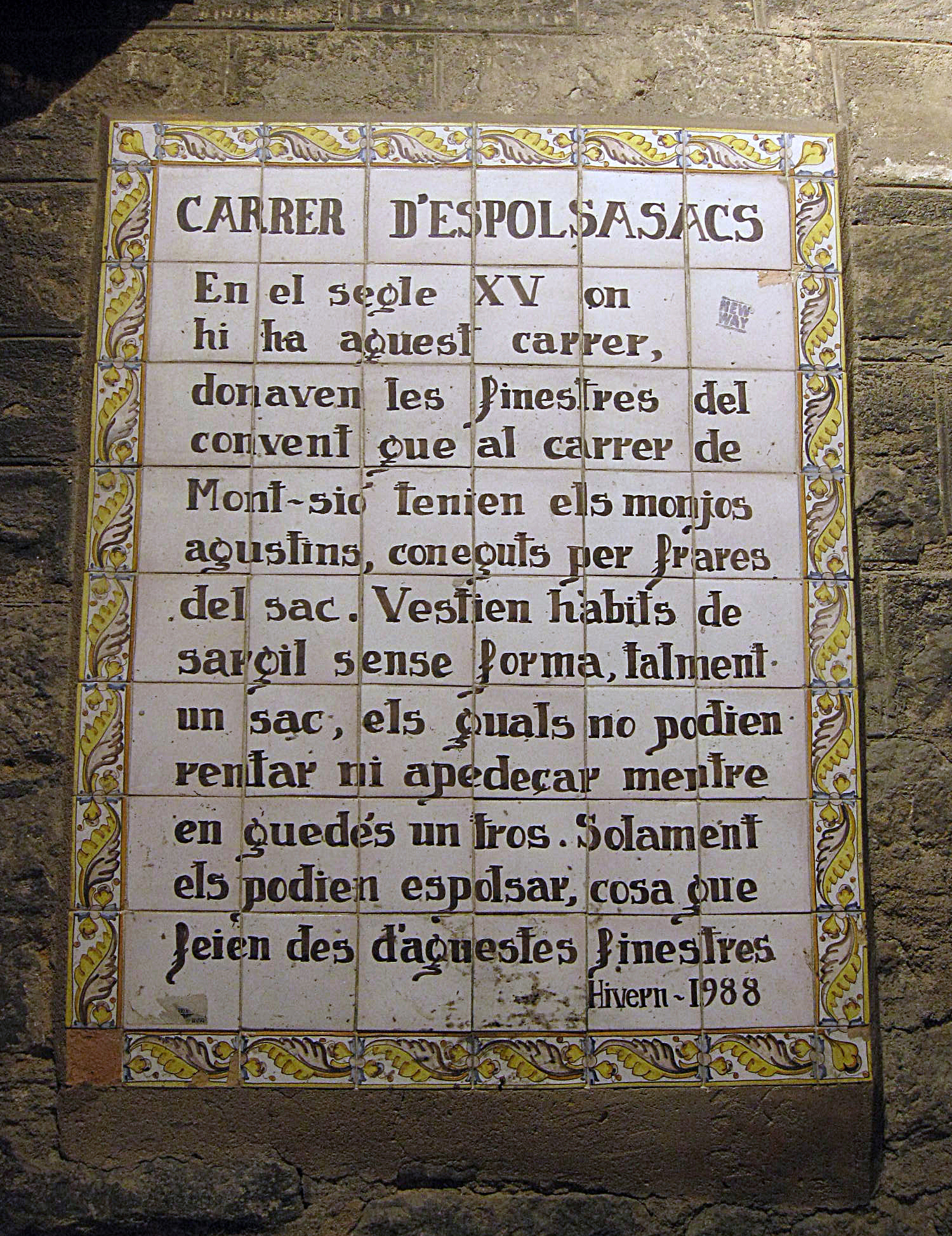
Espolsa-sacs Street ("dust bags"). The name comes from the friars of the Congregation of the Penitence of Our Lord Jesus Christ, who wore sacks, which they cleaned in this alley.

Over time, the first settlements outside the city walls began to appear. Various population centers (vila nova) were created, generally around churches and monasteries: this was the case around the church of Santa Maria del Mar, where a neighborhood of port character was created; likewise around the church of San Cucufate del Riego, of agrarian character; the neighborhood of Sant Pere around Sant Pere de les Puel·les; the neighborhood of El Pi arose around the church of Santa Maria del Pi; that of Santa Anna next to the church of the same name; the neighborhood of Arcs settled around the Portal del Bisbe; and the Mercadal, around the market of Portal Major. El Raval neighborhood ("slum") was also gradually formed, initially a suburb populated by orchards and some religious buildings.

The creation of these new neighborhoods made it necessary to expand the walled perimeter, so in 1260 a new wall was built from Sant Pere de las Puel·les to the Drassanes, facing the sea. The enclosure had eight new gates, some of which gave their name to various enclaves of the city that still remain: the Portal de l'Àngel, which gave its name to an avenue; the Portaferrisa, whose name is on a street; or La Boqueria, remembered in a street and a square, as well as a market.

In the 13th century, Carrer Ample was opened, connecting Santa Maria del Mar with Framenors. It was once the widest street in the city, hence its name, and was the residence of wealthy families who built numerous palaces there.

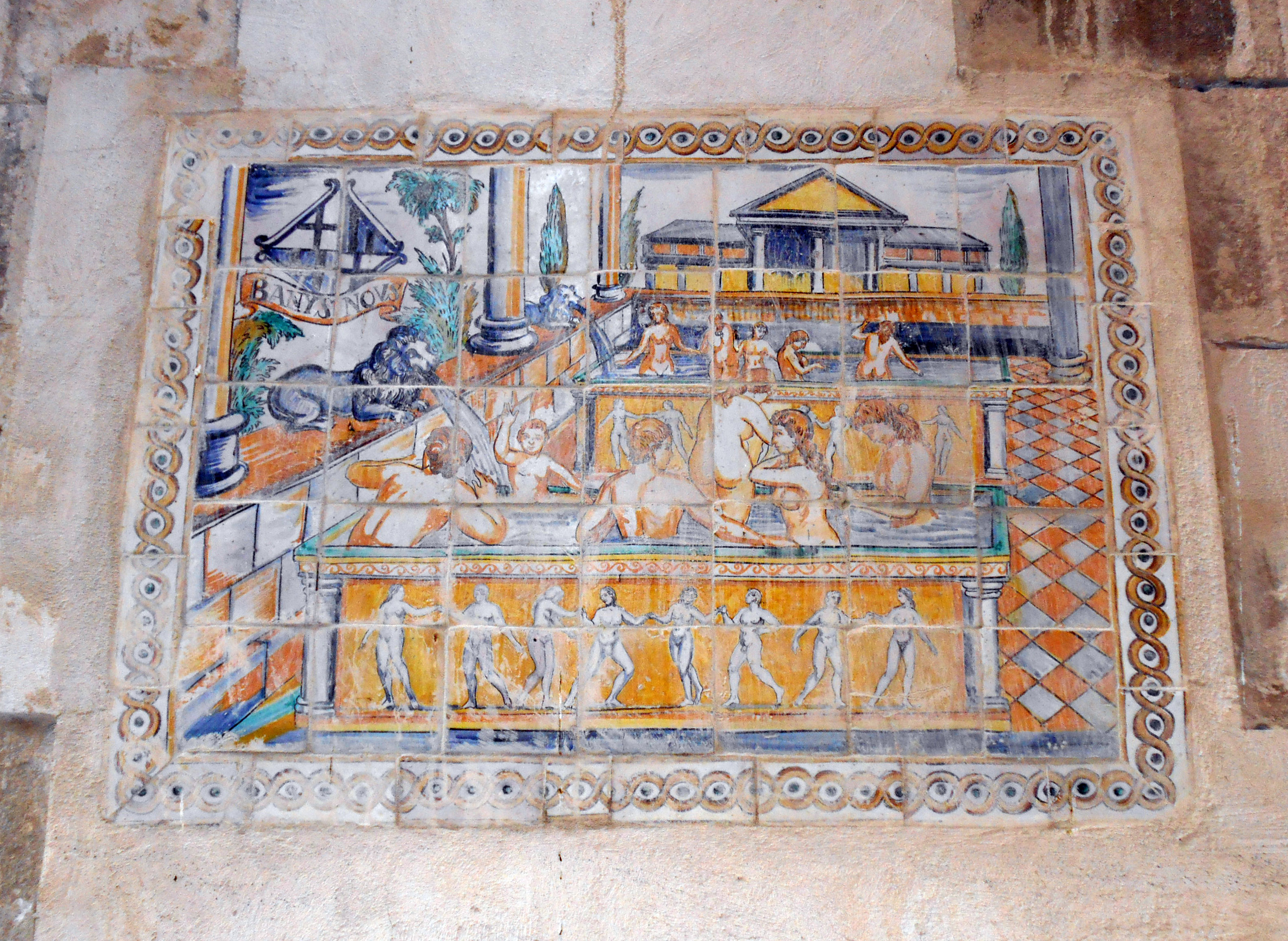
Banys Nous Street.

In 1355 an urban reform took place in front of the Bisbal Gate of the wall, whereby several houses were demolished to channel the waters of the Collserola mountain range to the Plaça Sant Jaume, giving rise to a square that was called Plaça Nova.

On the other hand, in 1389 the so-called Porxo del Forment ("porch of wheat") was located on a beach area left by the former islets of Maians and Puig de les Falzies, which would later become a large square, the Pla de Palau, so called because the Viceroy's palace was located there. The Pla de Palau was the nerve center of Barcelona between the eighteenth and nineteenth centuries, when it was replaced by the Plaça de Catalunya.

At the end of the 14th century, the Plaça del Rei was opened, which until then had been a corral and straw and fodder market. Its name comes from being located next to the Palau Reial Major, the residence in Barcelona of the kings of the Crown of Aragon.

It is worth noting that during the Middle Ages an extensive network of roads emerged in the plain of Barcelona that connected the city with the various suburbs and villages in the vicinity, as well as other points of interest: farmhouses (Melina tower road), mills (Verneda road), quarries (Creu dels Molers road), bleaching meadows (Teulat road), churches or chapels (Sant Llàtzer road), fountains (Font dels Ocellets road), etc.

Finally, it is also worth noting a privilege that the city could grant during this period to other localities by which they came to be considered as "streets" of Barcelona, and thus came under the institutional protection of the city: the carreratge. In these cases, the jurisdiction of these localities was shared between the city and the monarch: the former maintained the ownership, and the latter the usufruct. Barcelona came to have 74 localities considered as streets, among them: Igualada, Cardedeu, Vilamajor, Llissá de Munt, L'Ametlla, Sant Feliu de Codines, Mollet del Vallès, Cerdanyola del Vallès, Granollers, Caldes de Montbui, Montmeló, Sant Cugat del Vallès, Santa Perpètua de Mogoda, Vallvidrera, Martorell, Molins de Rei, Olesa de Montserrat, Mataró, Vilasar de Dalt, Argentona, Premiá de Mar, Vilanova i la Geltrú, Moià, Palamós, Sant Sadurní d'Anoia, Ripoll, and Cambrils.

=== Early modern age ===
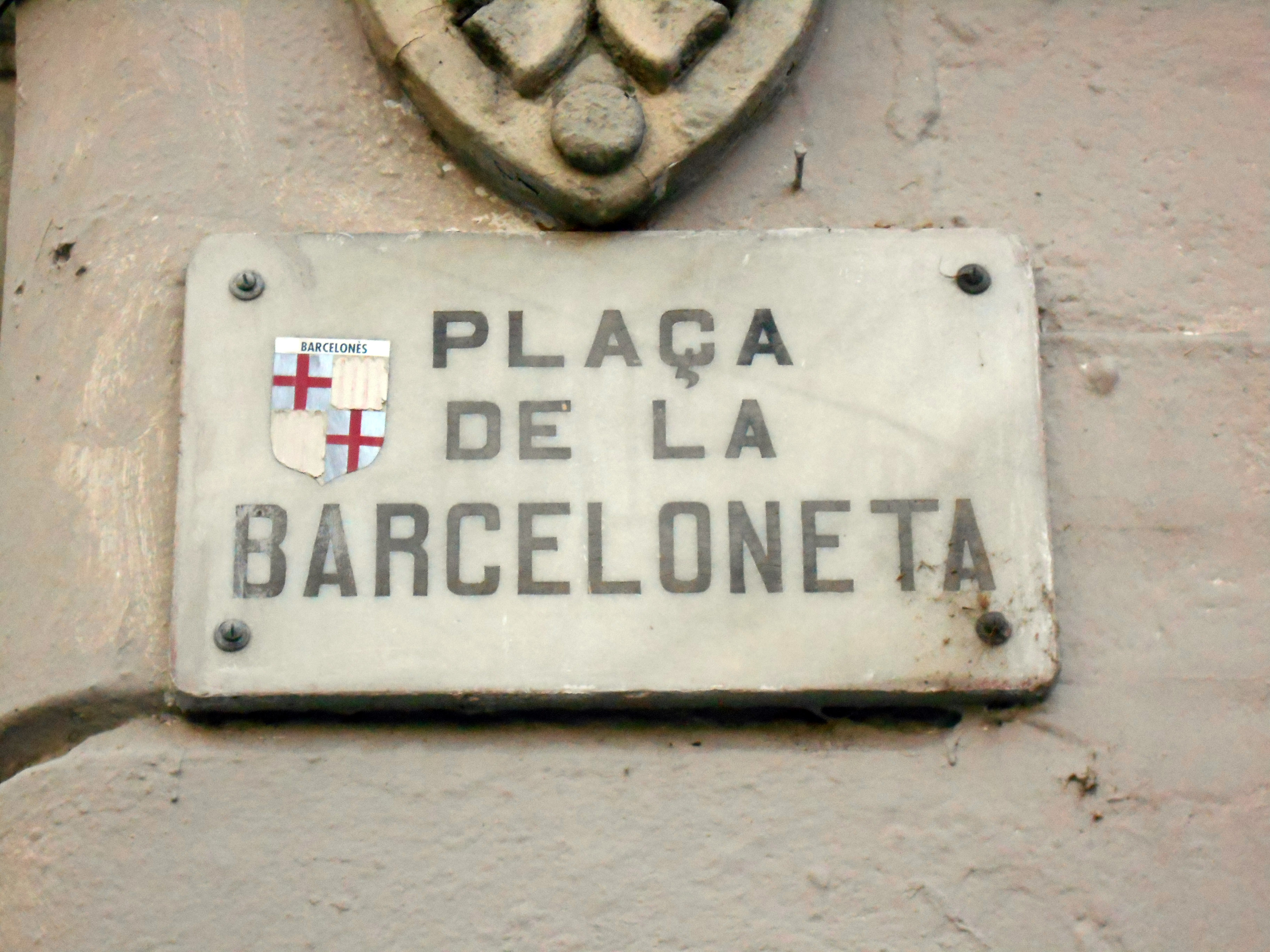
La Barceloneta Square.

In this period Barcelona became part of the Hispanic Monarchy, which arose from the union of the crowns of Castile and Aragon. It was a time of alternation between periods of prosperity and economic crisis, especially due to plague epidemics in the 16th century and social and military conflicts such as the Reapers' War and the War of Succession between the 17th and 18th centuries, although in the latter century the economy rebounded thanks to the opening of trade with America and the beginning of the textile industry. The city was still confined within its walls – the only expansion was on the beach, in the neighborhood of La Barceloneta — despite the fact that by the end of the period it had almost 100,000 inhabitants.

This period was not one of excessive urban reforms, since the loss of Barcelona's capital status led to a decrease in large-scale projects. In the first half of the 16th century, the sea wall was built, where the bastions of Llevant, Torre Nova, Sant Ramon and Migdia were placed. The port was also reformed, and the seafront between the Pla de Palau and La Rambla was embanked, which led to the development of the Passeig del Mar, now known as the Passeig de Colom, in honor of Christopher Columbus.

Otherwise, the main urban reform in that century was in the area around the cathedral, where the Plaça de Crist Rei (now the Plaça de la Seu) was opened, in front of the main portal of the cathedral (1546), as well as the Plaça de San Iu, with a space cut out of the Royal Palace.

In the 17th century, the city wall was extended again with the construction of five new gates: Sant Sever, Tallers, Sant Antoni, Sant Pau and Santa Madrona. Two new roads were also built that crossed the plain of Barcelona: the Mataró road — coinciding with the current Pere IV street — and the Creu Coberta road, which connected with the Madrid road -current Hostafrancs and Sants streets-.

In 1753, the construction of La Barceloneta neighborhood began on the initiative of the Marquis de la Mina. Located on a small peninsula of land reclaimed from the sea, its layout was designed by the engineer Pedro Martín Cermeño, with a grid of orthogonal streets and blocks of houses with elongated floor plans, a clear example of academic Baroque urban planning. The name of the neighborhood appears in a square, a promenade, a park, a beach and a pier. The rest of the streets have received different names, preferably related to the sea, such as the street and square of the Sea, or the streets of the Mediterranean, Sailors and Fishermen; also several sailors, admirals and discoverers: Pinzón Brothers, Pizarro, Balboa, Andrea Doria, Admiral Aixada, Admiral Cervera, Admiral Churruca, Admiral Barceló and Berenguer Mallol.

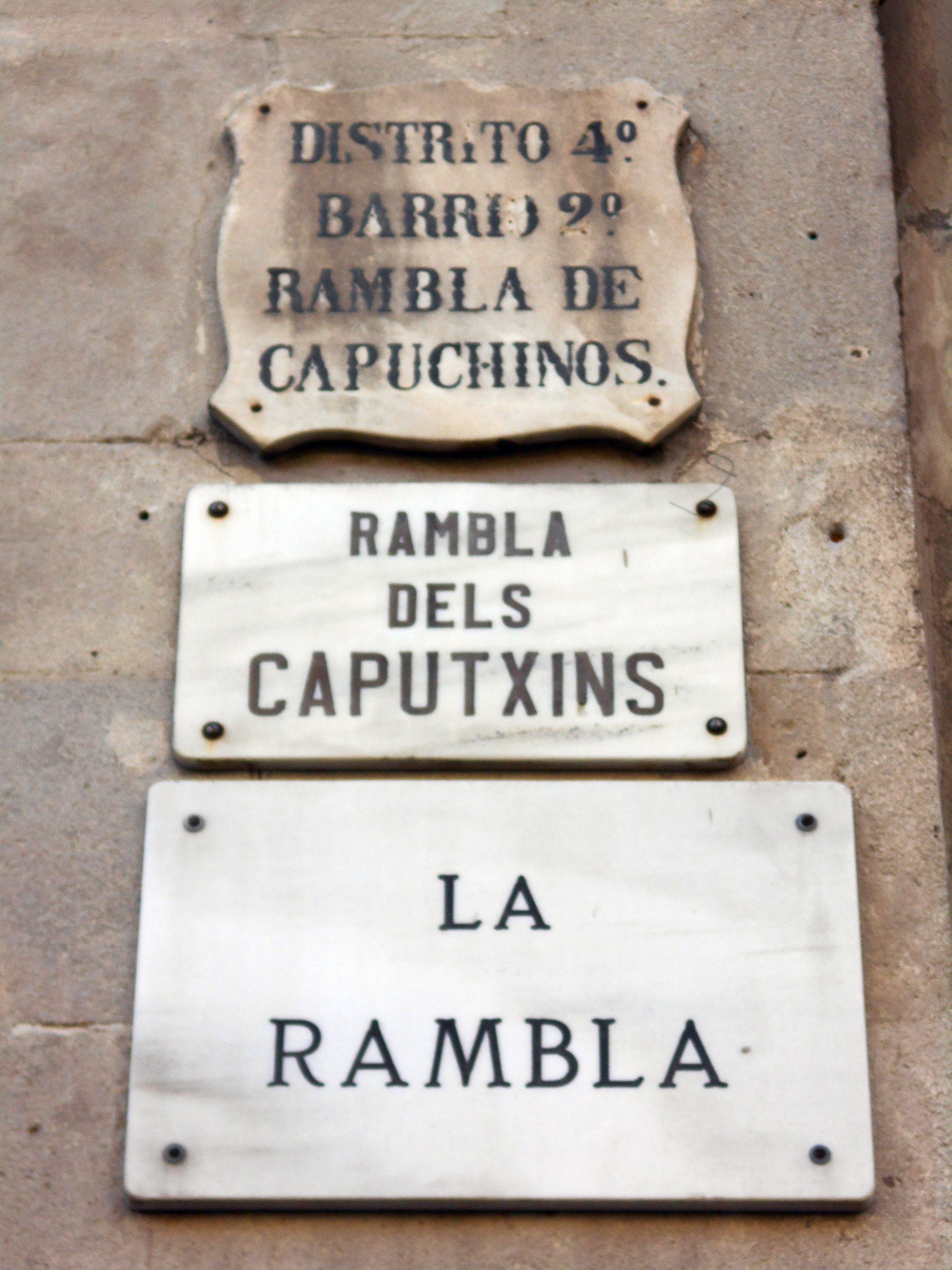
On the Rambla there are usually two plaques: one for the generic name of the avenue, and another for each of its sections.

Between 1776 and 1778 the urbanization of la Rambla was carried out, an ancient torrent that during the Middle Ages marked the western boundary of the city, which had been populated since the 16th century, mainly by theaters and convents. At this time the inner wall was demolished, the buildings were realigned and a new landscaped promenade was designed, in the style of the French boulevard. La Rambla has different names for each of its sections, so it is also often referred to in the plural, Les Rambles. From the Plaça de Catalunya to the Portal de la Pau, it is called: Rambla de Canaletes, after the water pipes of the Sant Sever reservoir; dels Estudis, after the old university or Estudi General; de Sant Josep, after the Carmelite convent of Sant Josep, located on the present site of the Boquería market; dels Caputxins, after the convent of the Capuchins of Santa Madrona, which was in the area of the present Plaça Reial; and de Santa Mònica, after the church of the same name. The term rambla comes from the Arabic ramla (رملة), which means "sandbank" — or intermittent watercourse — and has since been used as a generic for numerous thoroughfares in the city: Badal, Brasil, Caçador, Carmel, Catalunya, Fabra i Puig, Guipúscoa, Mar, Onze de Setembre, Poblenou, Prat, Prim, Raval and Volart.

Around the same time as La Rambla, the promenades of Sant Joan and Gràcia were planned, although they were not built until the turn of the century for the former and 1820–1827 for the latter. The first was named after the apostle John the Evangelist, and the second for being the access road to the town of Gràcia — formerly known as the road of Jesús.

Between 1778 and 1789, Count del Asalto Street was laid out — currently Nueva de la Rambla Street — which was named after Francisco González de Bassecourt, Captain General of Catalonia, who had the initiative to create the street. He was the first exponent of the dedication of a street to a particular character, thus beginning a custom that has lasted until today.

In 1797 the Passeig Nou (or Paseo de la Explanada) was also created, located next to the military Citadel, a wide avenue lined with poplars and elms and decorated with ornamental fountains, which for a time was the main green space of the city, but disappeared in the urbanization works of the Parc de la Ciutadella.

In 1771 the Edicto de obreria was approved, a municipal ordinance aimed at controlling private works in the city, which involved the regulation of the alignment of houses according to the layout of the streets, as well as the supervision of aspects such as the paving of the streets, the sewage system and the numbering of the houses.

=== 19th century ===
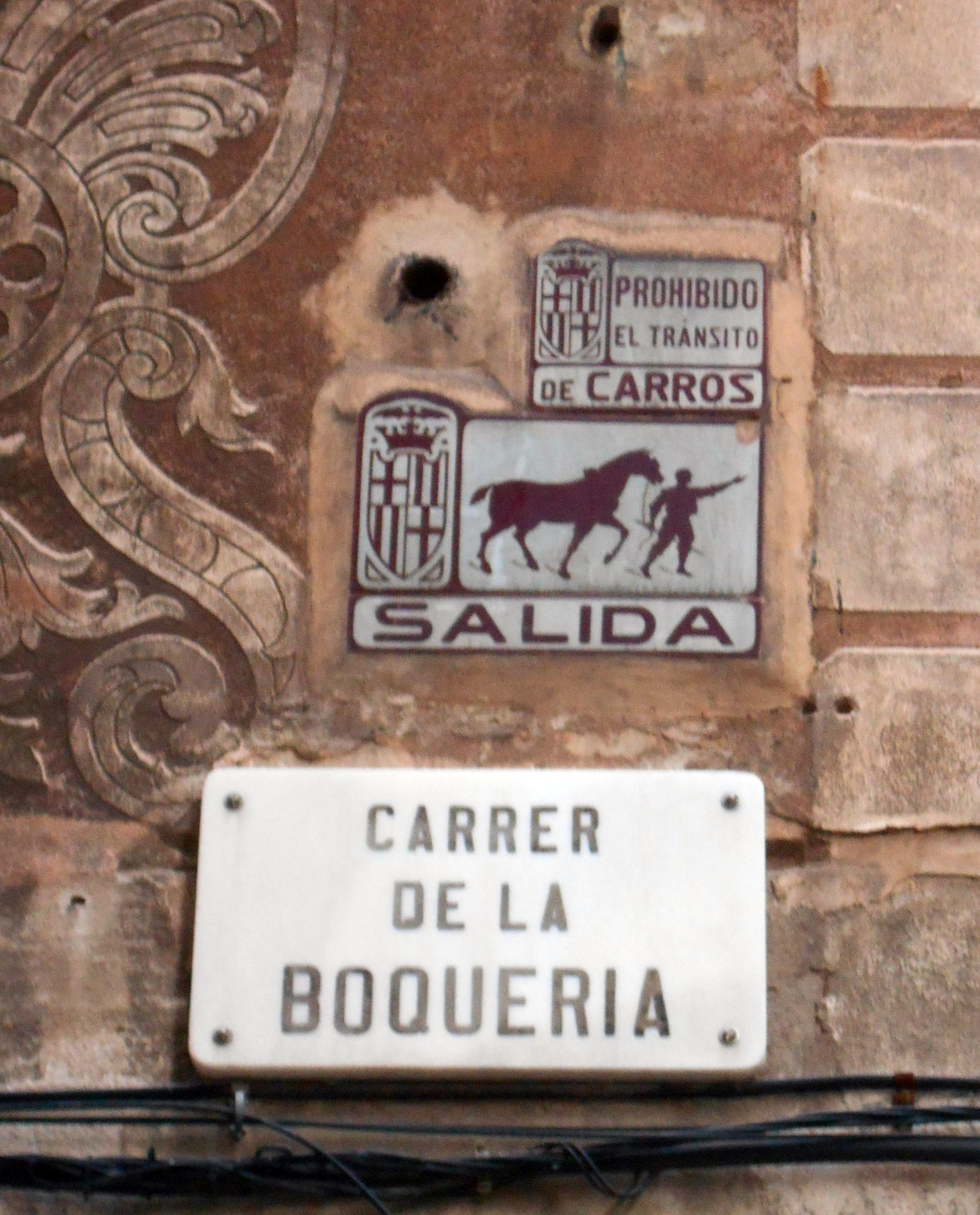
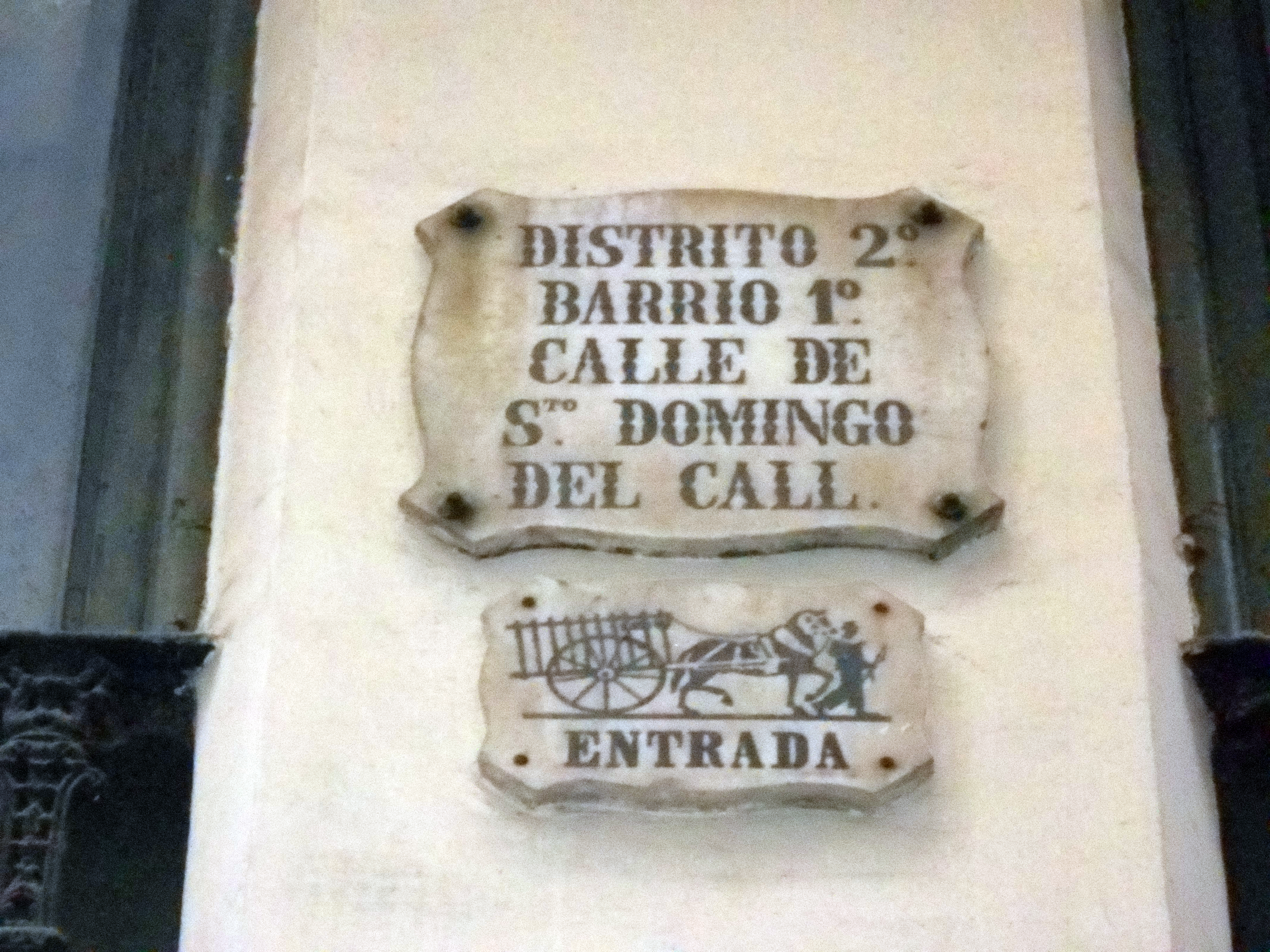
In the 19th century, one-way signs were put up on some streets of Ciutat Vella to manage the traffic of carts and animals.

In this period there was a great economic revitalization, linked to the Industrial Revolution — especially the textile industry — which in turn led to a cultural renaissance. Between 1854 and 1859, the city walls were demolished, allowing the city to expand, which was the reason for the Eixample project, drawn up by Ildefons Cerdà in 1859. Likewise, thanks to the revolution of 1868, the demolition of the Citadel was achieved, whose land was transformed into a public park. The population grew, especially thanks to immigration from the rest of Spain, reaching 400,000 inhabitants by the end of the century.

This century was one of constant political changes and struggles between liberals and conservatives, which was often reflected in the gazetteer. The first political moment in which there was a dance of names was during the Liberal Triennium (1820–1823), although it was only reflected in three names: Pla de Palau became Plaza de la Constitución (Constitution Square), Plaza de San Jaime became Plaza de la Soberanía Nacional (State Sovereignty Square), and Plaza de San Agustín became Plaza de la Igualdad (Equality Square). The first two recovered their names after the triennium — with a brief period in which Pla de Palau was called Plaça dels Cercs (1823–1825) — but the third remained until the Franco dictatorship.

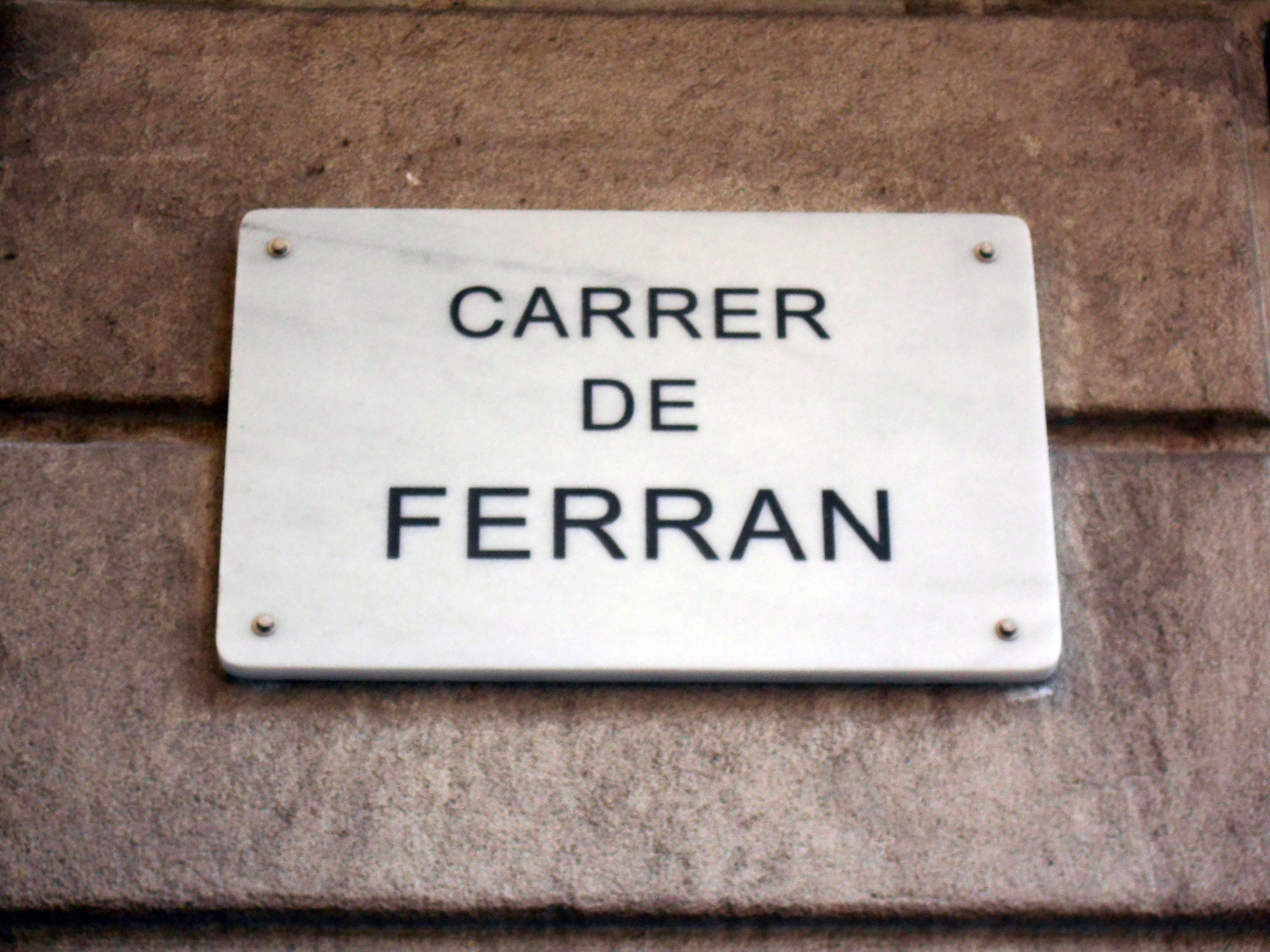
Ferran Street.

Among the main urbanistic actions of these years was the opening of Ferdinand VII street in 1827 — nowadays called only Ferdinand (Ferran in Catalan) — between La Rambla and the Plaça de Sant Jaume, dedicated to the then Spanish monarch. For some years it alternated its name with that of Duque de la Victoria — the title of General Espartero — according to the political color of the moment: King Ferdinand for the conservatives, the general's for the liberal periods (1840 and 1854). This street later had a continuation towards Borne with the streets of Jaime I (1849–53) — for the king of Aragon — and of the Princess (1853) — for Isabel, princess of Asturias. On the other hand, with the end of the Inquisition in 1835, the street that bore that name was changed to Count of Barcelona.

Another factor that favored the urban planning of these years was the massive land confiscation of 1836, which left numerous plots of land that were built on or converted into public spaces, such as La Boquería and Santa Catalina markets, the Gran Teatro del Liceo and two squares designed by Francesc Daniel Molina i Casamajó: Plaça Reial (1848) and Plaça del Duc de Medinaceli; the former was named after the monument it was to contain dedicated to Ferdinand the Catholic — now disappeared — and the latter after Luis de la Cerda y de la Vega, Duke of Medinaceli.

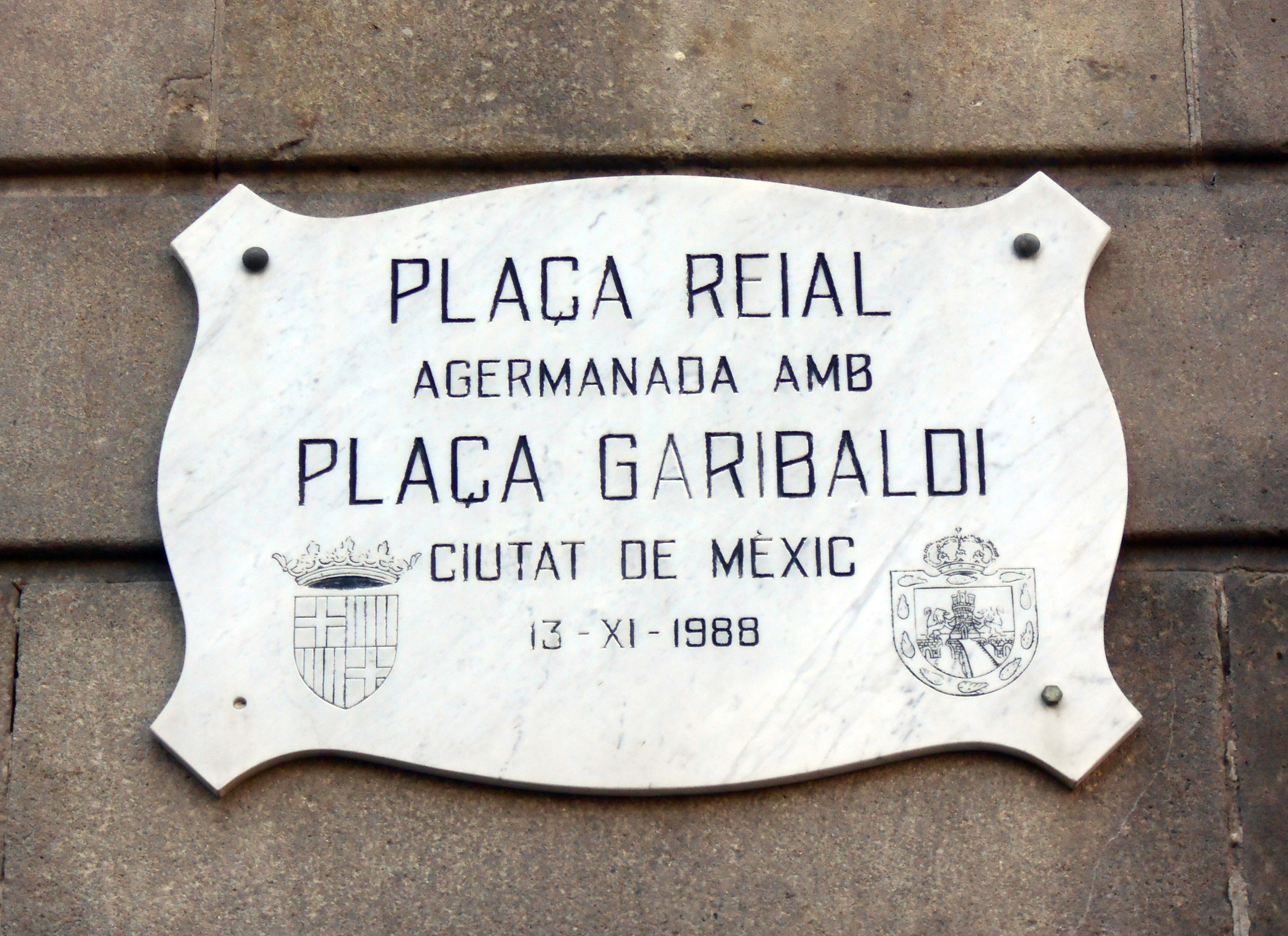
Plaça Reial, since 1988 twinned with Plaza Garibaldi in Mexico City.

Likewise, the new sanitary dispositions promulgated at this time meant the disappearance of numerous parish cemeteries, whose plots were urbanized as new public squares: Thus arose squares such as Santa María (for the church of Santa María del Mar), del Pino (for the church of Santa María del Pino), San José Oriol — located next to the previous one —, San Felipe Neri (for the church of the same name), San Justo (for the church of the same name), San Pedro (for the monastery of Sant Pere de les Puel·les) and San Jaime (for the disappeared church dedicated to the apostle).

The liberal government of 1840 brought about the change of name of the Plaza de San Jaime to Plaza de la Constitución, taking advantage of the end of the rehabilitation works of the square and the City Hall. It bore this name until the beginning of the Second Republic in 1931, when it was changed to Plaça de la República, while in 1940 it was returned to its former name of Plaza de San Jaime.

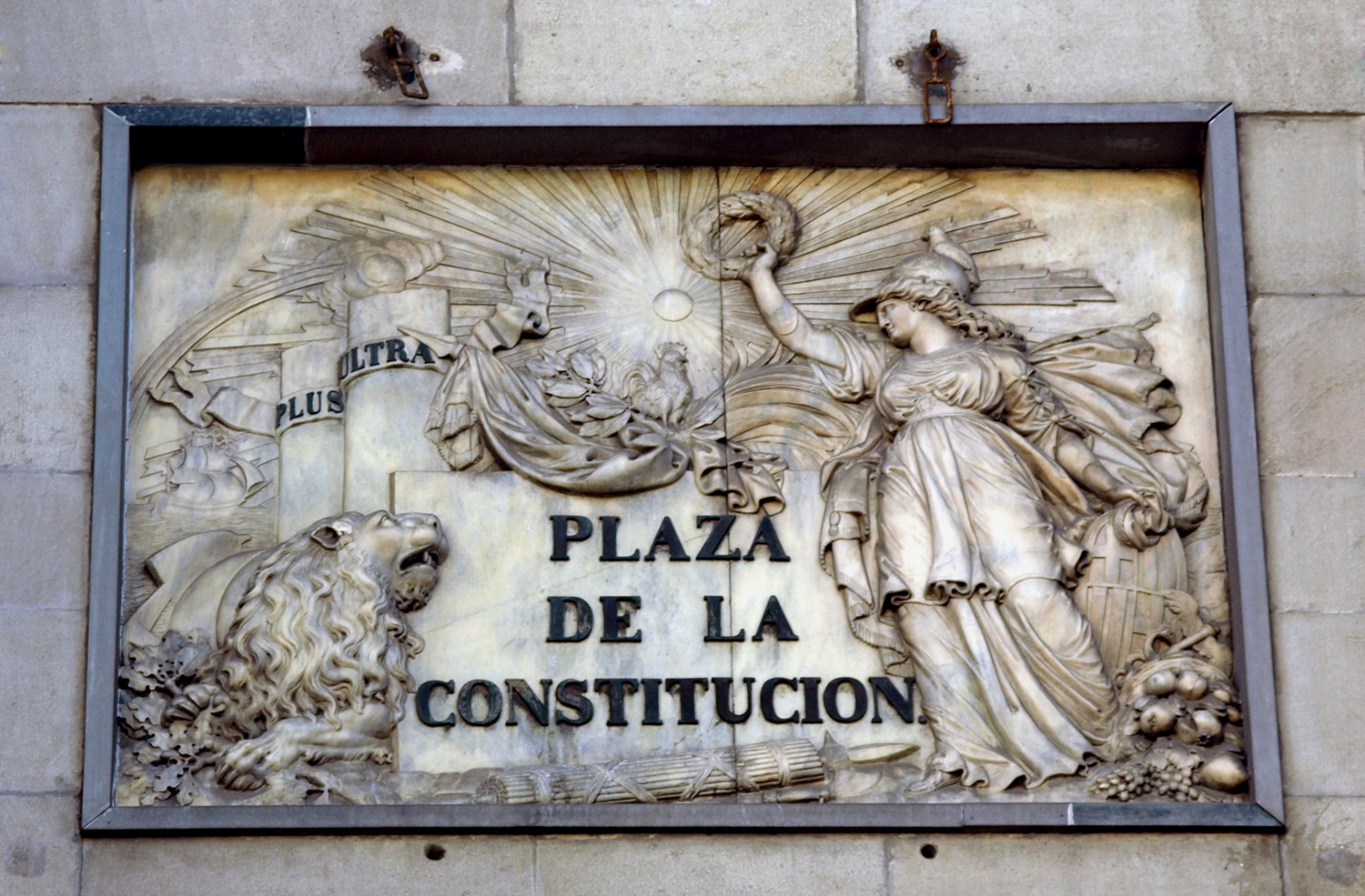
Plaça de Sant Jaume was called Plaza de la Constitución between 1840 and 1931. This plaque, the work of Celdoni Guixà, was located on the facade of the Barcelona City Hall, until it was removed in 2013.

In 1842 began the labeling of the streets with marble plaques and cast lead letters. The origin of this campaign can be found in the bombardment of the city by General Espartero and the subsequent fine of 12 million reales that he imposed on the people of Barcelona, which led many citizens to erase the names and numbers of the streets — until then simply painted on the walls — so as not to be located. This led to the regulation of the street nomenclature, with a system very similar to the one used today.

Around 1850 a sector of the village of Gràcia was urbanized and its owner, Josep Rossell i Imbert, a jeweler by profession, baptized the streets with names related to jewelry: Diamond, Gold, Pearl, Ruby and Topaz.

In the middle of the century, the Diputation of Barcelona was in charge of establishing new road layouts in the plain of Barcelona: the Sarrià road —currently Sarrià Avenue — designed by Ildefons Cerdà and built between 1850 and 1853; the road from Sants to Les Corts (1865–1867); and the road from Sagrera to Horta (1871), currently Garcilaso Street.

During the Progressive Biennium of 1854–1856 there were again some name changes: Reina Cristina street was renamed General Dulce, and Obispo street was renamed General Zurbano, both liberals. The Plaza de la Unión, so called because of the Liberal Union party, was also created. The first two were later reverted, although the Plaça de la Unió remains.

In 1860 a royal order appeared that obliged the labeling in Spanish:

In capitals and towns where the use of some dialects is still preserved, all street names will be reduced to the Castilian language.

The order was half obeyed, and voices were raised against it, such as that of the historian Andreu Avel·lí Pi i Arimon, who criticized the bad translations made in many cases. On the other hand, many changes were ignored by the common people, who continued to call their streets by their traditional names: thus, the street of Arco del Teatro was still known as Trentaclaus 25 years after its change, since the popular name appeared in parentheses in its entry in the 1879 Guía de Divisiones de Barcelona

==== Eixample of Barcelona ====
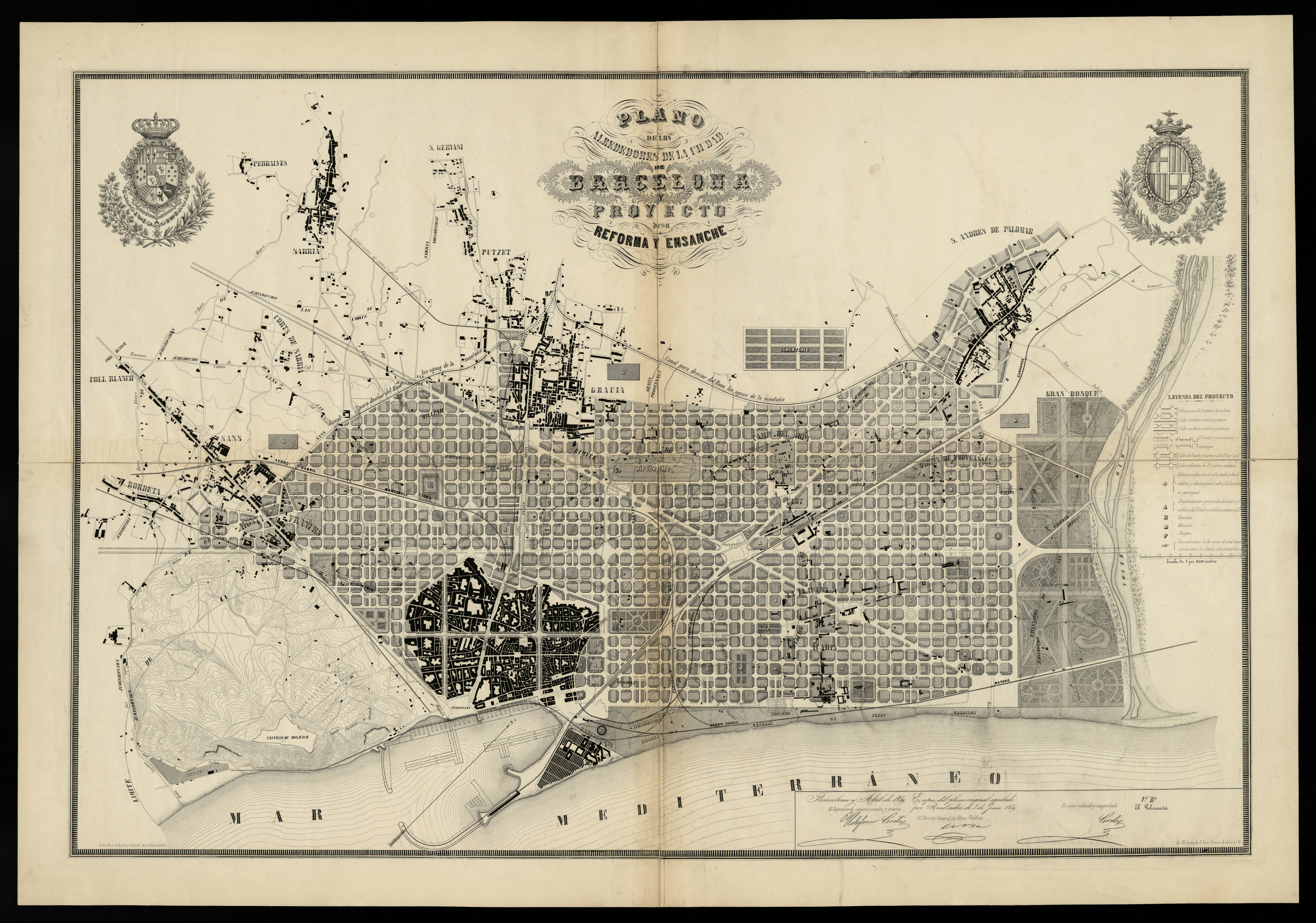
Plan of the surrounding area of the city of Barcelona and of the project for its improvement and enlargement, by Ildefons Cerdà (1859).

Thanks to the demolition of the medieval walls in 1854, the city was able to expand on the adjacent plain. In 1859 the City Council appointed a commission to promote a competition for enlargement (eixample) projects, which was won by Antoni Rovira i Trias; however, the Ministry of Development intervened and imposed the project of Ildefonso Cerdá, author of a topographical plan of the Barcelona plain and a demographic and urbanistic study of the city (1855). The Cerdá Plan (Plan de los alrededores de la ciudad de Barcelona y del proyecto para su mejora y ampliación, 1859) instituted an orthogonal layout between Montjuïc and the Besós river, with a system of rectilinear streets oriented northwest-southeast, 20 m wide, cut by others oriented southwest-northeast parallel to the coast and the Collserola mountain range. Thus a series of square blocks of 113.3 m on each side were delimited, of which Cerdá planned to build only two sides and leave the other spaces for gardens, although this point was not fulfilled and finally practically all the buildable land was used; the buildings were designed with an octagonal floor plan characteristic of the Eixample, with chamfers that favored circulation.

The plan foresaw the construction of several main avenues, the future Diagonal (named like that because of its layout), Meridiana, Paralelo, Gran Via de les Corts Catalanes and Passeig de Sant Joan; as well as several large squares at their intersections: Tetuán, e, Espanya, Verdaguer, Doctor Letamendi, Universitat and Urquinaona. It also foresaw the opening of three major avenues in the old part of the city: two that would connect the Eixample with the coast (Muntaner and Pau Claris) and another perpendicular avenue that would connect the Citadel with Montjuïc (Cathedral Avenue, partially completed). It also contemplated a series of new ring roads that would encircle the old city, in the place left by the walls: the ring roads of San Pablo, San Antonio, Universidad and San Pedro.

The grid of streets designed by Cerdà was initially named by numbers and letters: the numbers corresponded to the streets that went from sea to mountain, and the letters to those in the Llobregat-Besós direction. This alphanumeric system was changed to a nominal one, thanks to a regulation made by the 4th Section of Development of the City Council. The nomination of the new roads was entrusted to the writer Víctor Balaguer, who was mainly inspired by the history of Catalonia, as he stated in his proposal:

According to what is publicly said, the time is approaching to name several of the streets that are to form the new Barcelona, and there is no better occasion than the present to remedy the oblivion in which by bad luck have fallen certain glorious enterprises, certain famous names, which have been, and will always be, of glory for Catalonia.

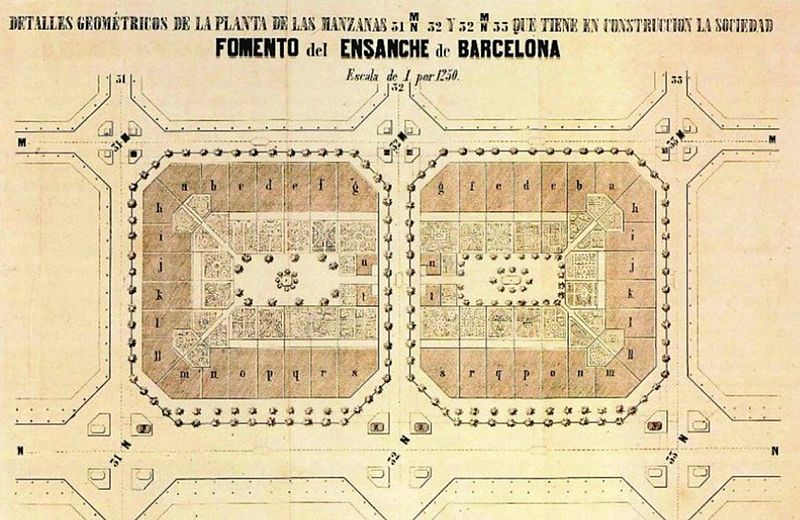
Plan of a set of two blocks of the Cerdà grid taken from a pamphlet published in 1863. It corresponds to the area located between Gran Vía and Diputació, and between Roger de Llúria and Girona, then named with letters and numbers: M and N, 31, 32 and 33.

Influenced by romantic historiography, Balaguer introduced numerous Catalanist names, opening the door for numerous Catalan towns that followed suit. He created several streets named after territories linked to the Crown of Aragon: Valencia, Mallorca, Aragon, Provence, Roussillon, Naples, Calabria, Corsica, Sicily, and Sardinia; institutions such as the General Court of Catalonia, the Catalan Parliament, the Deputation, or the Council of One Hundred; characters from politics, literature or the Catalan arts: Balmes, Aribau, Muntaner, Casanova, Pau Claris, Roger de Flor, Villarroel, Roger de Lauria, Count Borrell, Count of Urgel, Entenza, Ausiàs March, Llull, Llança, Alí Bey, Manso, Pallars, Pujades, Rocafort, Tamarit, Viladomat, Vilanova or Vilamarí; battles and historical events, such as Bailén, Lepanto, Bruc or Caspe. He also dedicated streets to Industry, the Navy and Commerce, and to the Catalan cities of Gerona and Tarragona. There were some modifications to his initial proposal, such as the street of the university, which in 1916 was changed to Enrique Granados after the composer's death; and some names that finally did not materialize, such as Atenas, Desclot, Barceló, Capmany, La Coronela and Llobregat.

On the other hand, and surely to compensate, the municipal corporation and the technical body proposed several names related to the history of Spain, such as Floridablanca, Sepúlveda, Enna (now Ramon Turró Street), Marqués de Campo Sagrado, Pelayo, Vergara and Trafalgar.

The new set of streets was approved by Fomento on December 19, 1863, along with several additional provisions: the territory of the Eixample was divided between Barcelona and the adjoining municipalities (still independent) of Gracia, Les Corts, San Andrés de Palomar and San Martín de Provensals; the numbering of the houses was established; and the labeling was regulated, with a plaque identifying the street on the first building of each block — if it was not built, a provisional tablet was placed.

The part of the Eixample corresponding to Sant Martí de Provençals was not baptized by Balaguer, but rather the Martinese consistory dictated its own names, some of them repeated, such as Balmes (now Fluvià), General Manso (now Josep Pla) and Sant Martí (now Selva de Mar), and some that still survive, such as Prim, Llacuna, Bogatell, Provensals, Pueblo Nuevo and Taulat.

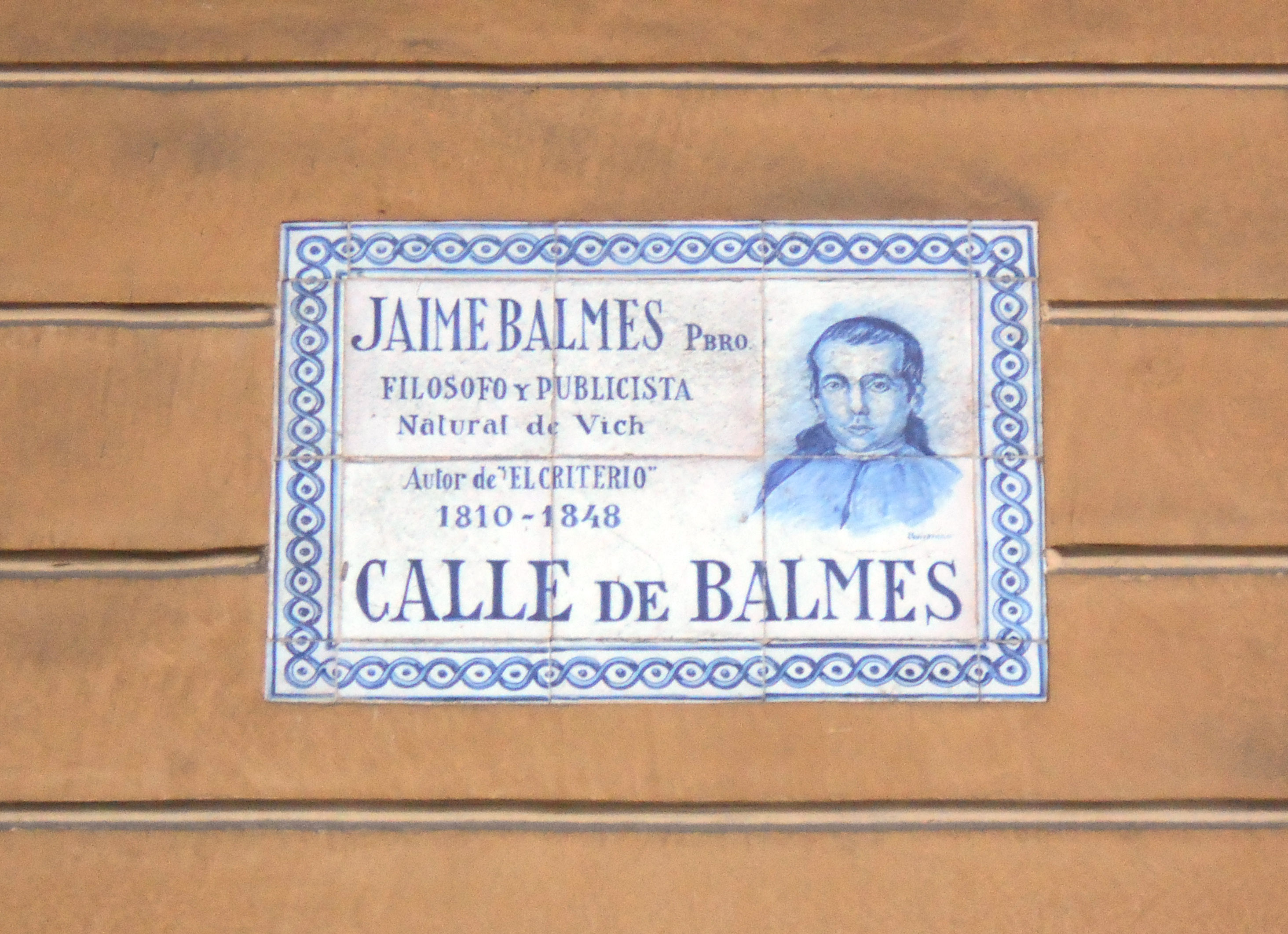
Balmes street.

After Balaguer's proposal, several streets in the Eixample were named after him: Battles and historical events such as Almogávares, Las Navas de Tolosa, Dos de Mayo, Independencia, Los Castillejos, Wad-Ras (now Doctor Trueta) and Luchana (now Roc Boronat); economic concepts such as Labor and Agriculture; characters such as Peter IV, Philip II, Bac de Roda, Padilla, Sancho de Ávila, John de Austria, Andrade, San Antonio María Claret, Lope de Vega, Espronceda, Mistral, Wellington, Cristóbal de Moura and Buenaventura Muñoz; cities and provinces of Spain, such as Álava, Ávila, Badajoz, Bilbao, Cantabria, Cartagena, Castilla, Ciudad de Granada, Guipúzcoa, La Coruña, Murcia, Palencia, Pamplona, Vizcaya and Zamora; international cities, such as Paris, London, Rome and Buenos Aires; and countries such as Morocco, Bolivia, Paraguay, Peru and Venezuela.

A particular case is that of Plaça de Catalunya, which has emerged in recent years as the first space located behind the city walls, just where Passeig de Gràcia begins. The Cerdà Plan did not include this square, which was intended to be a block of buildings (no. 39). However, it soon became a central place with a large influx of people, which attracted commercial and recreational activity, so that various entertainment and catering establishments were installed in the place. Over time, people began to call it by its current name, a spontaneous nomination of vague origin that came to be imposed in such a way that the city council had no choice but to make it official. Thus, when in 1860 Queen Isabel II inaugurated the works of the Eixample, the square had already received this popular name, which was collected in 1865 by Victor Balaguer in his compendium of Las calles de Barcelona.

==== Sexenio Democrático ====
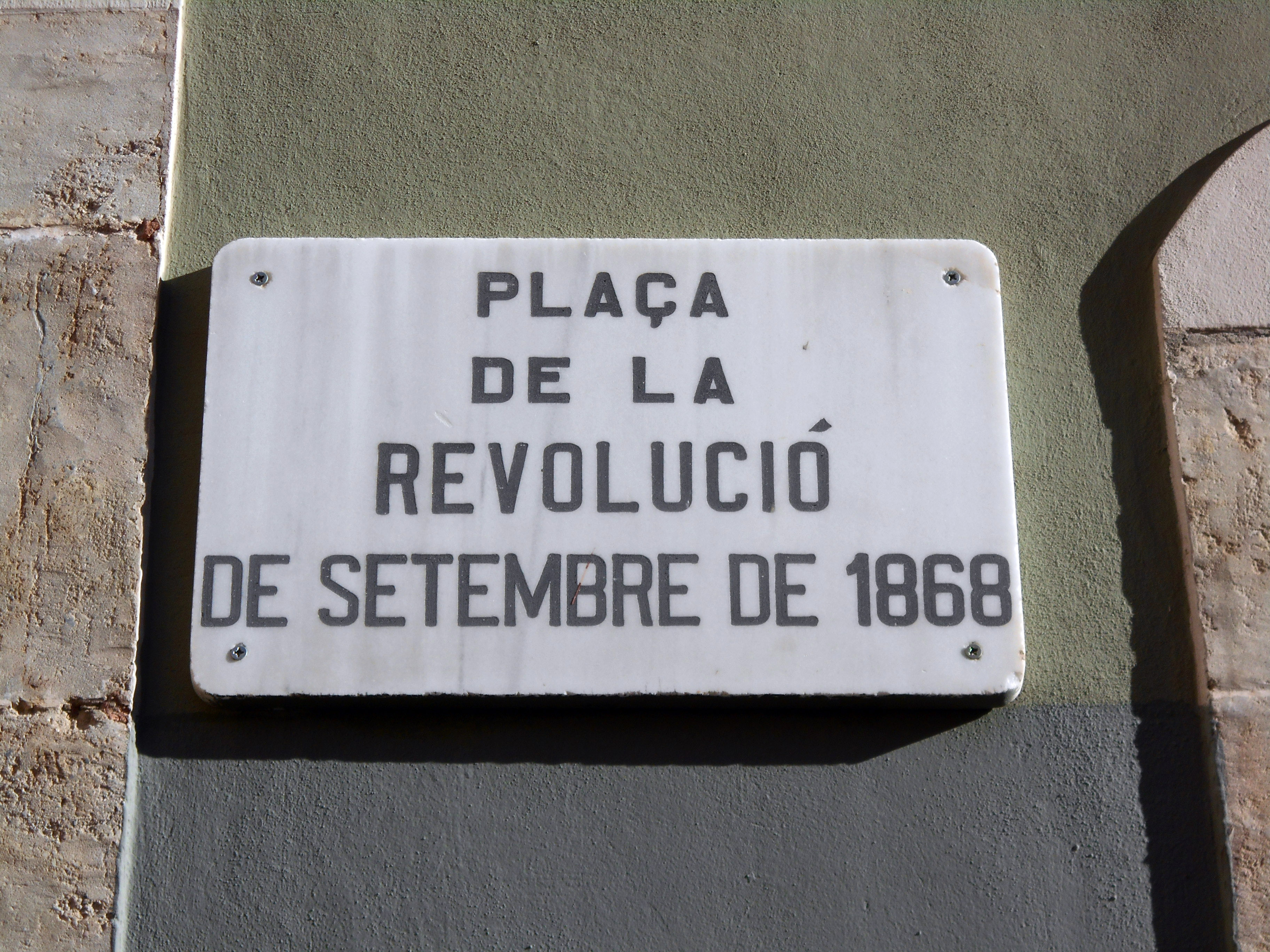
Plaça de la Revolució de Setembre de 1868 ("Revolution of September of 1868 square").

The Glorious Revolution of 1868 again brought about numerous changes in the gazetteer. In a session held on January 26, 1869, the city council decided to change the following streets: Cristina for República, Fernando VII for Libertad, Isabel II for Alcolea, Isabel II (Hostafrancs) for Béjar, Princesa for Cádiz, Princesa (Hostafrancs) for Mas y Ventura — two lieutenants who staged a progressive revolt and were shot in 1866–, Rambla de Isabel II for Rambla de Cataluña, Pla de Palau for Plaza del Comercio, Plaza Real for Plaza Nacional and Plaza del Rey for Plaza del Pueblo. These changes became effective all except Cristina Street, which was finally called Prim and not Republic, and lasted during the First Republic (1873–1874), with the only addition in 1873 of changing the Portal de la Paz to Portal de la Junta Revolucionaria.

The Sexenio Democrático (English: The six democratic or revolutionary years) was also reflected in the towns of the plain of Barcelona:

- Gràcia: Isabel II street was divided in two, Luna and Mariana Pineda streets; Isabel II square became Revolution square; and Príncipe, Princesa, Virrey, Virreina and Caballeros streets became Escuder, Argüelles, Maldonado, Torrijos and Zurbano, respectively.
- Sants: Isabel II became Riego, Plaza de la Iglesia became Plaza de la Federación — for the Spanish Regional Federation of the International Workers Association — and a stretch of the Bordeta road was called Calle de la Constitución.
- Sant Martí de Provençals: Isabel II square was renamed Prim square, and Princesa street was Topete street.
- Sarrià: Isabel II became Libertad, Príncipe was Serrano, and Cristina changed to Prim.
- Les Corts: Plaza de la Iglesia was changed to Plaza de la Constitución.
- Sant Andreu de Palomar: Isabel II became Don Juan Prim.

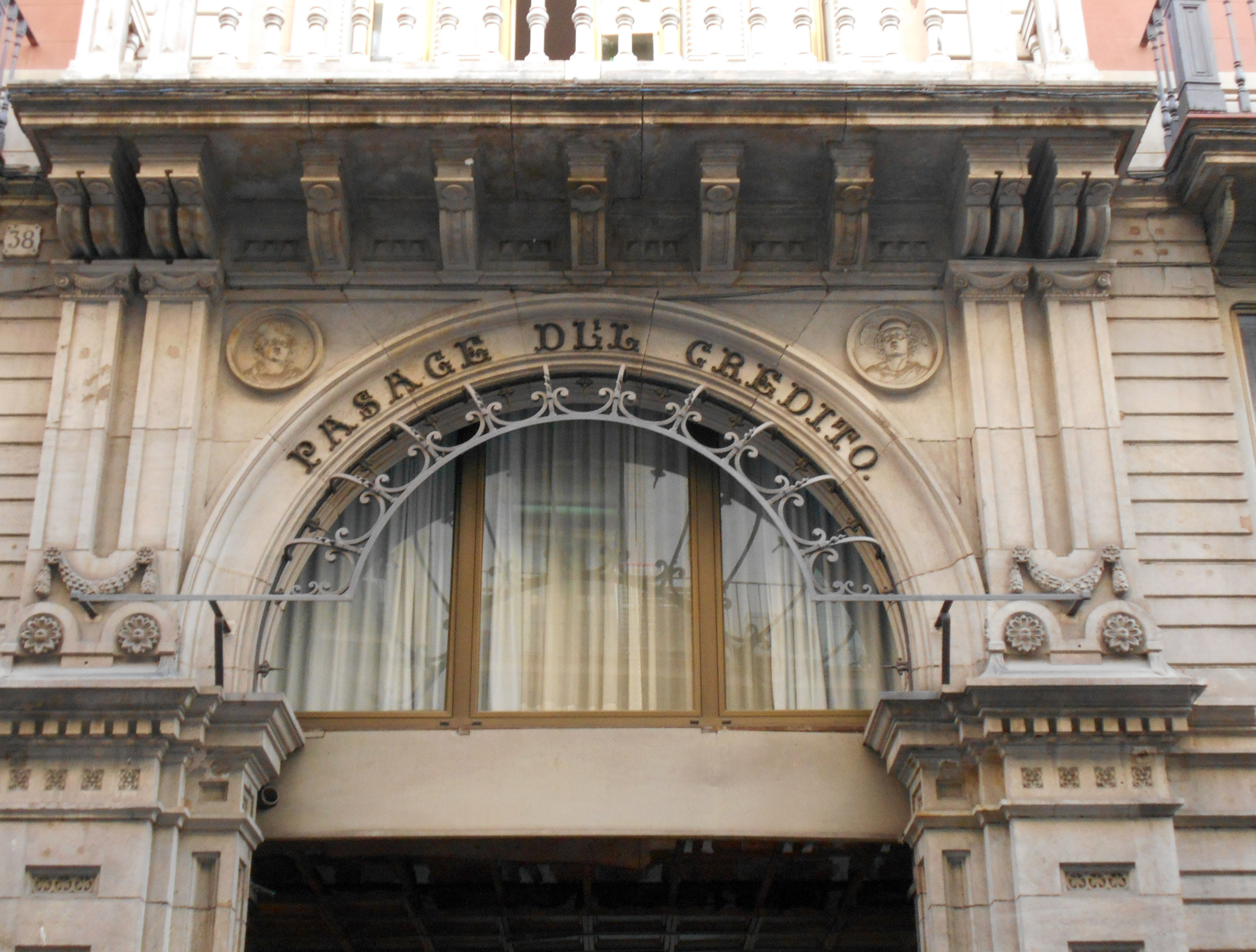
In the 19th century several gallery-passages were opened, such as the Pasaje del Crédito (1875).

During the eleven months that the First Republic lasted there were hardly any changes because the period was so short, although there was an express will to make them, as can be seen in the promulgation of the following ordinance:

Since the streets are not properly labeled and in order that their names do not have the religious tone that they have today, street names of saints should be changed to others that are more appropriate and symbolize the present time.

With the Bourbon restoration all these changes were reversed, with a few exceptions, such as Rambla de Cataluña, which continued to be called that way, or Béjar street in Hostafrancs, which although it temporarily became Isabel II, in 1879 returned to Béjar. On the other hand, in the neighboring towns most of the changes were not reversed, and many remained until the arrival of Franco's dictatorship; some have even remained unchanged to the present day, such as Constitution Street. There were also some occasional changes, such as Avenida Marqués del Duero for Avenida del Paralelo, in 1874.

There were few other changes until the end of the century. In 1883 the cemetery of Montjuïc was inaugurated, which due to its extension was divided into streets that received names of religious sign. At the end of the century an event was held that had a great economic, social, urban, artistic and cultural impact on the city: the 1888 Barcelona Universal Exposition. It was held in the park of the Citadel, a land formerly belonging to the army that housed the fortress of the Citadel — hence the name given to the park — won for the city in 1868. In addition to the Citadel, the Salón de San Juan (now Passeig de Lluís Companys), a long 50-meter wide avenue that served as the entrance to the Exposition, at the beginning of which was placed the Arc de Triomf, designed by José Vilaseca, was remodeled. The Paseo de Circunvalación, which surrounds the park on the south side, was also opened.

=== 20th century ===
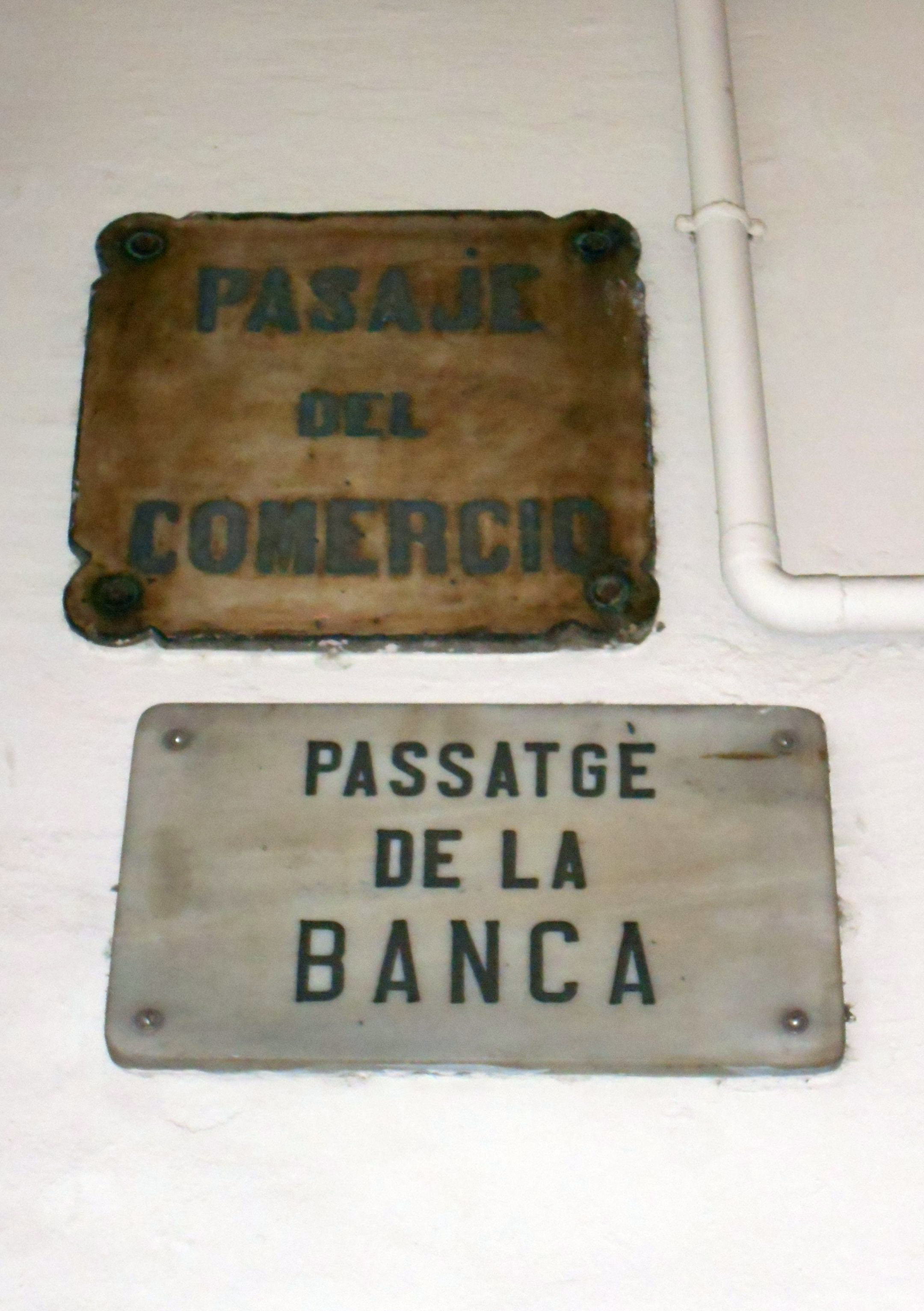
The 20th century has seen numerous changes in labeling regulations, with alternation between Spanish and Catalan, as well as the change of names for political reasons.

The 20th century was conditioned by the convulsive political situation, namely the General Primo de Rivera dictatorship (1923–1931), the end of the monarchy in 1931 and the proclamation of the Second Republic, which ended with the Civil War and was replaced by Franco's dictatorship, until the reestablishment of the monarchy and the arrival of democracy. Socially, this century saw the massive arrival of immigration, mainly from the south of Spain, to the city, with the consequent increase in population: if in 1900 there were 530,000 inhabitants, by 1930 they had almost doubled (1,009,000 inhabitants), reaching a peak between 1970 and 1980 (1,754,900) and by the end of the century 1,500,000 inhabitants.

==== Municipal aggregations ====
The beginning of the century was marked by the geographical expansion of the city: in 1897 Barcelona annexed six bordering towns that had been independent until then: Sants, Les Corts, Sant Gervasi de Cassoles, Gràcia, Sant Andreu de Palomar and Sant Martí de Provençals. Horta was also annexed in 1904; in 1921, Sarrià and Santa Creu d'Olorda (a small piece of land in the Collserola Hills detached from Molins de Rei); in 1924, Collblanc and the Marina de l'Hospitalet, where the Zona Franca was created; and, in 1943, El Bon Pastor and Baró de Viver, scinded from Santa Coloma de Gramenet. The city grew from 15.5 km^{2} to 77.8 km^{2}, and from a population of 383,908 to 559,589.

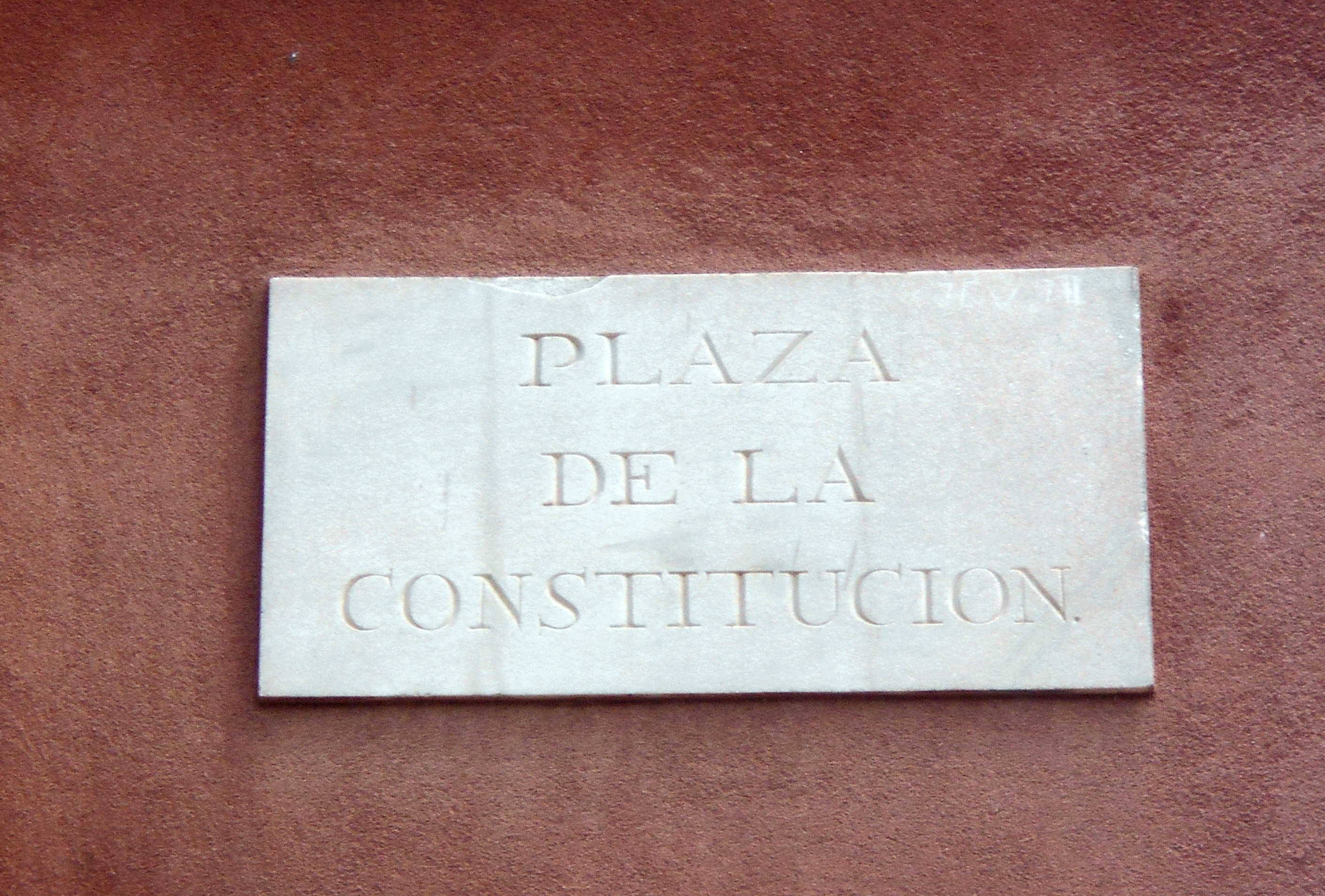
Old plaque in the Plaza de la Constitución in Horta, currently Plaça de Santes Creus.

With the aggregation of the neighboring municipalities and the new incorporation of a large number of public roads, it was found that there were numerous duplicities, since several municipalities — and also neighborhoods on the outskirts of Barcelona, such as Hostafrancs, La Barceloneta and Poble Sec — had streets with the same names, especially in terms of streets named after saints. For example, there were nine streets named after St. Joseph, and eight named after St. John. While this situation was being regularized, it was necessary to clarify the former locality of each street in the correspondence, so that it would reach its correct destination. In 1907, a report was created in charge of the nomenclature of the streets, thanks to whose work 361 streets were renamed to avoid these duplicities. The new names incorporated a new ordinance drafted in 1905 that established the dedication of personalities only ten years after their death.

Different criteria were used to name the new streets: towns in Catalonia (Agramunt, Arbós, Calaf, Cambrils, Escornalbou); counties in Catalonia (Panadés, Priorat, La Selva); Spanish regions (Asturias, Extremadura, Castile, Canary Islands); illustrious personalities of the towns added (Agustí Milà, Pons i Gallarza, Guillem Tell); personalities of the cultural world (Bretón de los Herreros, Marian Aguiló, Ramón y Cajal, Jules Verne, Voltaire, Zola, Frederic Soler, Frederic Mistral); republican or liberal figures (Doctor Rizal, Estanislao Figueras, Víctor Balaguer, Ríos Rosas, Rossend Arús, Sunyer i Capdevila, Vidal y Valenciano); names from the workers' movement (La Internacional, Élisée Reclus, Emancipación); and figures from the past (Socrates, Pythagoras, Rubens, Titian, Pasteur).

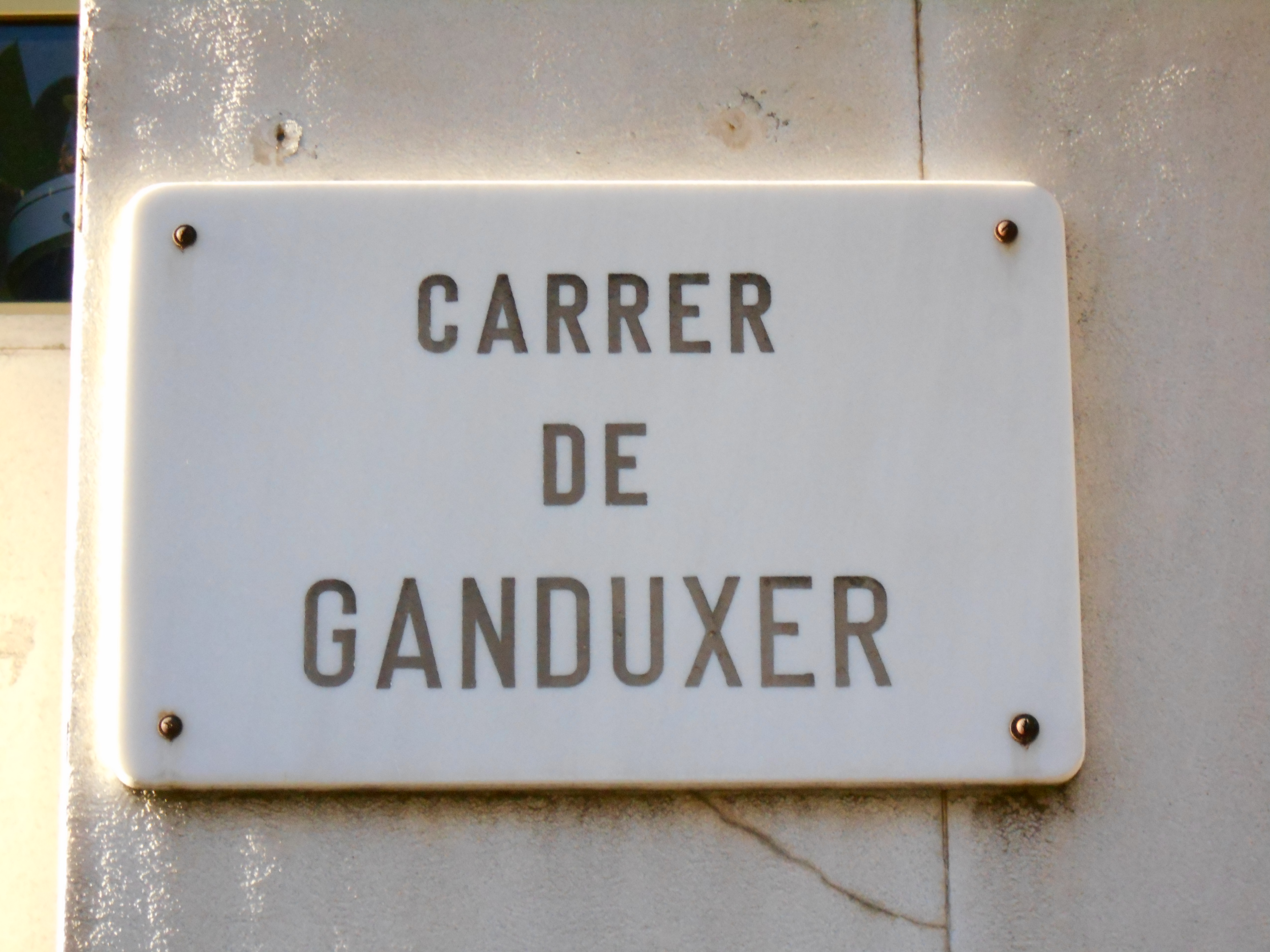
Ganduxer Street, by the owner of the land, Pau Ganduxer i Aymerich

The aggregation also revealed a phenomenon that occurred frequently between the 19th and early 20th centuries: many plots of land previously used for agriculture were developed by their owners, who often gave their own name or that of their relatives to the newly created roads. There is for example the case of Pau Ganduxer i Aymerich, from whom Ganduxer street comes from, while he named Ganduxer square (nowadays Ferran Casablancas square) in honor of his father, Francesc Ganduxer i Garriga; Aymerich street (now Cerignola street) after his mother, Rita Aymerich; Carrencà street after his wife, Josepa Carrencà; and Torras i Pujalt street after his son-in-law, Joaquim Torras i Pujalt.

Another paradigmatic case is that of the urbanization of the Torre del Simó estate, in Gràcia, which led to the street of Santa Ágata for the owner, Àgata Badia i Puigrodon; the street of Santa Rosa for her mother, Rosa Puigrodon i Pla; Santa Magdalena Street by her mother-in-law, Magdalena Escarabatxeras i Blanch; San Antonio Square by her husband, Antoni Trilla (now Trilla Square); and, in addition, Badia Street, by her father, Joan Badia, and Trilla Street, by her father-in-law, Antoni Trilla.

As a general rule, and somewhat inexplicably, most of the town councils of the towns of the plain used to approve these dispositions dictated by the landowners. For example, this petition by Miquela de Paguera in 1847 to the town council of San Martín de Provensals for a piece of land located in Camp de l'Arpa:

She will open four spacious streets, which she wishes to name: 1st, of Joan de Peguera; 2nd, of Blessed Miguel; 3rd, of the Virgin of Carmen; 4th, of the Eternal Memory, to pay in this way a just tribute to that of her late husband, who made her happiness.

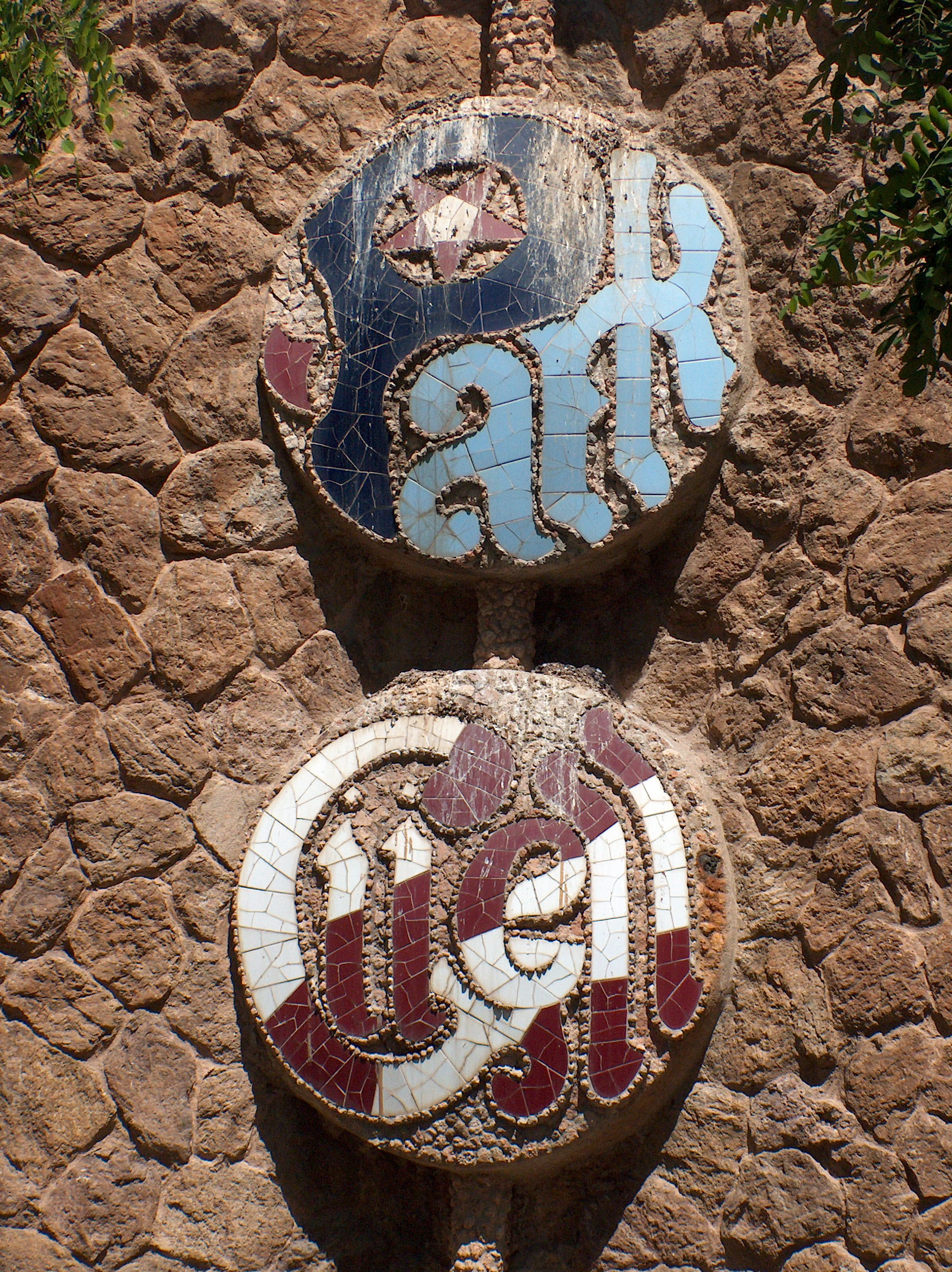
Park Güell.

It should also be noted that with the aggregation, some of the roads linking the old towns were renamed. Thus, the road from Sant Andreu to Collblanc was divided into three: Solar, Travessera del Carril and Travessera — the three now form the Travessera de Gràcia; and the road from Cornellà to Fogars de Tordera was also divided into sections: avinguda d'Esplugues, Bisbe Català, passeig de la Reina Elisenda de Montcada, passeig de la Bonanova, passeig de Sant Gervasi, passeig de la Vall d'Hebron and passeig de Valldaura.

Also in the early years of the century, the slopes of Tibidabo were urbanized and occupied by single-family houses in the style of English garden cities. Its main artery is Tibidabo Avenue, a name that refers to the mountain and comes from a biblical quote: haec omnia tibi dabo si cadens adoraveris me, "all this I will give you if you prostrate yourself before me to worship me" (Matthew 4:9). A square is also dedicated to Doctor Andreu, promoter of the urbanization.

Another urbanization of this period was the Can Muntaner estate (1900–1914), at the foot of Mount Carmel, in the neighborhood of La Salut, also designed as a garden city of single-family houses. The promoter was the industrialist Eusebi Güell, and the architect Antoni Gaudí was in charge of the layout. The project was unsuccessful, as only two plots were sold, and in 1926 the land was ceded to the city council and converted into a park, known today as Park Güell.

In 1905 Josepets square was renamed after Lesseps, the builder of the Suez Canal, who had been the French consul in Barcelona. In 1907 the Plaça d'Eivissa was created in Horta, dedicated to the Balearic island; the same year and in the same neighborhood, the Rambla de Cortada was changed to Calle de Campoamor, after the Asturian poet. Also in 1907, Ancha Street in the district of Gracia was changed to Verdi, in honor of the Italian composer Giuseppe Verdi. On the other hand, in 1908, the so-called Dalt road, in Sagrera, was changed to Concepción Arenal street. In 1909, the road of the Waters was opened in Tibidabo, so called because it was built by the Sociedad General de Aguas de Barcelona.

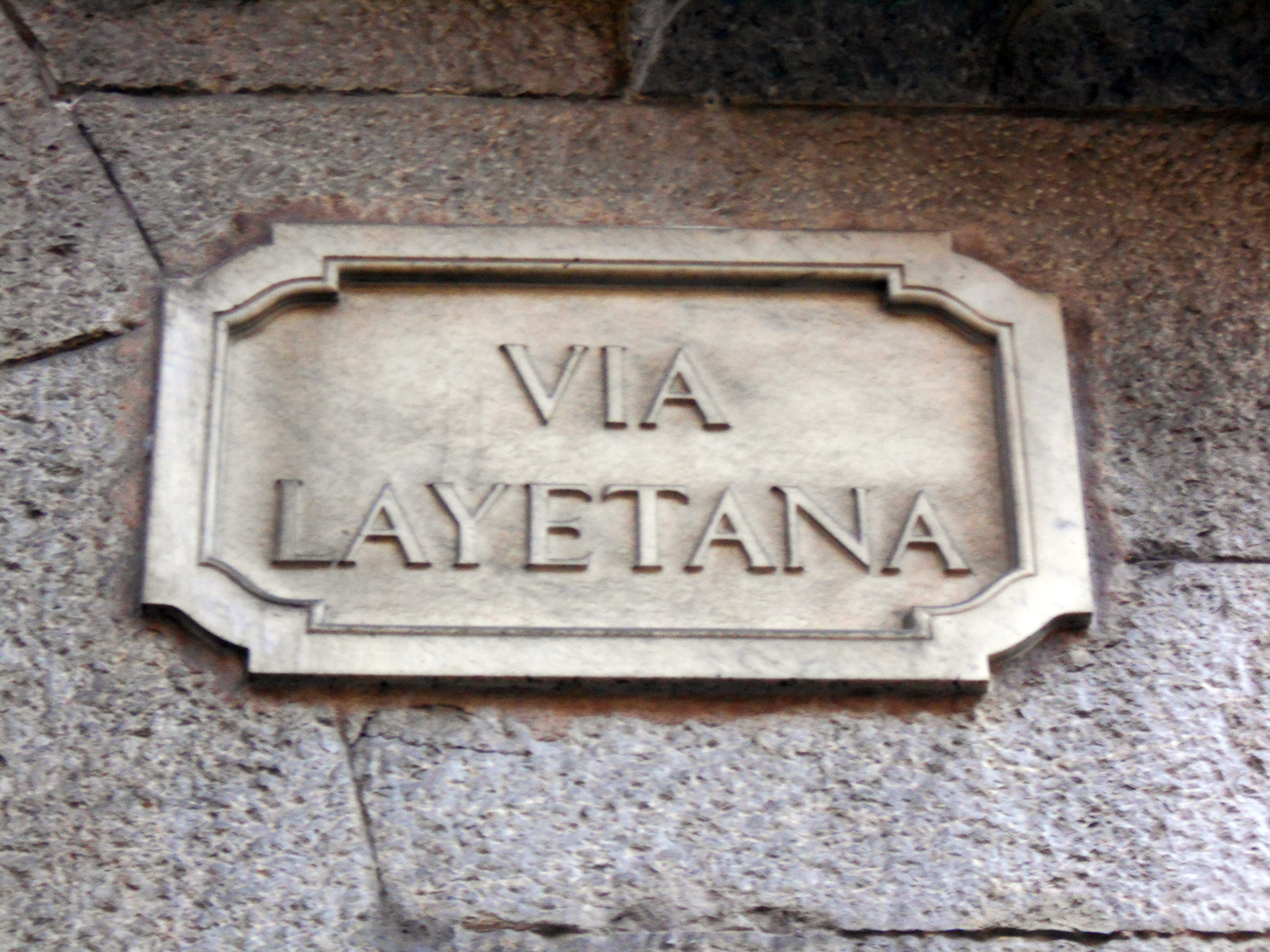
Via Layetana.

During the first years of the century, the Port of Barcelona was enlarged (1905–1912), with a project that extended the eastern dock and built a counter dock and the inner docks. These works gave the port practically its current appearance, except for the construction of the south dock and the inner dock in 1965. Along its extension, it has the following piers: Adosado, Álvarez de la Campa, Atarazanas, Baleares, Barcelona, Barceloneta, Bosch i Alsina, Cataluña, Contradique, Costa, Dársena interior, Dársena sur, Depósito, España, Evaristo Fernández, Inflammables, Lepanto, Levante, Madera, Marina'92, Nuevo, Nuevo Contradique, Occidental, Oeste, Oriental, Pescadores, Petroleros, Poniente, Príncipe de España, Reloj, San Beltrán, Sur and Varadero.

The most important urban development action during these years was the opening of the Via Layetana, which connected the Eixample with the sea, projected with the letter A in the Baixeras Plan of 1878. The works were finally carried out between 1908 and 1913, with joint financing between the City Council and the Banco Hispano Colonial. Initially it was planned to be called Bilbao, but it was finally named Via Layetana, in honor of the Iberian people of the Layetanos, the first known inhabitants of the Barcelona plain. The layout of the new road entailed the disappearance of 85 streets of medieval origin, as well as the appearance of new roads in the areas surrounding the road: some of them were named after heroes of the War of Independence, such as Ramon Mas, Doctor Joaquim Pou and Julià Portet; a street was dedicated to Àngel Baixeras, author of the urban planning project; and the square of Ramon Berenguer the Great, Count of Barcelona, was opened.

==== Catalan nationalist period ====
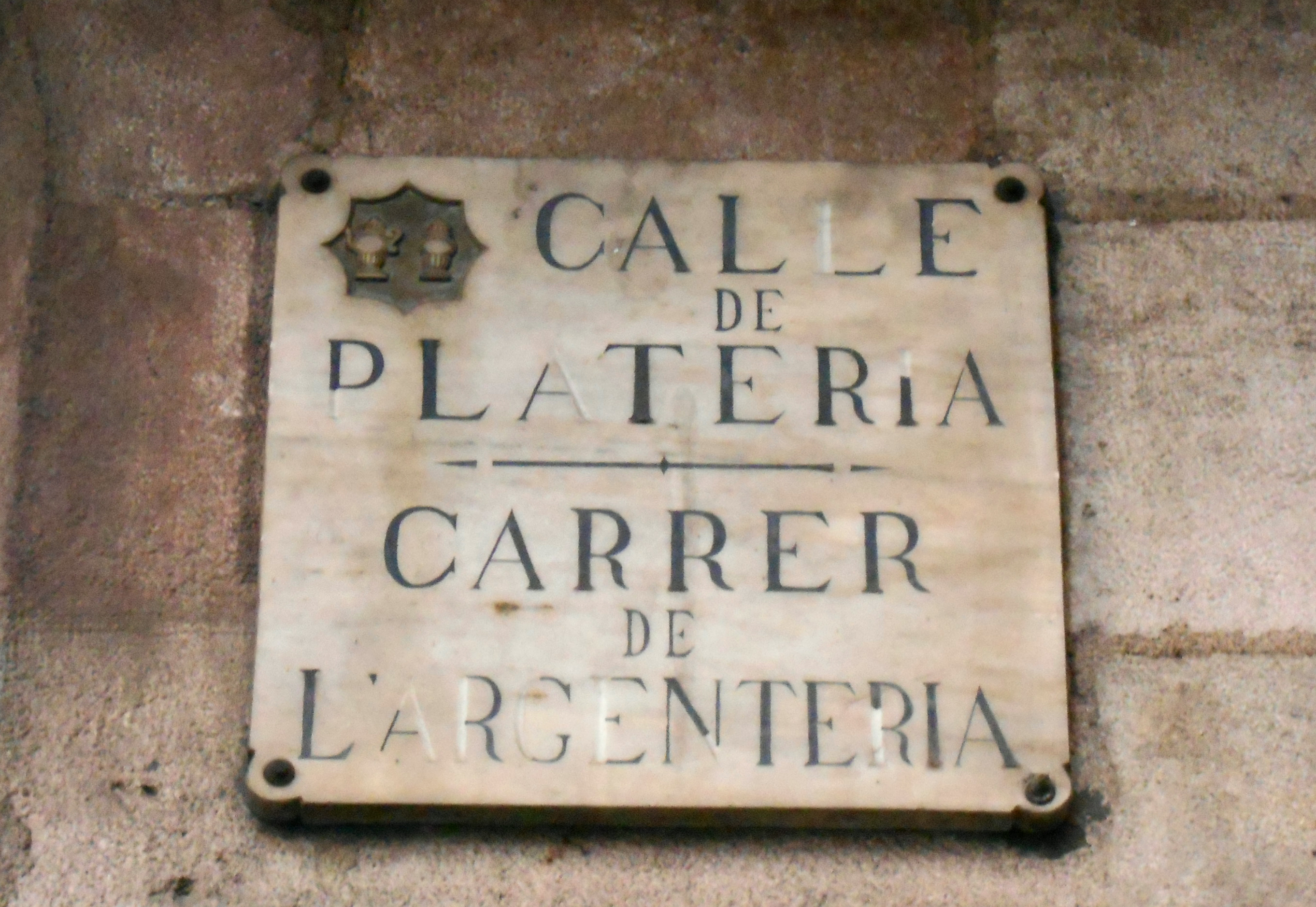
Calle de la Platería / Carrer de l'Argenteria, bilingual plaque used by the Commonwealth of Catalonia.

In 1914, when the Commonwealth of Catalonia was created, the streets began to be labeled in the Catalan language. However, this only applied to the new streets, while the old plaques were not replaced. For a time, even bilingual plates were placed, made of enameled iron and in a larger size.

The Catalan nationalist trend of City Hall, dominated by the Lliga Regionalista between 1915 and 1923, led to some changes in this direction: so, avenida Diagonal was renamed Catalan Nationality; Montjuïc de San Pedro Street became Verdaguer Callís; and Antonio Maura Square was renamed Fivaller. On the other hand, the conservative ideology of the Lliga was reflected in the dedication of some streets to businessmen and characters of the bourgeoisie, such as the Rambla de Santa Eulàlia, which became Passeig de Fabra i Puig, for the businessmen Fabra i Puig brothers; on the other hand, the proposal to dedicate the Rambla de Catalunya to Eusebi Güell did not prosper.

In 1914 Manicomi road was renamed Doctor Pi i Molist street, after the doctor and writer Emili Pi i Molist. The following year Avinguda de Pearson was created, dedicated to Frederick Stark Pearson, founder of the Barcelona Traction electric company. In 1916 Prat Street was changed to Rambla del Carmel, the main street of the neighborhood of the same name. On the other hand, in 1917 the old Sant Cugat road, called Passeig de la Diputació since 1879, was renamed Avinguda de la República Argentina.

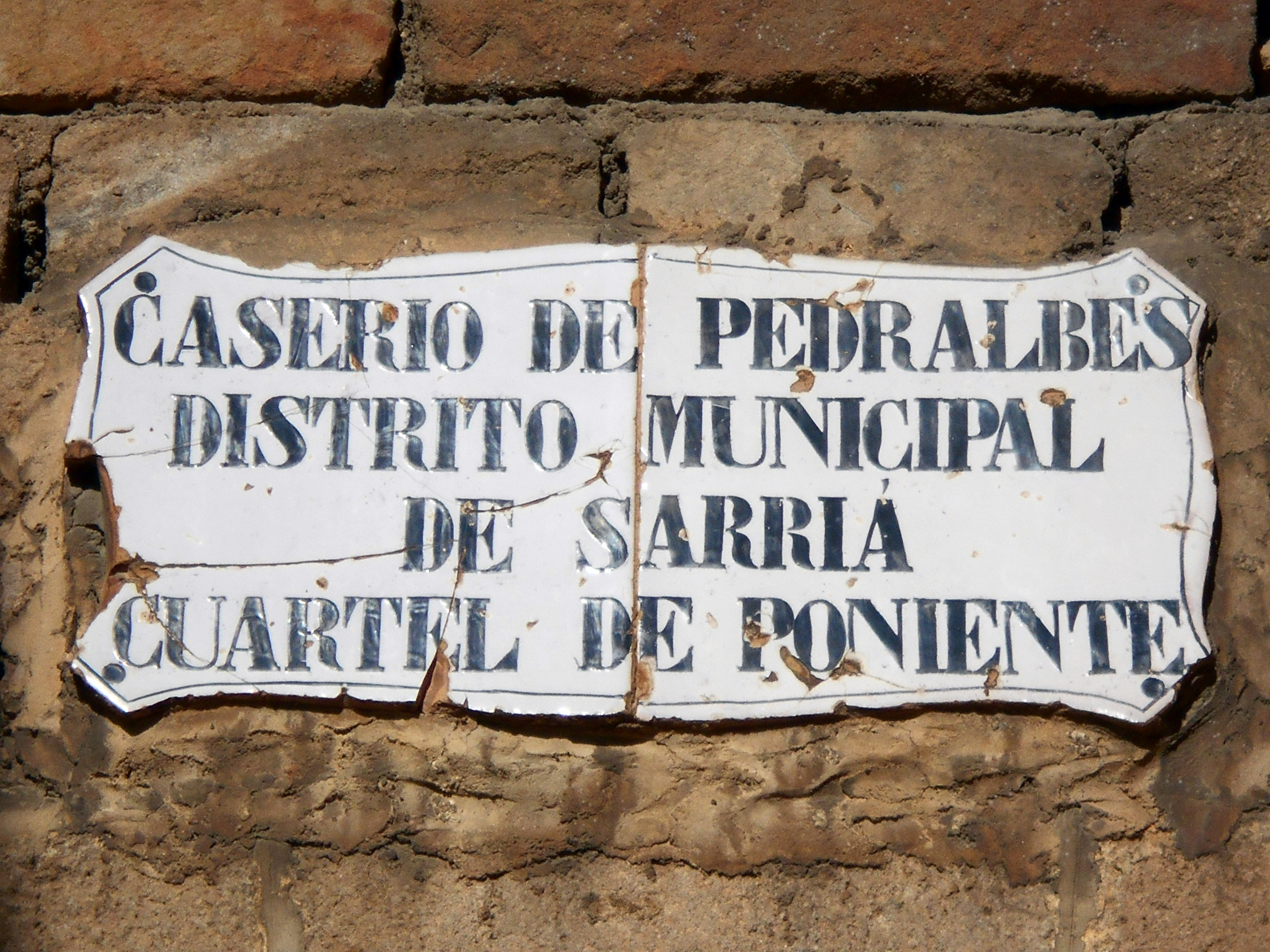
Pedralbes farmhouse, plate of the old town hall of Sarrià, municipality added in 1921.

At the end of World War I, in 1918, and due to the Francophile tendency of the consistory, several streets were named with names related to the war: the newly created Plaça de Ramon Berenguer el Gran was called Plaça de l'11 de Novembre de 1918, date of the end of the war, although in 1922 it returned to its previous name; the Plaça d'Estanislau Figueras was dedicated to Marshal Joffre (currently Plaça de Vázquez de Mella); and the Passeig de Verdun was created, named after a battle of the Great War.

In 1920 the name of the Passeig del Cementiri was changed at the request of the merchants of the area, for whom it was not a very flattering name. It was renamed Icària Avenue, in memory of an Icarian community established in the area in the mid-nineteenth century. During the Civil War it was called Avenue of the Social Revolution, and during Franco's regime, Captain López Varela, to recover the name of Icària in 1978.

The last municipal aggregation, that of Sarrià, in 1921, again entailed the change of several streets due to duplicities and other factors. On this occasion, in view of the antecedents, the last session of the Sarrià town council proposed the new names, anticipating the Barcelona consistory. They had to change 70 streets, although of those proposed by Sarrià only 14 were finally approved, since the effective change coincided with the beginning of the dictatorship of Primo de Rivera, who disallowed diverse names of Catalanist sign.

In 1921 the Sanllehí square was also created, on the border between Gràcia and Horta-Guinardó, dedicated to Domènec Sanllehí, who was mayor of Barcelona in 1906.

==== Dictatorship of Primo de Rivera ====
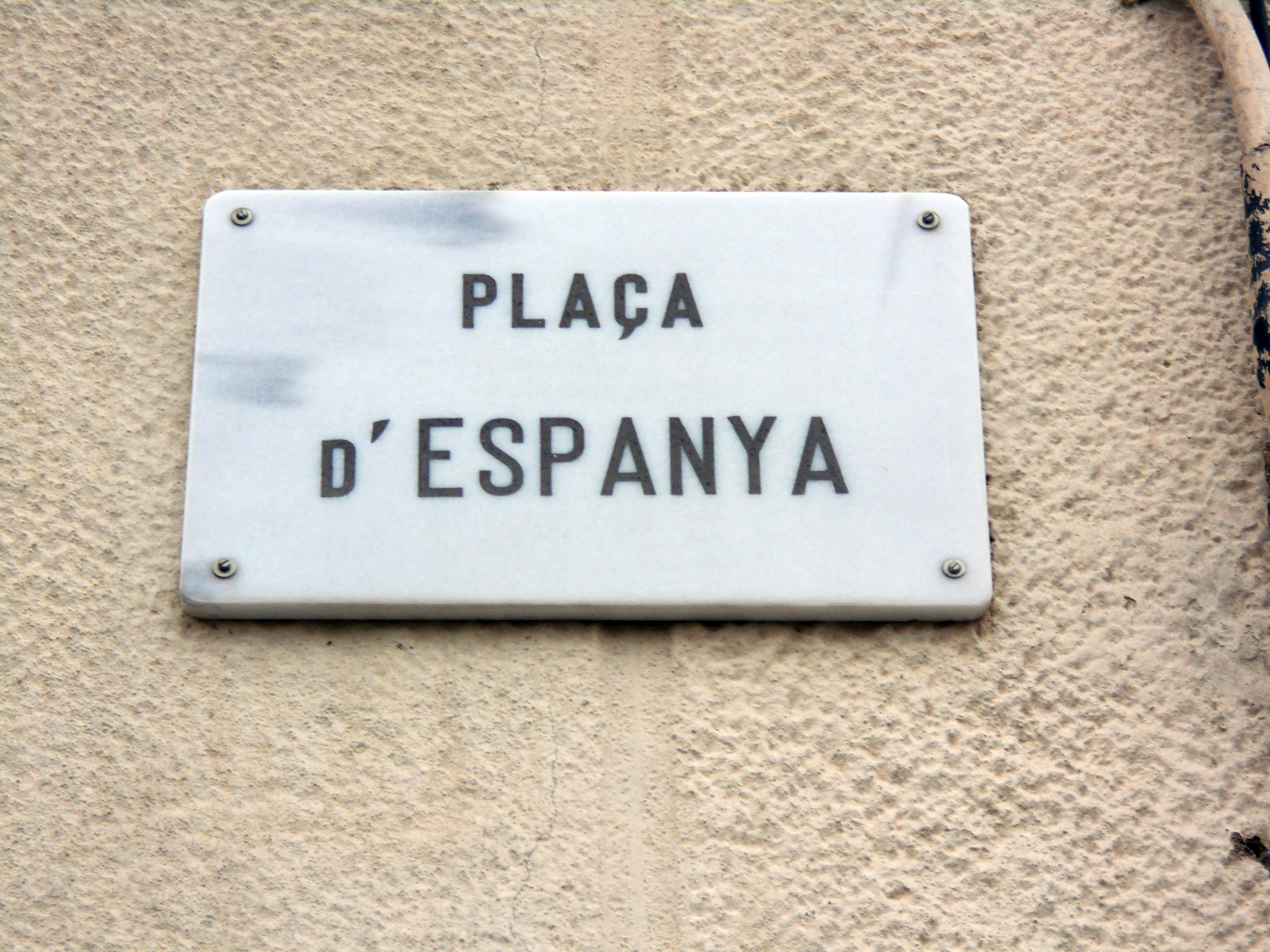
Plaça d'Espanya.

With the arrival of the dictatorship of Primo de Rivera in 1923, the signage returned to Spanish. Councilman Ignasi de Ros proposed the partition of the bilingual plaques so that only the Spanish version would remain, but as it was very costly, they were all finally replaced.

The new regime also made considerable changes in the nomenclature, although it took some time: in 1923 only Maryland Street was changed to Marqués de Foronda; finally, in 1927 a Ponencia de Cambios de Nombres de Calles ("Street Renaming Presentation") was instituted, followed by another in 1929. The new names chosen were generally names of the royal family, military, and episodes of Spanish history.

Thus, several streets were dedicated to the Spanish royal family: Avinguda de la Nacionalitat Catalana (former Diagonal) became Argüelles, but soon after was renamed Alfonso XIII; Riera de Cassoles became Avinguda del Príncep d'Astúries; Avinguda d'Amèrica was renamed Reina María Cristina, to whom a square was also dedicated on the Diagonal; Gran Vía P — the provisional name of a new road in Les Corts — was transformed into Infanta Carlota Joaquina street (nowadays Josep Tarradellas avenue); and the old Sant Iscle road was reconverted into Borbón avenue.

Another good number of streets were dedicated to military men: Carrer de la Concòrdia was changed to Calle del Almirante Aixada; Carrer Número 2 de l'Eixample de Sant Andreu became Almirante Próxida; Diagonal de Sant Pau was dedicated to the dictator, General Primo de Rivera (current Avinguda de Gaudí); Carrer Lletra X to General Magaz (current Plaça de Maragall); the current Plaça de la Sagrada Família — then recently opened and without a name — to General Barrera; the Nova d'Horta road to General Martínez Anido (now Passeig de Maragall); a street was also dedicated to the dictator's brother, Fernando Primo de Rivera (now Pere Duran Farell); the 17th street of the Les Corts urban plan to Captain Arenas; and Ebre street to Coronel Sanfeliu.

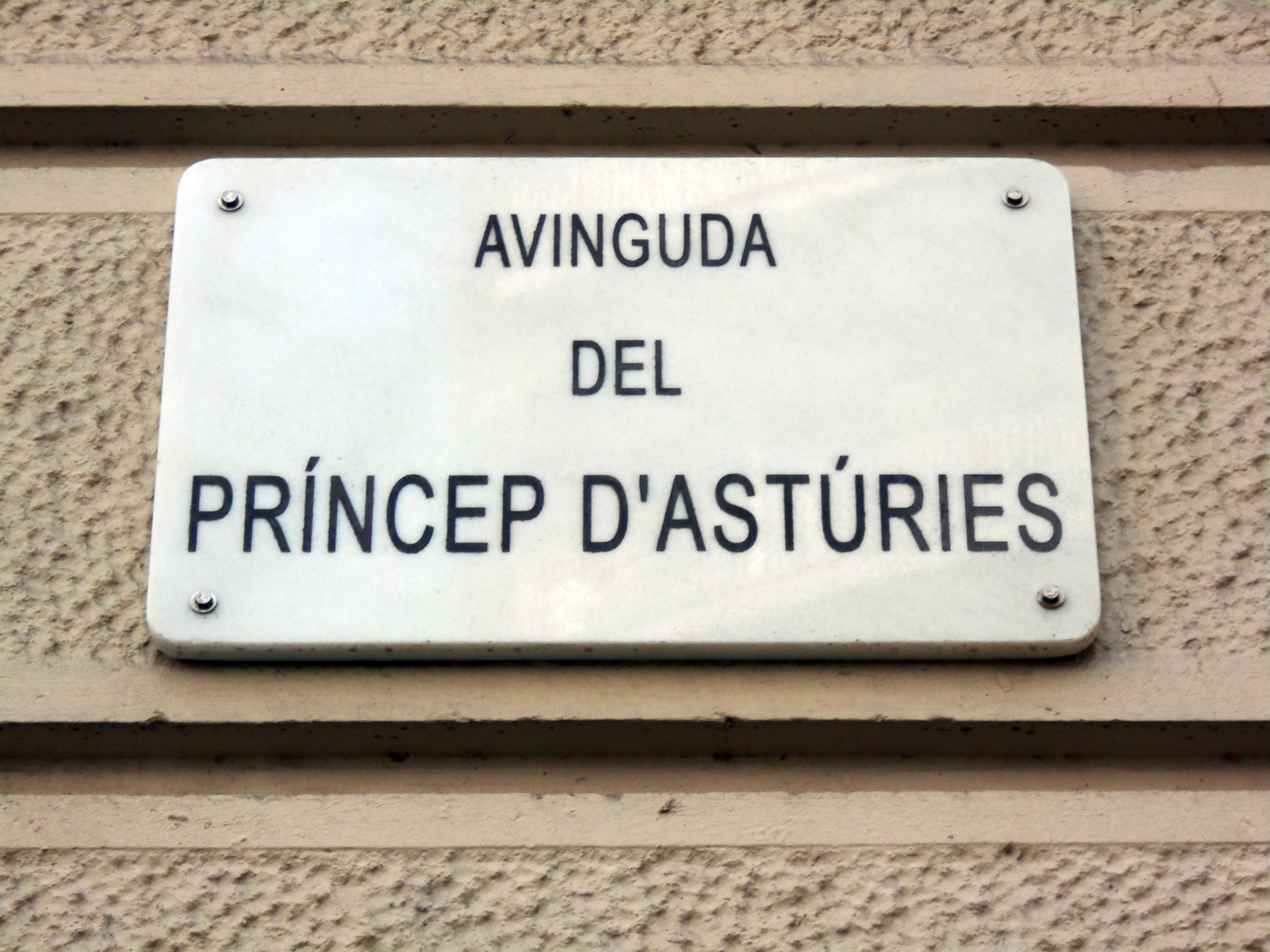
Príncep d'Astúries avenue (currently Avinguda de la Riera de Cassoles).

In the district of Sant Martí, several streets were changed to events and characters linked to the Habsburg dynasty: Bac de Roda street to Felipe II; Fluvià to Juan de Austria; Catalunya street to Sant Quintí; Vilanova to Cristóbal de Moura; and Lluís Pellicer to Padilla.

There were also numerous changes in Sarrià, reversing the last decision of the Sarrià consistory before its aggregation: Prat de la Riba square to Duque de Gandía (current Sarrià square); Mare de Déu de Núria street to Virgen de Covadonga; Doctor Robert street to Passeig de la Bonanova; Abadessa Çaportella to Reyes Católicos; Pare Miquel de Sarrià to Beato Diego de Cádiz; Nicolàs Travé to Avión Plus Ultra; Sant Vicenç de Sarrià square to San Vicente Español; and Consell de la Vila square to Poeta Zorrilla.

Other changes were: Víctor Hugo to Paseo de San Gervasio, Voltaire to Siracusa, Mariscal Joffre to Vázquez de Mella, Fivaller to Antonio Maura, Regionalisme to Canónigo Pibernat, Solidaritat to Orden and the Plaça de las Glòries Catalanes to Glorias.

In 1929 the International Exhibition was held in Montjuïc. For this event the whole area of the Plaça d'Espanya, the Plaça de l'Univers and the Avinguda de la Reina Maria Cristina was urbanized, ending in a series of squares that ascended towards the National Palace: Plaça de la Font Màgica (currently de Carles Buïgas), Plaça del Marquès de Foronda (currently de Josep Puig i Cadafalch) and Plaça de les Cascades, as well as the Passeig de les Cascades (currently de Jean C. N. Forestier). The avenues of Rius i Taulet and Marqués de Comillas (now de Francesc Ferrer i Guàrdia) were also opened, as well as the Laribal and Miramar gardens, designed by Forestier. In 1942 the Paseo de la Exposicion was created in memory of the event.

For the Exposition, the Poble Espanyol (Spanish Village) was also created, an enclosure that houses reproductions of different urban and architectural environments from all over the national territory, designed by architects Ramon Reventós and Francesc Folguera. It is structured like a village, with a main square and several streets: Príncipe de Viana street, Caballeros street, Castellana square, Conquest street, Tercio street, Candil street, Alcalde de Móstoles street, Alcalde de Zalamea street, Cervantes descent, Maestrazgo street, Rius i Taulet street, Triste corner, Santiago steps, Church square, Aragonesa square, Carmen square, Bulas street, Cuna street, Davallada street, Peñaflor square, Mercaderes street, Hermandad square, Levante street, and Fuente square.

Also in 1929 the Jardinets de Gràcia ("little gardens") were created by Nicolau Maria Rubió y Tudurí. In 1991 they were dedicated to Salvador Espriu, who lived in the area.

==== Second Republic ====
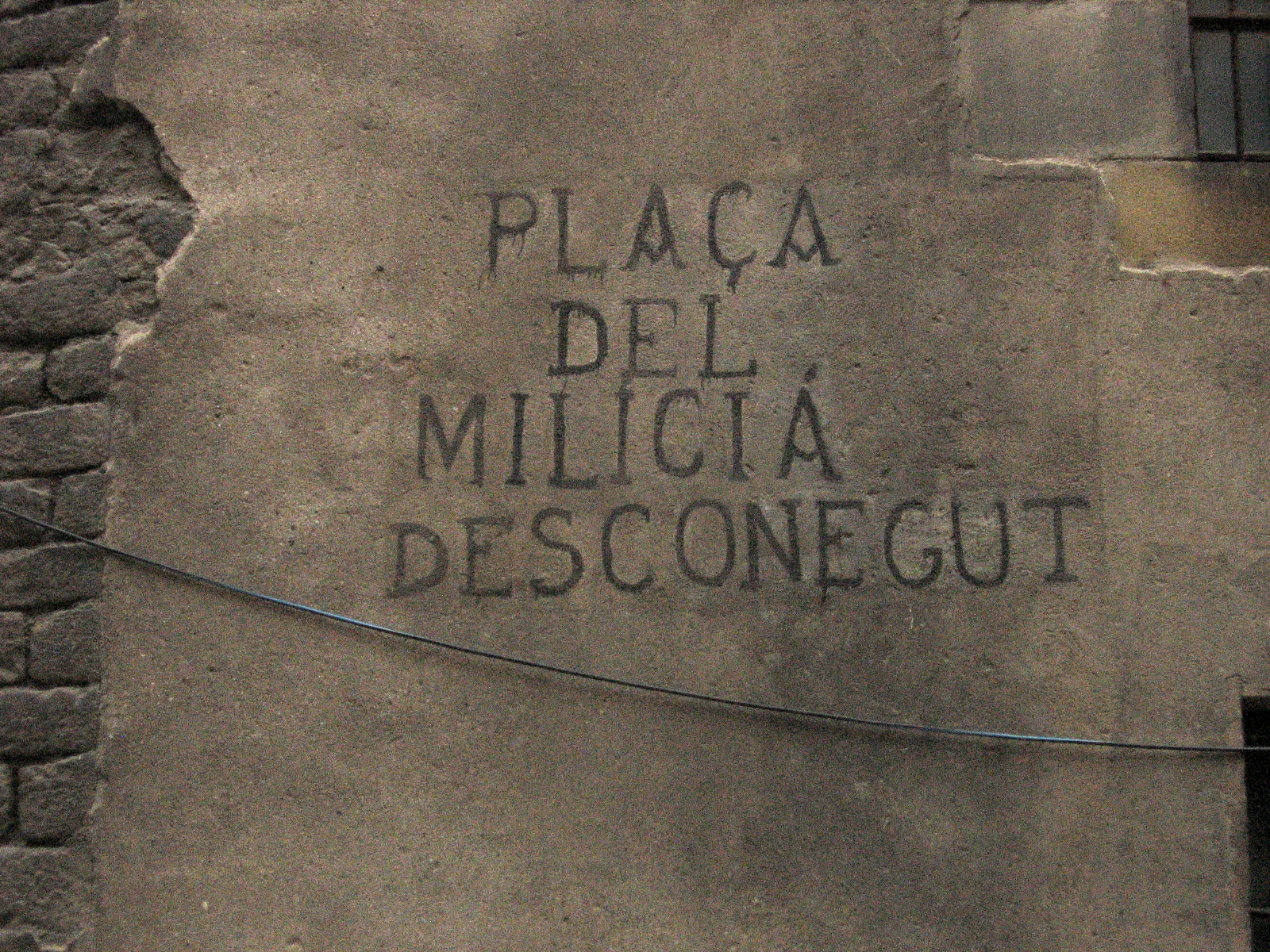
Plaça del Milicià desconegut (1938), now Plaça de Sant Josep Oriol.

The fall of the dictatorship of Primo de Rivera led to several changes even before the arrival of the Republic: on February 4, 1931, during the so-called Dictablanda ("soft dictatorship") of General Dámaso Berenguer, Councilman Martí Esteve proposed a series of initiatives to modify streets of the dictatorship: disappearance of military names, return to the previous name of several streets, recovery of the name proposed by Sarrià to several streets and changed by the dictatorship, and return to the Catalan version of several badly Castilianized streets. Two squares and an avenue that still had no name were also baptized: the one located in front of El Molino, called Blasco Ibáñez; the one popularly known as Cinc d'Oros, dedicated to Pi i Margall (currently Plaça del Cinc d'Oros); and the avenue also popularly called Diagonal del Ferrocarril, which became the Generalitat's avenue (currently Avinguda de Roma).

With the advent of the Second Spanish Republic on April 14, 1931, the streets were once again changed from Castilian to Catalan — which was not fully reflected on the plaques, as it was a slow and costly process — and numerous street names were changed. The new consistory, presided over by Jaume Aiguader, took up the proposals made months earlier by Esteve, to which it added a hundred more changes, which it approved on August 26, 1931. Most of the changes of the dictatorship were reversed, especially those of the military and royalty and nobility, although those that were acceptable to the new regime were respected.

Some of the most significant changes were: Avenida de Alfonso XIII (Diagonal) to Avinguda del Catorze d'Abril, Plaça de Sant Jaume to Plaça de la República, Plaça Reial to Plaça de Francesc Macià, Calle Princesa to Carrer de Pablo Iglesias, Calle Fernando to Carrer de Fivaller, Conde del Asalto to Carrer Nou de la Rambla, Marqués del Duero to Francesc Layret, María Victoria to Victòria Republicana, Cuarenta Metros to Carles Marx (now Vía Julia), Salón de San Juan to Fermín Galán, Passeig de Sant Joan to García Hernández (Diagonal-Gràcia section), Santísima Trinidad del Monte to Herois Republicans de Sarrià, and Marqués de l'Argentera to Eduard Maristany — a curious change, because it was the same person. Streets were also dedicated to Salvador Seguí, Francisco Ferrer y Guardia, Pau Sabater, Prats de Molló, Santiago Rusiñol, Anselm Turmeda, and Bernat Metge.

In the following years there were few changes: in 1932 Tetuàn square was changed to Hermenegildo Giner de los Ríos, and Alcalá Zamora square (now Francesc Macià) was created; in 1933 Sant Jeróni was changed to Cèsar August Torras, Marquès de Foronda to Arturo Masriera, Pare Claret to Mutualitat, and Cameros to Amadeu Vives; and, in 1934, Garriga Bachs square to Josep Llimona, Crisantemos to Joan Gamper, and a few others of lesser relevance. In 1934 several streets that still had no name were baptized: Sabino de Arana, Bori i Fontestà, Valentí i Camp, and Josep Bertran, while Pau Casals was moved from an alley in La Verneda to a new avenue located between Diagonal and Turó Park.

During the Conservative Biennium (1934–1936) the new mayor, Joan Pich y Pon, established several provisions regarding the nomenclature: respect for the names established in 1934; granting new names to new streets; plaques in Spanish and Catalan placed alternately; adding biographical information to the plaques of personalities; and written request from neighbors to endorse new names. The new consistory introduced few novelties, the main one being the naming of a new square at the intersection of Diagonal and Gran Via de Carles III after Alejandro Lerroux (now Maria Cristina).

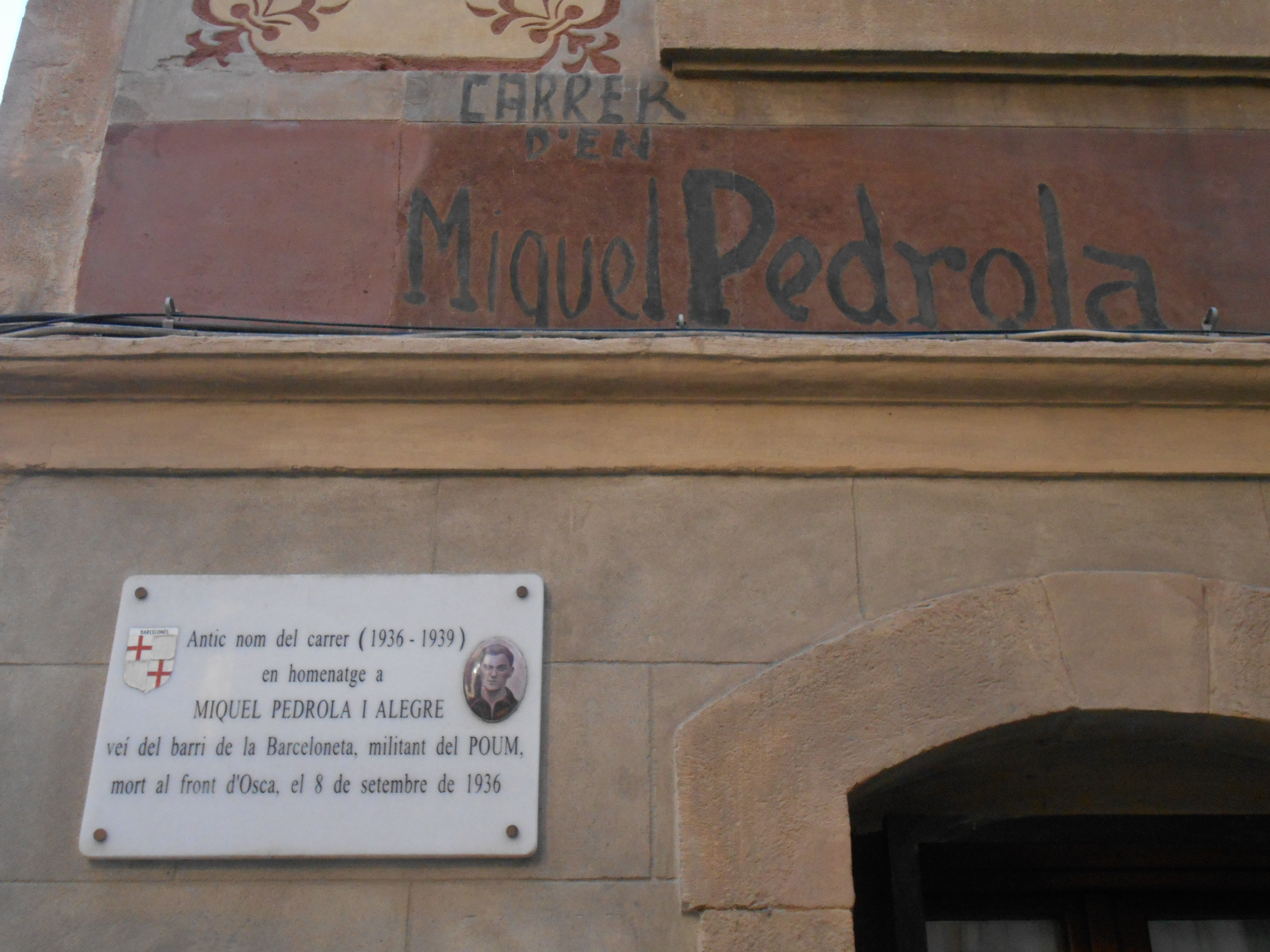
Miquel Pedrola Street (currently Sant Miquel), with the old inscription and a plaque commemorating the POUM militiaman, who died at the front of Huesca in 1936.

During the Civil War, popular fervor led to the change of numerous public roads without even official approval or the placement of a plaque, simply the name written on the wall. Numerous names established during the dictatorship of Primo de Rivera that had been maintained during the Republic were reversed. Numerous streets with religious names were also changed, preferably those in the center of the city. Other changes were of a political nature or in memory of union leaders or militiamen and combatants in the war. Most of the changes were made in the first months of the war, and many of them were confirmed by the City Council on September 16, 1937; however, some of the changes of spontaneous sign remained only in the popular collective ideology. The only change made on the initiative of the consistory presided by Carles Pi i Sunyer was that of Urquinaona square by Francesc Ferrer i Guàrdia, on November 19, 1936.

The new names were labeled in most cases simply in tar, although in a few cases handmade plaques were placed, as in Vía Laietana, renamed Via Durruti, where a plaque made by the sculptor Enric Boleda was placed; or in Ferrer i Guàrdia's square, with a medallion with the effigy of the deceased. However, these plaques were destroyed in 1939.

Among the changes approved by the city council in 1937 were the following: Passeig de Gràcia to Pi i Margall, Avinguda de Borbó to Mariscal Joffre, General Martínez Anido to Passeig de Maragall, Concordia to Sitio del 1714, Plaça d'Alcalá Zamora to Germans Badia, Mediana de Sant Pere to Santiago Salvador, Avinguda de la Mare de Déu de Montserrat to Francisco Ascaso, Vergara to Antoni López Raimundo, Plaça de Sant Josep Oriol to Milicià Desconegut, Bisbe Irurita to Federico García Lorca, Pla de Palau to Àngel Ganivet, Santa Anna to Màrtirs de Montjuïc, Plaça de l'Àngel to Dostoyevski, Alta to Espàrtac, Peris Mencheta to Friedrich Engels, Carme to Kropotkin, Plaça de Sant Agustí Vell to Néstor Majnó, Passeig de la Bonanova to Errico Malatesta, Plaça del Canonge Rodó to Mártires de Chicago, Avinguda d'Icària to Revolució Social, Bisbe Laguarda to Revolució de 1936, Santuari to Barricada, Peu de la Creu to Komsomol, Avinguda Meridiana to URSS, Plaça de la Sagrada Familia to Ucraïna, Plaça de Sants to 19 de Juliol, Sant Pau to Rafael Farga Pellicer, Negoci to Víctimes del 19 de Juliol, etc. The ring roads of Sant Antoni, Sant Pau, and Sant Pere were also changed to three anarchist leaders: Tarrida del Mármol, Ricardo Mella, and Fermín Salvochea, respectively.

Many other changes were not approved and remained at the popular level, among which we could highlight: Major de Gràcia to Germinal Vidal, Sant Pere Màrtir to Amadeu Colldeforns, Sant Frederic to Màrtirs de Sants, Marquàs de la Mina to Capità Arrando, Santo Domingo de Santa Catalina to Sargento de Milicias Francesc Vila, San Honorato to Teniente Coronel Díaz Sandino, Plaça de Sant Just to Largo Caballero, Foradada to Bakunin, Avenida del Portal de l'Àngel to Doctor Pavlov, Baixada de Sant Marià to Pancho Villa, Sanjuanistas to AIT, Plaça de la Trinitat to CNT, Sat Eusebi to FAI, Bertran to POUM, Nuestra Señora del Pilar to Llibertat, Santa Magdalena to Los Rebeldes, Beatas to Anarquistas, Sant Josep de la Muntanya to Pepe l'Alpinista, Nostra Senyora de Gracia to Desgràcia, Madriguera to Espanya, etc.

The last changes, made in 1938, were that of calle de la Industria to Miguel Hidalgo (now Paris) and San Jeróni to Ángel Pestaña.

==== Franco's dictatorship ====
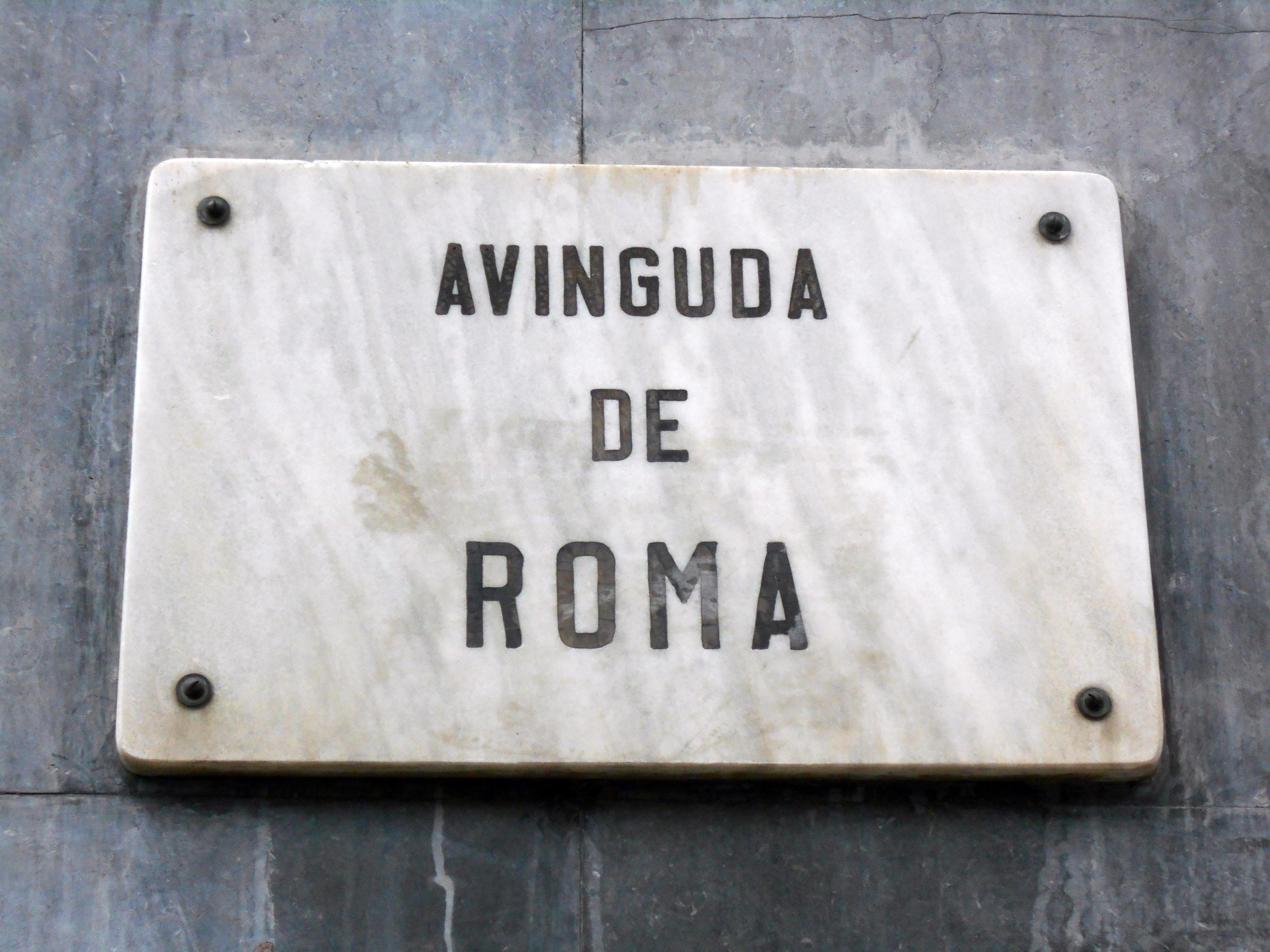
Roma Avenue, as well as Berlin Street, were named after the allies of the Franco dictatorship, Italy and Germany.

The victory of the rebel side and the establishment of Franco's dictatorship led again to the change from Catalan to Spanish and the replacement of many names. All the changes of the Republican era were reversed en bloc. At the beginning, there were a series of changes that were not officially recognized, as happened during the war, and soon after they were disallowed: Passeig de Pi i Margall was named after General Mola, although it finally kept its previous name, Paseo de Gracia; Plaça de Catalunya was renamed Plaza del Ejército Español, but eventually kept its name; Gran Via de les Corts Catalanes was initially dedicated to General Goded, but was officially awarded to José Antonio Primo de Rivera; Via Durruti was assigned to José Antonio, but later recovered the name of Vía Layetana; and Plaça dels Germans Badia was provisionally called Plaza del Ejército Marroquí, but later received the name of Calvo Sotelo.

At a meeting of the Permanent Municipal Commission held on February 25, 1939 it was agreed:

The changes of names of the streets and squares of this city and school groups, in order to honor the heroes and martyrs of the Homeland and erase the memory of the passage of the horde through Barcelona, which sullied it with names of undesirables and foreigners, restoring, in addition, the traditional names of the city.

The same commission agreed on March 7, 1939 "to return the names of all the streets and squares of our city to those they had before April 14, 1931". This meant a radical change without regard for any consideration, without taking into account that not all Republican changes were of political sign, but that there were municipal agreements and changes aimed at alleviating duplicities, which with the reversion occurred again. Names that were not in line with the new regime also reappeared, such as Pau Casals, which in 1934 was changed from an alley in La Verneda to an avenue between Diagonal and Turó Park, previously called Victor Hugo; the former alley was renamed Cristòfor de Domènech, but with the Francoist reversion it became Pau Casals again, while the avenue returned to Victor Hugo, neither of them to the liking of the regime. Finally, the avenue was renamed General Goded, but Pau Casals Street remained until 1961, when the land where it was located was transferred to Sant Adrià de Besós.

Another consequence of the reversion is that several newly developed streets that had been baptized for the first time during the Republic were left without a name, just a number or a letter, which is the usual designation of the new streets until their nomination. Subsequently, the names they had received were reviewed, and in many cases in which they were not names of a political sign, the Republican designation was revalidated.

There were few exceptions to the reversion of names: Tomàs Mieres street did not revert to General Arlegui, as it had been named in 1924; the plaça de la Sagrada Familia kept its name, instead of the General Barrera it received in 1927, perhaps because it was a religious name; nor was Gaudí avenue, which had previously been called General Primo de Rivera, initially changed, but in 1942 the change did occur, which was maintained until 1963, when the general was transferred to Ancha street; The Paseo and Plaza de Maragall, formerly Martínez Anido and Magaz, respectively, also remained, apparently because someone remembered that Maragall had translated Goethe — the Germans were allies of the Franco regime — although Martínez Anido was later given the Paseo de la Industria (now Picasso's).

There were also six exceptions to the reversion policy, all of them to honor the new leaders, approved on March 7, 1939: Avenida Catorce de Abril to Generalísimo Franco (now Avenida Diagonal), Gran Via de las Corts Catalanes to José Antonio Primo de Rivera, Avinguda de Pedralbes to Victòria, Passeig de Fermín Galán to Salón de Víctor Pradera (now Passeig de Lluís Companys), Plaça de los Germans Badia to Calvo Sotelo (now Francesc Macià), and Passeig de García Hernández to General Mola (Paseo de San Juan in its section between Diagonal and Gràcia).

The rest of the public roads returned to their traditional names, as can be seen in a resolution of the Ministry of the Interior of March 1939:

Paseo de Gracia, Plaza de Cataluña, Calle de Fernando, Calle de la Princesa, Las Rondas, Plaza de San Jaime, etc., will return to their old nomenclature, without prejudice to the City Council proceeding to a thorough revision of the names prior to 1931 that recall the antecedents of the Red-Separatist domination of this city, to honor other heroes and martyrs of the National Movement, to whom the roads in the project will also be dedicated.

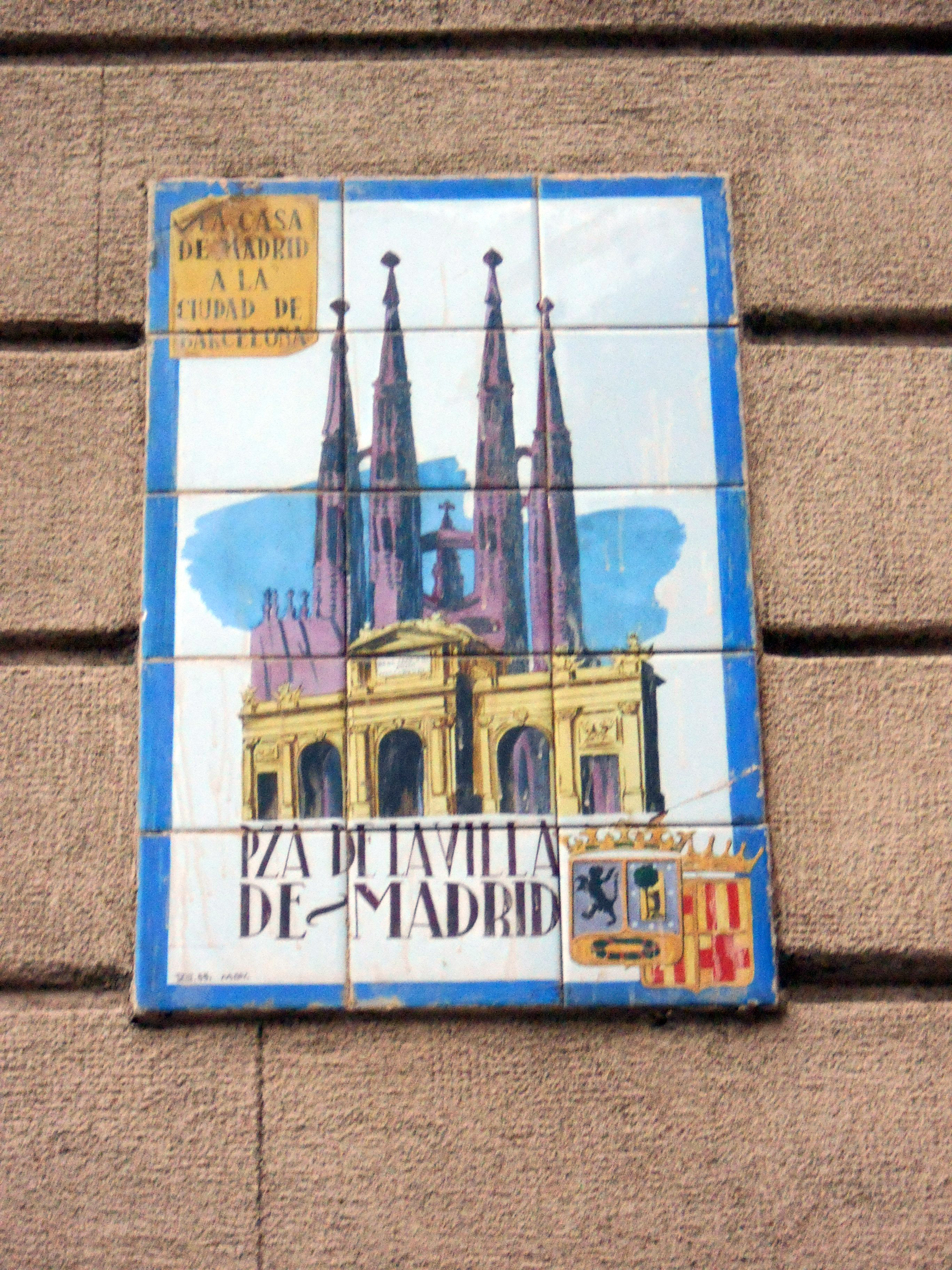
The Plaça de Canuda was renamed de la Villa de Madrid in 1942.

Even so, between 1939 and 1942 several changes took place: Avinguda de Francesc Layret (Paralelo) to Marqués del Duero, Sabino de Arana to General Sanjurjo, Avinguda de Pau Casals to General Goded, Avinguda Presa de les Drassanes to Garcia Morato, Avinguda de la Generalitat to Roma, París (a section) to Berlín, París (another section) to Avenida de Madrid, Tarragona (a section) to Numancia, García Lorca to Obispo Irurita, carretera de Montjuïc to División Azul, plaza de Pi y Margall to Victoria, plaça de la Revolució to Unificación, La Internacional to Nación, plaça de Salvat-Papasseit to Virrey Amat, plaça de Canuda to Villa de Madrid, Llobregat to Párroco Juliana, Robert Robert to Ramiro de Maeztu, etc. Several new streets were also baptized: Alcázar de Toledo, Belchite, Plaza de los Caídos, Plaza de los Héroes de Espinosa de los Monteros, Salvador Anglada and Teniente Coronel González Tablas. In 1940, the square created by the burying of the railroad from Barcelona to Sarriá was named Plaza de Gala Placidia, after the wife of the Visigoth king Ataúlfo, who had his court in Barcelona.

In these years the street of Pau Claris was also eliminated, which was awarded to its extension towards the sea, the Via Layetana, receiving the same name. On the other hand, Calle de Casanova was kept, dedicated to Rafael Casanova, perhaps because the surname alone was not so closely related to the character, and could be understood as belonging to another Casanova. The street of 26 de Enero was also maintained, which commemorated the Catalan victory of 1641 in the Reapers' War, because it coincided with the date of Franco's army entry into Barcelona.

A new regulation of the nomenclature was made in a municipal session held on July 7, 1942, which ratified the reversion of Republican names and the changes made between 1939 and 1942, as well as collecting a series of new changes, some of new streets and others derived from a purge of names prior to the Republic but that had some leftist or Catalanist bias. Some of these changes were: Democràcia to Movimiento Nacional, Autonomia to Unidad, Solidaritat to Rubén Darío, Igualtat to Álava, Joaquim Folguera to Núñez de Arce, Suñer i Capdevila to Beato Almató, Zola to Padre Laínez, Passeig de Castelar to Donoso Cortés, Laureano Figuerola to Nilo Fabra, Mendizábal to Junta de Comercio, Pere Joan Sala to General Almirante, Pau Alsina to Secretario Coloma, Josep Nonell to Alcalde de Móstoles, etc.

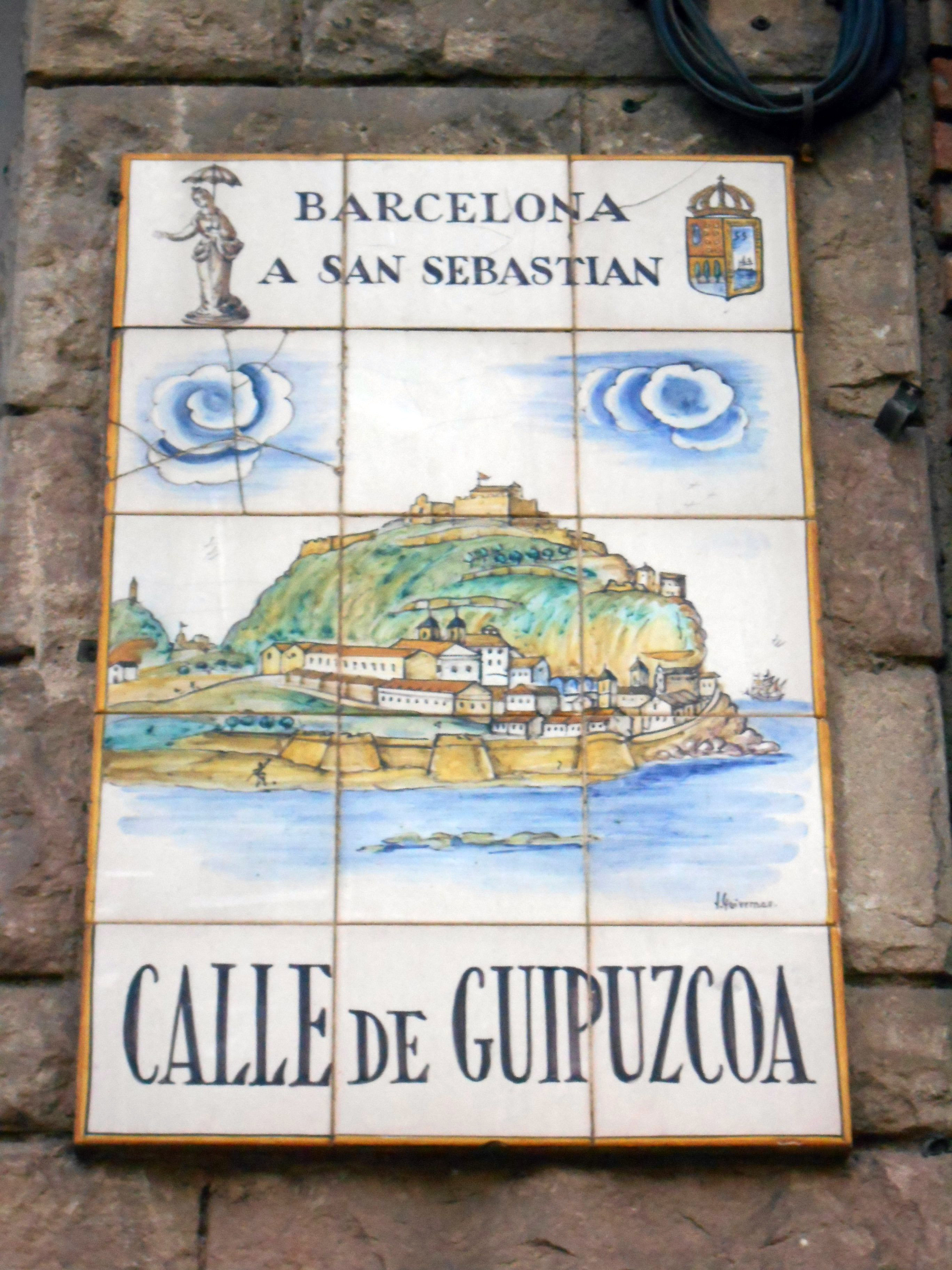
Calle de Guipúzcoa (now Rambla de Guipúscoa), named in 1942.

The new gazetteer, published in 1943, also stipulated the labeling in Spanish. Some of the translations were not very rigorous: Carrer dels Ases ("donkeys") became Calle de los Ases; Carrer del Voló (a village in Vallespir) became Calle del Balón. On the other hand, some names in Catalan remained, such as Foc Follet ("fatuous fire"), Mare Eterna ("eternal mother", in allusion to nature, title of a work by Ignasi Iglésias) and Barri Vermell ("red neighborhood", perhaps not translated because of its possible association with political color). The incorporation of Catalan characters that did not have political significance was also allowed in specific cases, as in the new urbanizations of Sabastida (Vilapicina), with names such as Escultor Llimona, Pintor Casas, Pintor Mir, and Santiago Rusiñol; or Can Mora, in Sarrià, where the streets Pedro II de Moncada, Jaime II, and Elisenda de Pinós were created.

Among the new names introduced by the new authorities were many of a religious nature, mainly founders of religious orders (Mother Vedruna, Father Alegre, Saint John Baptist de la Salle, Saint Louise de Marillac) and parish priests (Mosén Amadeo Oller, Father Juliana, Father Oliveras, Father Bundó, Father Pérez del Pulgar, Father Luis Artigues).

A new reform of the gazetteer took place on March 4, 1947. New names of Catalan personalities were introduced, possibly due to the new orientation derived from the defeat of the Franco regime's allies in World War II. They appeared as follows: Joaquim Ruyra, Cèsar August Torras, Joan Gamper, Hipólito Lázaro, Francisco Gimeno, Lluís Millet, Apel-les Mestres, Adrià Gual, Enric Clarasó, etc. It was also agreed to name the streets dedicated to characters with a qualifier that indicated their activity: Pintor Pahissa, Cardenal Cisneros, General Álvarez de Castro, Maestro Albéniz, Doctor Balari Jovany, Almirante Barceló, etc.

In 1948, the Merced industrial estate in Pedralbes was urbanized, which received names linked to Falangism: Cinco Rosas (after the anthem Cara al sol), Luceros (idem), 29 de Octubre (date of the founding speech of the Falange Española by José Antonio Primo de Rivera), Hermanos Noya, Ruiz de la Hermosa, Manuel Mateo, Ramiro Ledesma and Onésimo Redondo.

Another urbanization in 1950 was the neighborhood of Horta, in Nou Barris, whose streets were named with toponyms from the Balearic Islands: Lluchmajor, Sóller, Ciudad de Mallorca, Alc´dia, Valldemossa, Pollença, Deiá, Andratx, Porto Cristo, Lluch, Felanitx, Formentor, Bunyola and Jardins d'Alfàbia.

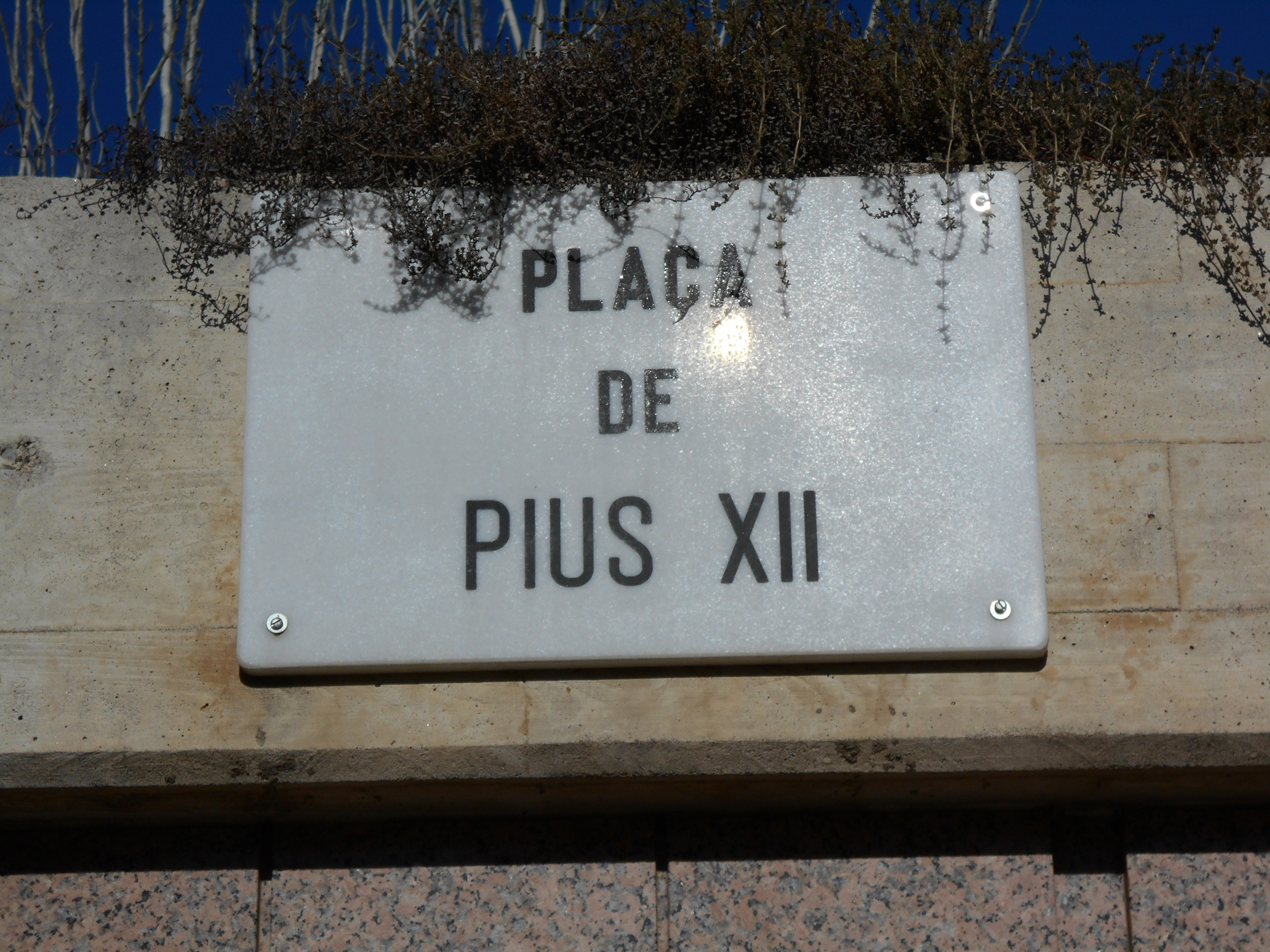
Plaça de Pius XII, one of the epicenters of the XXXV International Eucharistic Congress.

An urban landmark of the time was the celebration in 1952 of the XXXV International Eucharistic Congress, which allowed the urbanization of a new neighborhood known as El Congreso. The center of the new neighborhood was named Plaza del Congreso Eucarístico, and the new streets were given names linked to the event: Doctor Modrego, Cardenal Tedeschini and Cardenal Cicognani, as well as the streets of La Vid and La Espiga, elements linked to the Eucharist. Plaza de Pío XII, another of the congress venues, was also created.

In 1953 the neighborhood of La Font de la Guatlla was urbanized, whose streets were named after flowers: Begonia, Crisantemo, Dalia, Hortensia, Jazmín and Loto. That year the Paseo de la Verneda, a neighborhood of Sant Martí de Provençals, was also created; the name comes from being an area of alders (vern in Catalan).

In 1957 the first section of the Passeig Marítim was opened, an idea that had emerged in the 1920s but had not yet been developed. It has several names depending on the stretch of coastline: Barceloneta, Port Olímpic, Nova Icària, Bogatell, and Mar Bella.

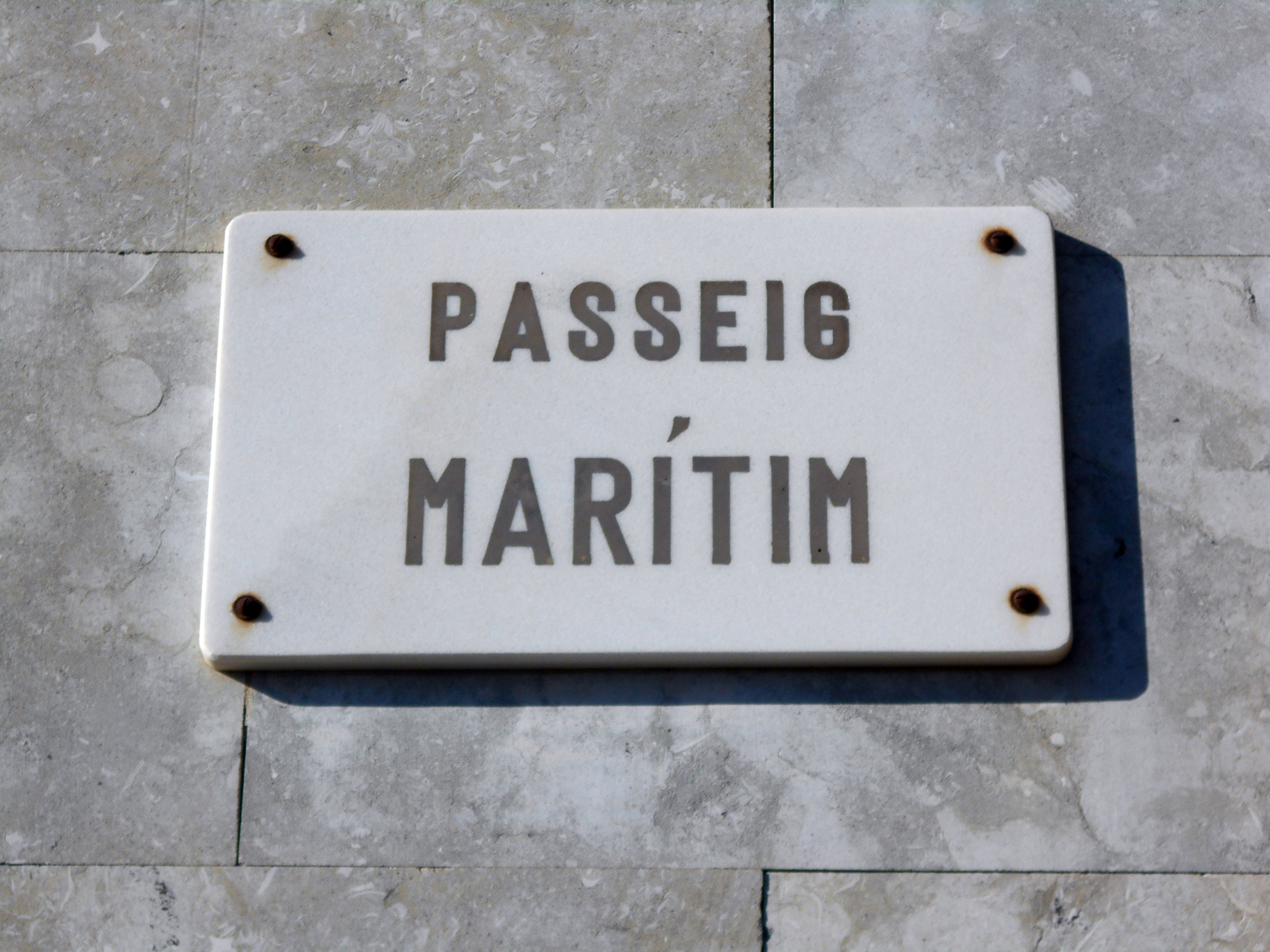
Passeig Marítim.

Between 1957 and 1973, José María de Porcioles was mayor, a long term of office known as the "Porciolista era", which stood out in urban planning for its unbridled speculation in real estate. During his mandate the city grew exponentially, due to the emergence of new neighborhoods to accommodate the strong immigration received at the time. Numerous streets were named after the regime's personalities, such as the Falangists Roberto Bassas or Matías Montero, or names such as Mártires de la Tradición or Primera Centuria Catalana.

Most of the streets of the Porciolista era arose from the creation of large housing estates, such as Montbau (1958–1961), Southwest Besòs (1959–1960) or Canyelles (1974). The streets of Montbau were baptized with names alluding to the arts: Architecture, Sculpture, Painting, Ceramics, Music, Poetry, Dance, Song, Pantomime, Mime, Lyric, Rhythm, Harmony, Muses; or artists, such as Vayreda, Sorolla, Roig Solé, Clarà Ayats, Benlliure, Puig i Cadafalch, Domènech i Montaner, Arquitecto Martorell, Zuloaga, and Zurbarán.

In the Southwest of the Besós some of the streets were named after cities in Occitania and Northern Catalonia: Béziers, Carcasona, Foix, Muret, Narbona, Pau, Perpiñán, Prades, Tarbes, and Toulouse. Others from Italian localities: Alcamo, Benevento, Cáller, Catania, Marsala, Messina, Oristán, Otranto, Palermo, Salerno, Sácer, Tarento, and Trapani. Finally, several were dedicated to Greece and surrounding countries: Albania, Chipre, Constantinopla, Epiro, Rodas, Croya, and Tesalia.

In Canyelles, the streets were dedicated to literary figures: Antonio Machado, Federico García Lorca, Miguel Hernández, Juan Ramón Jiménez, Miguel de Unamuno, Isabel de Villena, Ignasi Agustí, and Carles Soldevila; also one to the Chilean singer Víctor Jara.

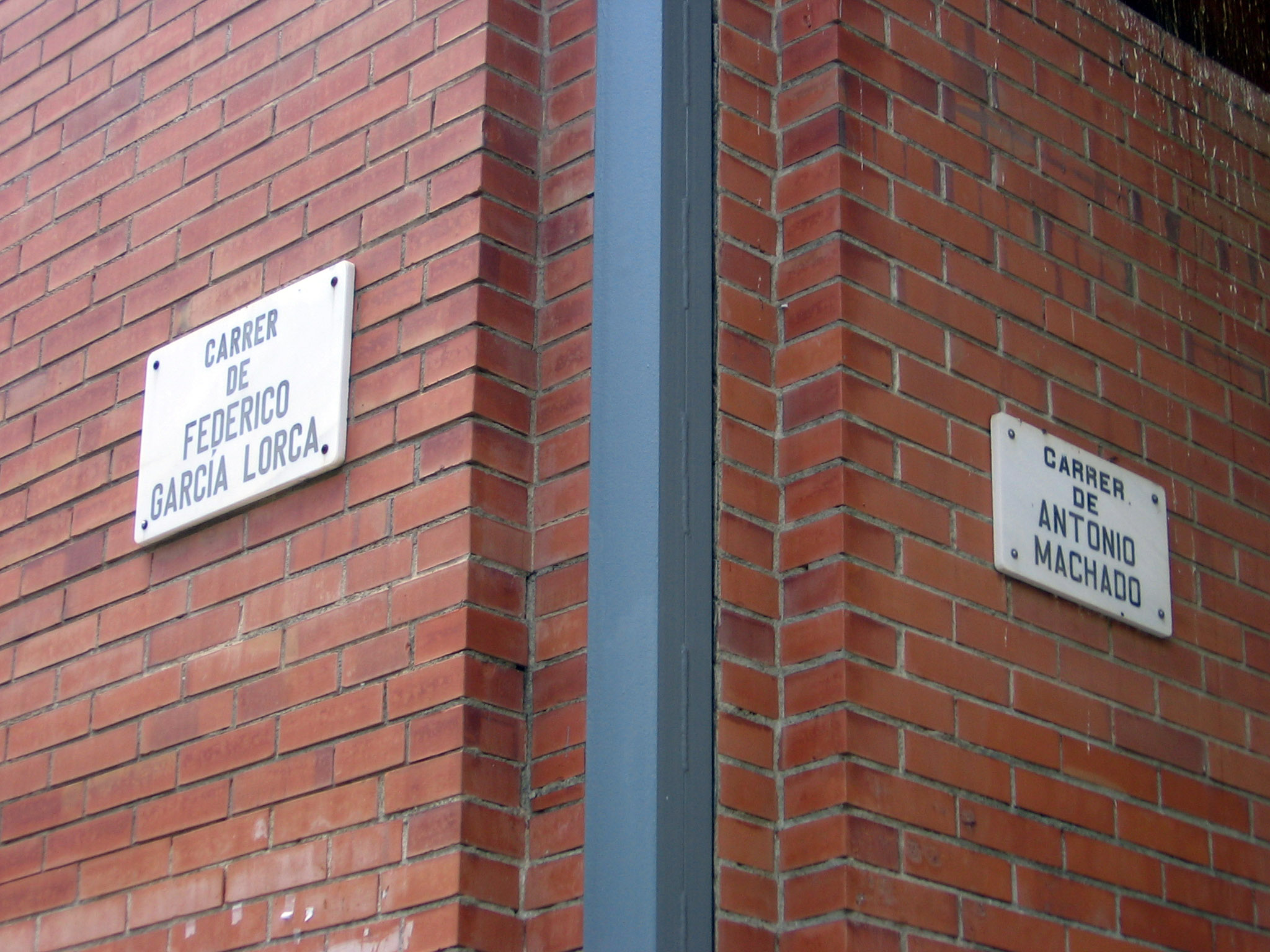
Corner of Federico García Lorca and Antonio Machado streets, Canyelles.

Between 1958 and 1965 the Zona Franca, an industrial sector located between the mountain of Montjuïc, the port and the Llobregat River, was urbanized. Its main thoroughfare is the Passeig de la Zona Franca, which is part of the Ronda del Mig. Many of the streets in this area were named with letters — for the north-south direction – and numbers — east-west direction. Several other streets were baptized with names related to industry: Steel, Iron, Aluminum, Nickel, Mercury, Cobalt, Lead, Tin, Copper, Bronze, Platinum, Uranium, Blast Furnaces, Fire, Energy, Foundry, Mining, Mechanics, Metallurgy, Physics, Chemistry, Mathematics, Engines, Anvil, Die and Chisel. A sector of the Free Zone near the port was named in 1994 after seas, oceans and straits: Atlantic, Arctic, Antarctic, Indian, Yellow Sea, Red Sea, Aral, Martinique, Suez, Malacca, Hormuz, and Dardanelles. Also located there is the main wholesale market of the city, Mercabarna, which is divided into several streets, the main one of which is the calle Mayor de Mercabarna, while the rest is divided into streets named according to their direction, Longitudinal or Transversal, plus a number.

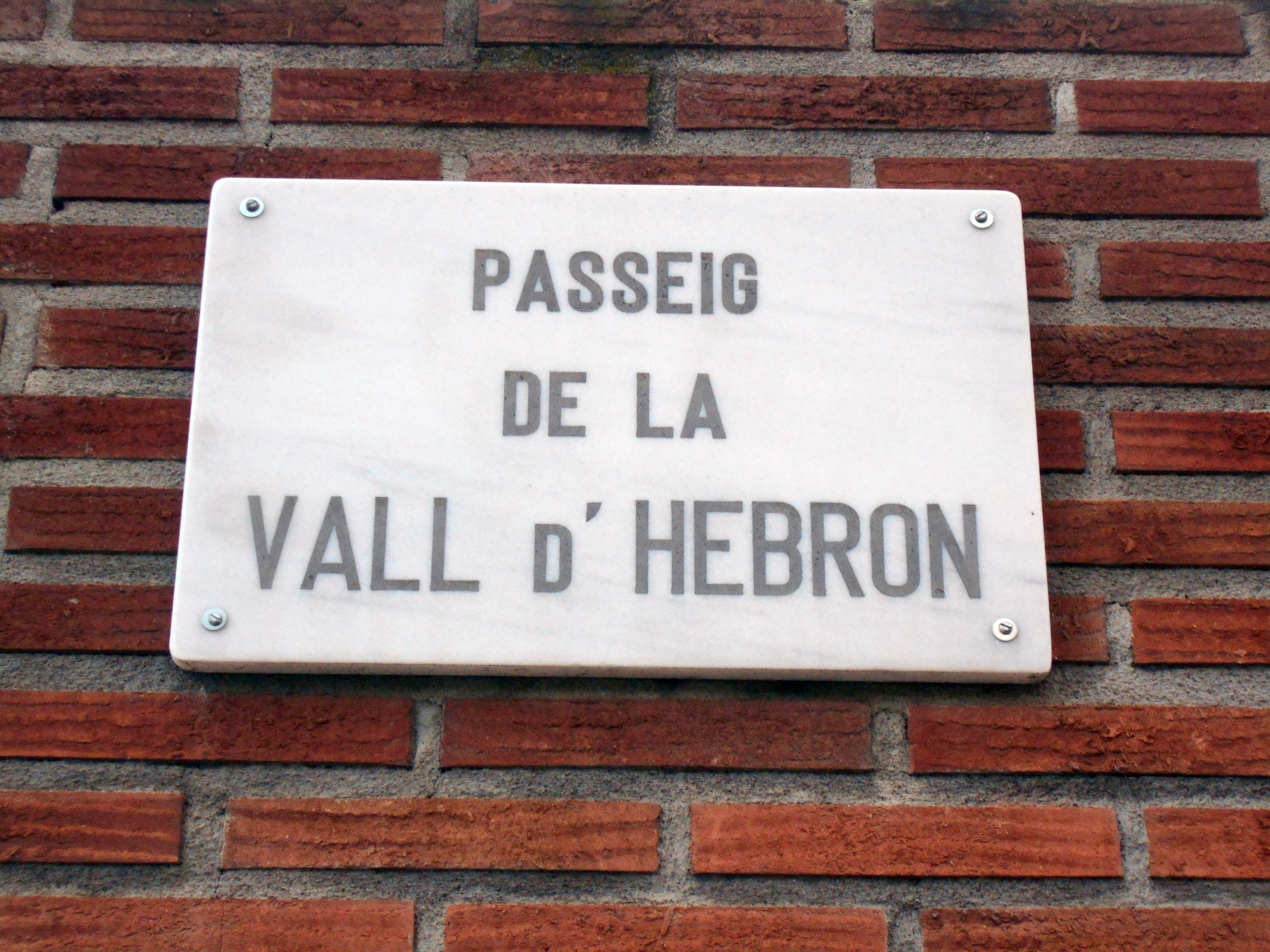
Paseo del Valle de Hebrón.

In some cases, the naming of new streets was left to the whim of an official, such as a sector of the Carmelo neighborhood, whose streets were baptized in 1959 with names of towns in Guadalajara because the official had been made to memorize them as a child: thus, the Plaza Pastrana and the streets Sacedón, Trillo, Jadraque, Sigüenza, and Cifuentes. Also in 1959 the Plaza de Alfonso el Sabio was created, dedicated to King Alfonso X of Castile.

In 1959 the Vall d'Hebron neighborhood was also urbanized, whose name comes from an old monastery located in the area and disappeared in 1835, called Sant Jeroni del Vall d'Hebron, in allusion to the Palestinian city. Its main thoroughfare is the Hebron Valley promenade, which is part of the Dalt ring road; there is also a square and a park with the same name. In keeping with the name of the neighborhood, the surrounding streets were given biblical names: Betania, Canaán, Getsemaní, Gólgota, Haifa, Idumea, Jericó, Jordán, Judea, Megido, Monte Tabor, Naín, Nazaret, Nínive, Palestina, Samaria, Sidón, and Tiro.

In the following years there were few changes, the most notable being the dedication of a section of Avenida de la Catedral to Francisco Cambó in 1972, or the conversion of the upper section of Avenida Meridiana en Rio de Janeiro in 1973. In the 1960s a road was opened next to the parish church of Sant Andreu del Palomar that received different names depending on the section (Salón Teniente Coronel Onofre Mata, Iglesia, Guardiola i Feliu), but in 1979 it was renamed as a whole as Passeig de Torras i Bages, after the ecclesiastic, philosopher and writer Josep Torras i Bages.

Finally, it is worth mentioning the creation of several green spaces during this period: parque de Monterols, by the homonymous hill (1947); jardines del Mirador del Alcalde, by Mayor Porcioles (1962–1969); parque de Cervantes, by the writer (1965); jardines de Jaume Vicens i Vives, by the historian (1967); jardines de Mossèn Costa i Llobera, by the priest and poet (1970); jardines de Mossèn Cinto Verdaguer, by the priest and poet (1970); jardines de Joan Maragall, for the poet (1970); etc.

==== Democracy ====
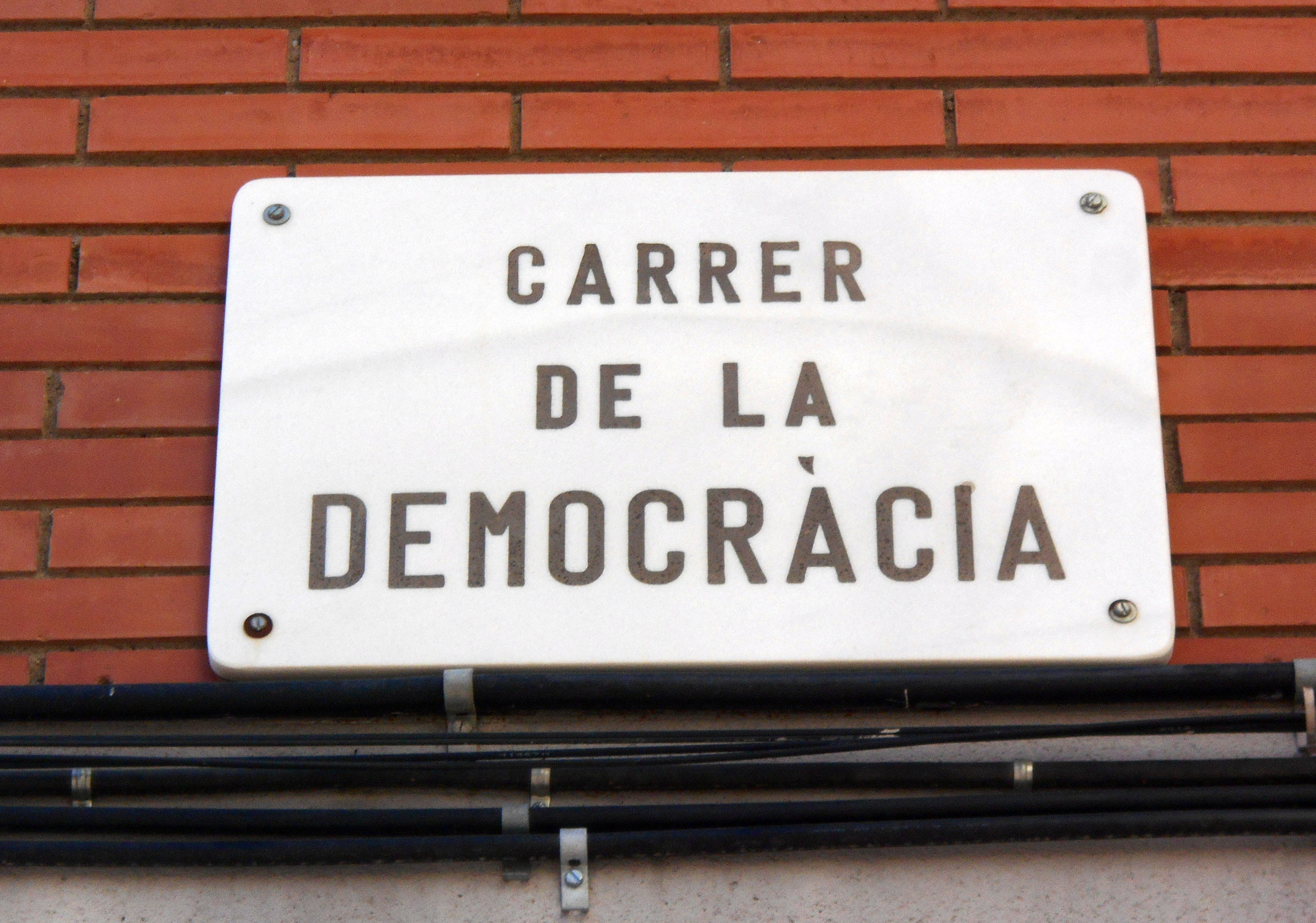
Democracia street.

The arrival of democracy again meant a profound change in the nomenclature, both by the alternation of the language again from Spanish to Catalan, as well as by the change of numerous names of public roads. The first decisions of the first transition consistory, presided over by Joaquín Viola, were three: bilingual labeling for all the streets of Ciutat Vella; taking into account the popular will of the residents of Sant Andreu so that the street of Orden would be called Ignasi Iglésias, as in the times of the Republic; and also returning the avenue of General Goded to Pau Casals — although the name of the general was transferred to a section of the Infanta Carlota avenue, between Diagonal and the Sarrià road.

During the mayoral term of Josep Maria Socías (1976–1979) there were only two changes: to return to the street of Sant Andreu the name of Mayor, and to return the name of Icària to the avenue of López Varela.

The situation changed with the triumph of the Socialists' Party of Catalonia (PSC) in the municipal elections of 1979, which gave access to the mayor's office to Narcís Serra. The new consistory was more receptive to popular demands, which called for the return to the pre-dictatorship names, as well as signage in Catalan. In these years of transition, several popular initiatives arose for the recovery of old names, among them a proposal of the Congress of Catalan Culture. On the other hand, in numerous streets and squares some people and groups took the initiative to change the names or translate them into Catalan, even if it was through graffiti or printed papers placed on the street signs. Likewise, neighborhood associations proposed new names for streets inaugurated during the dictatorship and which had no previous name; thus, on December 20, 1979, the city council approved the change of the Paseo de los Mártires de la Tradición to Rambla de l'Onze de Setembre (the National Day of Catalonia).

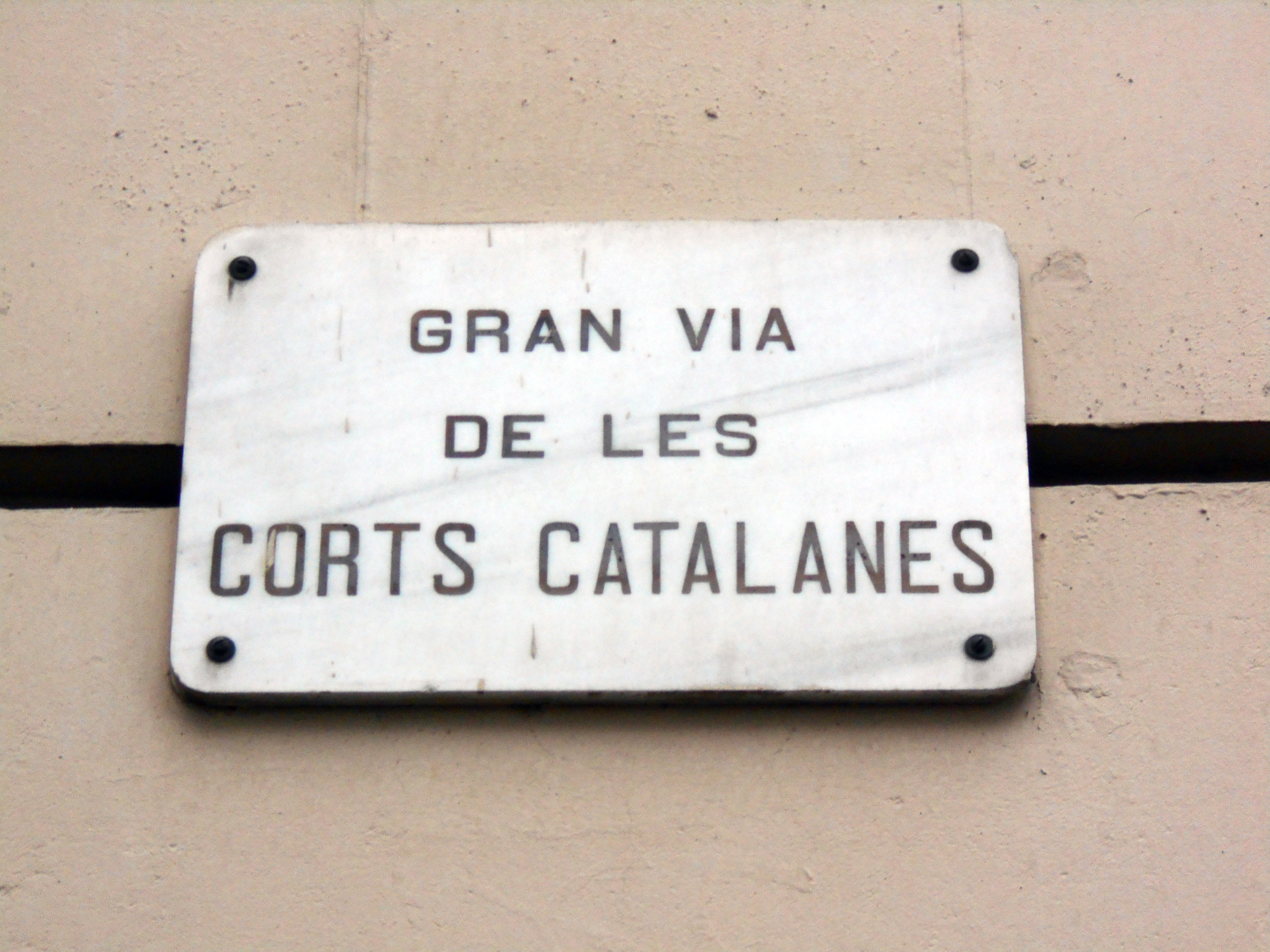
The Gran Via de les Corts Catalanes recovered its name in 1979.

The new city council did not practice the policy of automatic reversion that was done during the Franco dictatorship, but studied all the cases one by one. In fact, many of the names established in the previous period were kept. The first decision of the consistorial team (June 22, 1979) was to return four important streets to their traditional names: Avenida del Generalísimo Franco became Avinguda Diagonal; Avenida José Antonio Primo de Rivera became Gran Via de les Corts Catalanes; Calle del Marqués del Duero became Avinguda del Paral·lel again; and Calle del General Primo de Rivera became Carrer Ample again.

The main change of names was approved on December 21, 1979, when a total of 59 streets recovered their previous name or received a new one. Among the changes, Paseo de Sant Joan (a section of which was previously called General Mola) and Avenida de la Infanta Carlota (a section of which was dedicated to General Goded) were returned to their full names; and Via Laietana was divided again between the homonymous section and Carrer de Pau Claris. Among the roads that regained their names were: Autonomia, Democràcia, Avinguda de les Drassanes, carrer Nou de la Rambla, Ramon Turró, Avinguda de Pedralbes, Riego, Prats de Molló, Avinguda del Tibidabo, plaça del Verdun, plaça de Vallvidrera, etc. The streets dedicated to Falangists in the Mercè neighborhood were dedicated to geographical features — except Ramiro Ledesma and Onésimo Redondo, which were not changed until 1983. Several others received new names: Francesc Macià, Lluís Companys, Prat de la Riba, Pi i Margall, Sabino de Arana, Pablo Neruda, Picasso, Bosch i Gimpera, Carrasco i Formiguera, Aristide Maillol, Eduard Toldrà, Joaquim Blume, Julián Besteiro and Lázaro Cárdenas.

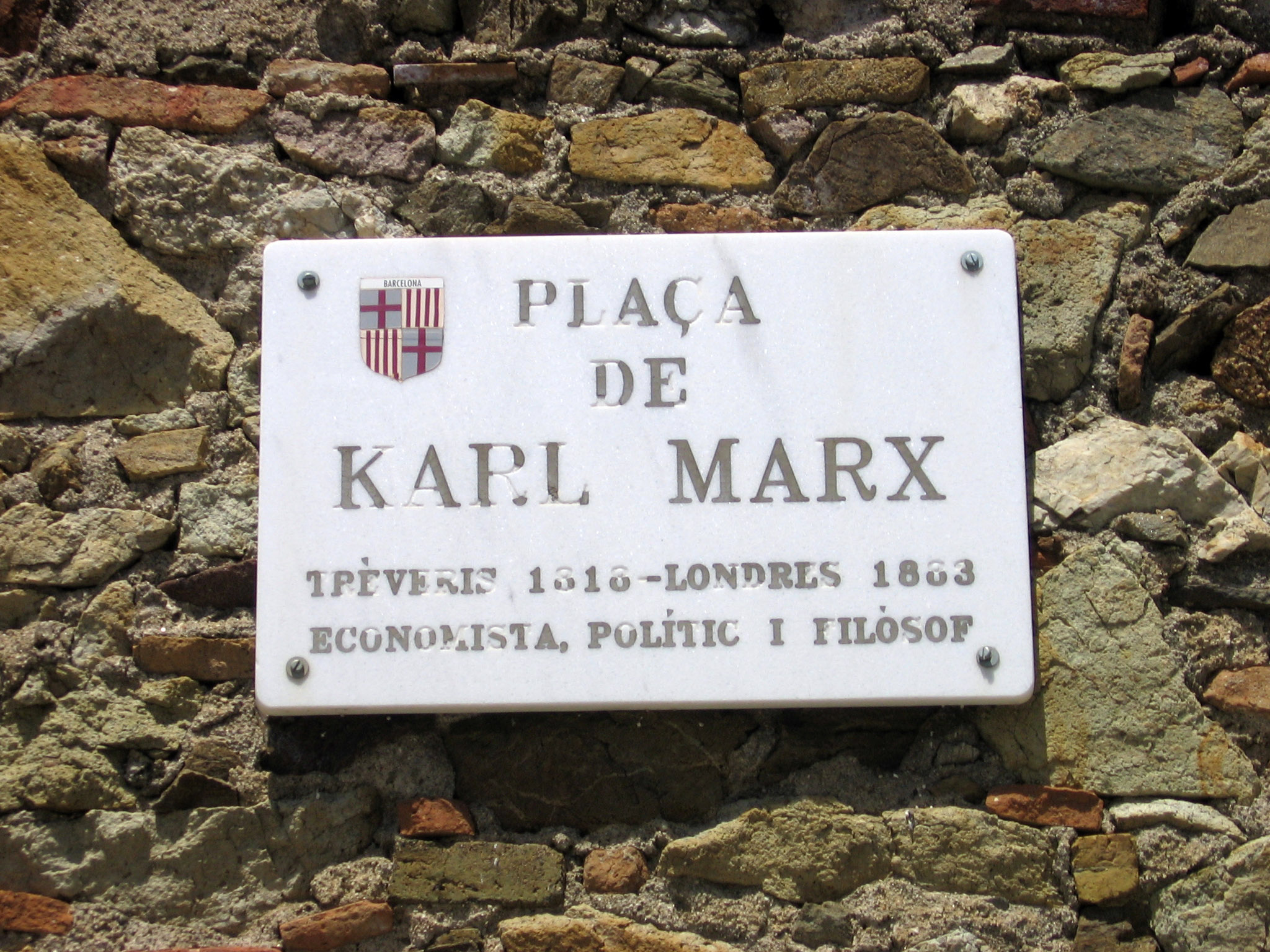
Plaça de Karl Marx.

In 1980 a Nomenclàtor de les vies públiques (gazetteer of public roads) was published that included the new changes made in the naming of streets, but nevertheless noted numerous gaps in the meaning of some of the streets of ancient origin. It was then proposed the attribution of unknown streets to homonymous characters listed in the Gran Enciclopèdia Catalana, a fact that, however, distorted their initial attribution. Thus, for example, Calvet Street was dedicated to the poet and playwright Damas Calvet i de Budallès; however, it was later found out that it came from the owner of the land, Maria del Remei Calvet i Sagrera, so the dedication was changed again. The new version of the Gazetteer of 1996, in which more time was dedicated to research, corrected many of these errors and gaps.

Between 1979 and 1981 several streets in Vallvidrera, Rectoret, and Can Caralleu, neighborhoods in the periphery that still had several streets duplicated with the city center, were changed. In these places the decision of the new names was left to the neighbors themselves. Most of them were dedicated to trees and plants, as well as some of them were named after operas (Parsifal, Lohengrin, La Traviata, Bohemios, Madame Butterfly) or names related to astronomy (Firmament, Satellites, Ursa Major, Nebulae, Milky Way, Mars, Jupiter, Saturn). The streets Mayor de Can Caralleu and Mayor del Rectoret were also created.

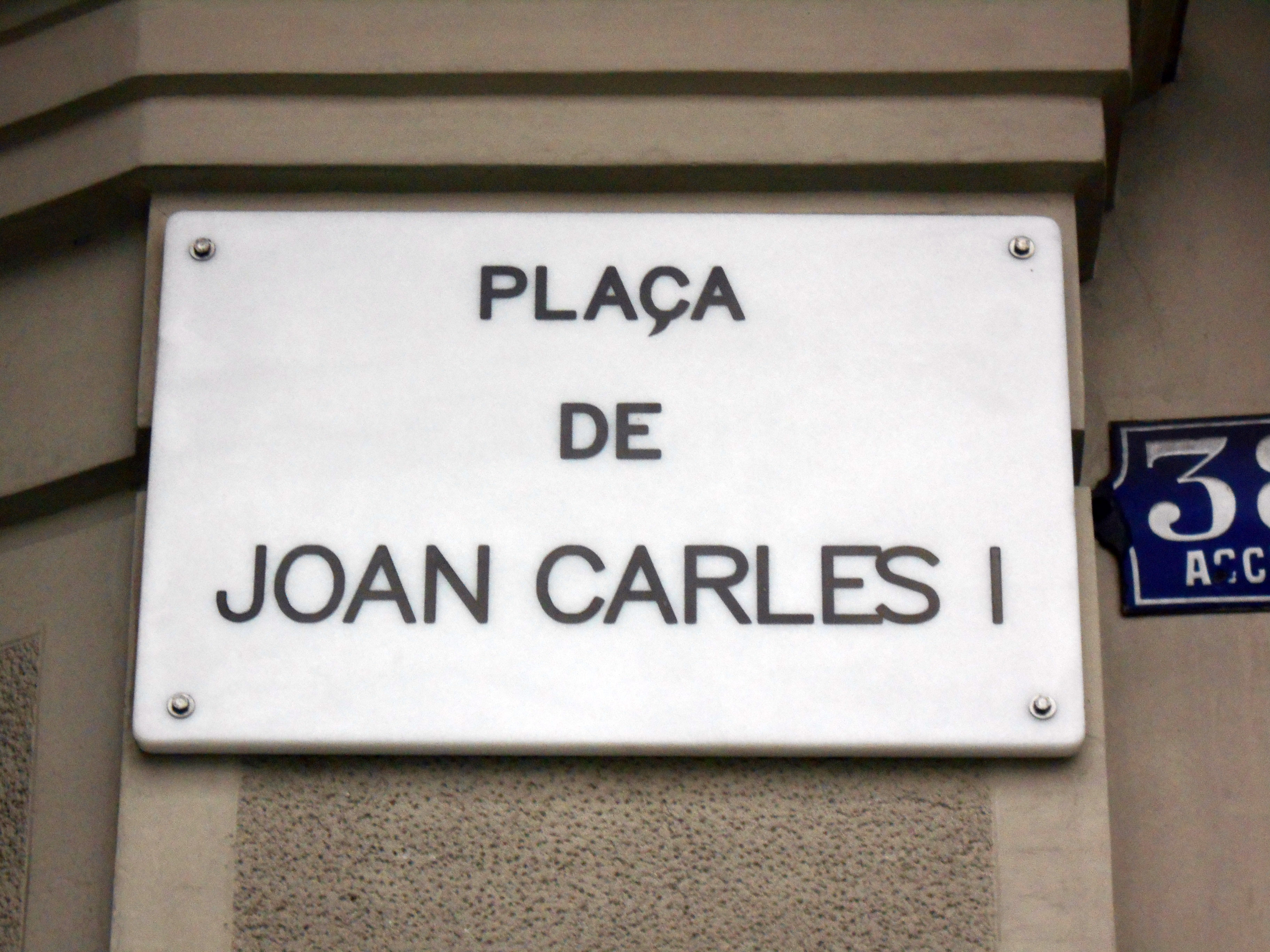
Plaque of the old plaça de Joan Carles I, nowadays plaça del Cinc d'Oros

In 1980 two squares were created in Nou Barris dedicated to characters linked to the left: Francesc Layret, lawyer and deputy for the Partit Republicà Català; and Ángel Pestaña, anarcho-syndicalist politician and leader of Solidaridad Obrera.

Also between 1980 and 1981 the name of several streets that placed a qualifier before the name of the honored personage was modified, leaving only that name, among them several streets dedicated to musicians that all had the appellative Mestre. Some examples would be: Sculptor Enric Clarasó to Enric Clarasó, Decorator José María Sert to Josep Maria Sert, Pharmacist Carbonell to Francesc Carbonell, Lieutenant Colonel González Tablas to González Tablas, Pope John XXIII to John XXIII, Bishop Urquinaona to Urquinaona, Jurist Borrell i Soler to Borrell i Soler, Aviators Jiménez and Iglesias to Jiménez and Iglesias, Lawyer Ballbé to Manuel Ballbé, etc.

In 1981 several minor changes took place: the dedication of the plaça de la Fony Màgica to its author, Carles Buïgas; the awarding of the plaza de la Victoria to Juan Carlos I, in recognition of his actions during the coup d'état of February 23rd; the square popularly known as Plaça de les Rates was baptized as Plaça de l'Assemblea de Catalunya; and the squares of Wagner, Salvador Seguí, Emili Vendrell, Torres Clavé and Joan Llongueras were created.

In the following years there were several changes, among which it is worth mentioning: Obispo Irurita to Bisbe (1982), Encants to Consolat de Mar (1982), Plaza de la Unificación to Plaça de la Revolució de Setembre de 1868 (1983), Paseo de la Ciudad de Mallorca (a section) to Passeig d'Andreu Nin (1984), Plaza del Funicular to Plaça del Doctor Andreu (1984), Paseo de Colón (a section) to Passeig de Josep Carner (1984), Paseo del Triunfo to Rambla del Pueblo Nuevo (1987), Menéndez Pelayo to Torrent de l'Olla (1989) and Valldaura to Pablo Iglesias (1991).

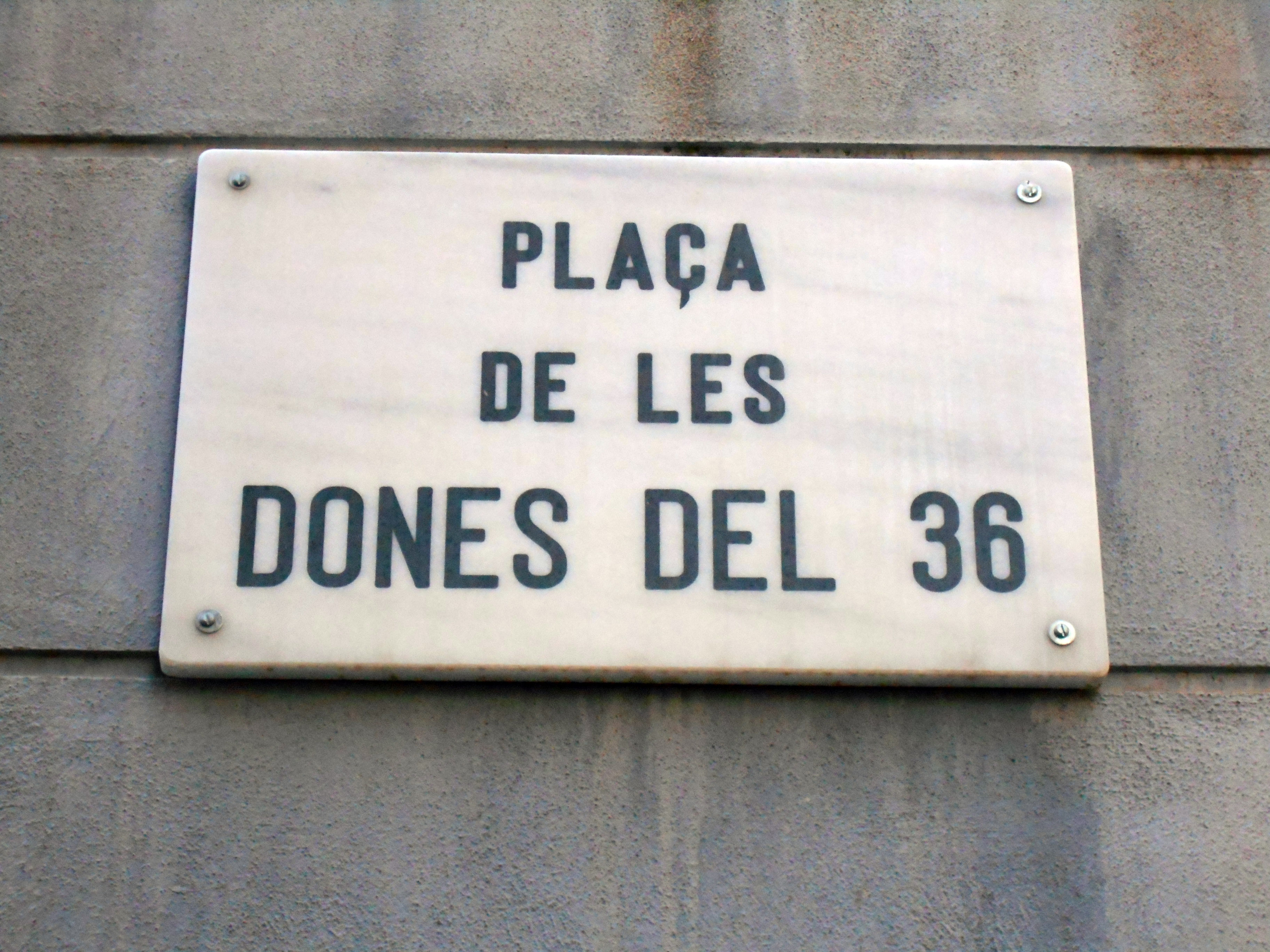
Plaça de les Dones del 36.

Also in those years, new streets were born and received their first names, among them: Plaça de Charlie Rivel (1984), Plaça de la Hispanitat (1984), Plaça de John F. Kennedy (1984), Plaça de Salvador Allende (1984), Plaça de Karl Marx (1984), Carrer de los Segadores (1987), Carrer de Josep Irla i Bosch (1988), Plaça dels Països Catalans (1989), Passeig de Don Quixot (1990), Plaça de Diagonal Mar (1991), etc.

New parks were also created, such as Joan Miró Park (1980–1982), after the painter; Espanya Industrial Park (1981–1985), after the factory of that name; Creueta del Coll Park (1981–1987), a traditional place name ("little cross on the hill"); Pegaso Park (1982–1986), after the factory of the same name; Clot Park (1982–1986), after the factory of the same name; that of Clot (1982–1986), for the neighborhood; that of Sant Martí (1985), for the old municipality; that of Villa Cecilia (1986), for Cecilia Gómez del Olmo, owner of the land; and that of Estació del Nord (1988), for the bus station of the same name.

Another of the concerns of the new democratic city councils has been the recovery of women's names for the dedication of public spaces, in order to balance their presence by reducing the disparity with the male gender. Thus, public streets such as the Plaça de Juliana Morell (nun and poet), the Pasatge de Magdalena Giralt (wife of General Josep Moragues who was imprisoned for defending the memory of her husband), the Calle de Otília Castellví (poumista militiaman), or the Jardins d'Emma de Barcelona (founder of the monastery of Sant Joan de les Abadeses), to cite just a few examples. Public spaces have also been dedicated to international female figures such as Rosa Luxemburg, Frida Kahlo, Isadora Duncan, Marie Curie, Sarah Bernhardt, Simone de Beauvoir, Virginia Woolf and Anne Frank. On the other hand, there are also collective dedications, such as the Plaça de las Dones del 36, the Plaça de les Heroïnes de Girona, the Jardins de les Sufragistes Catalanes, the Plaça de les Dones de Ravensbrück, the Plaça de les Madres de la Plaza de Mayo, the Plaça de les Llevadores d'Horta or the Plaça de les Dones de Nou Barris.

==== The Olympics ====
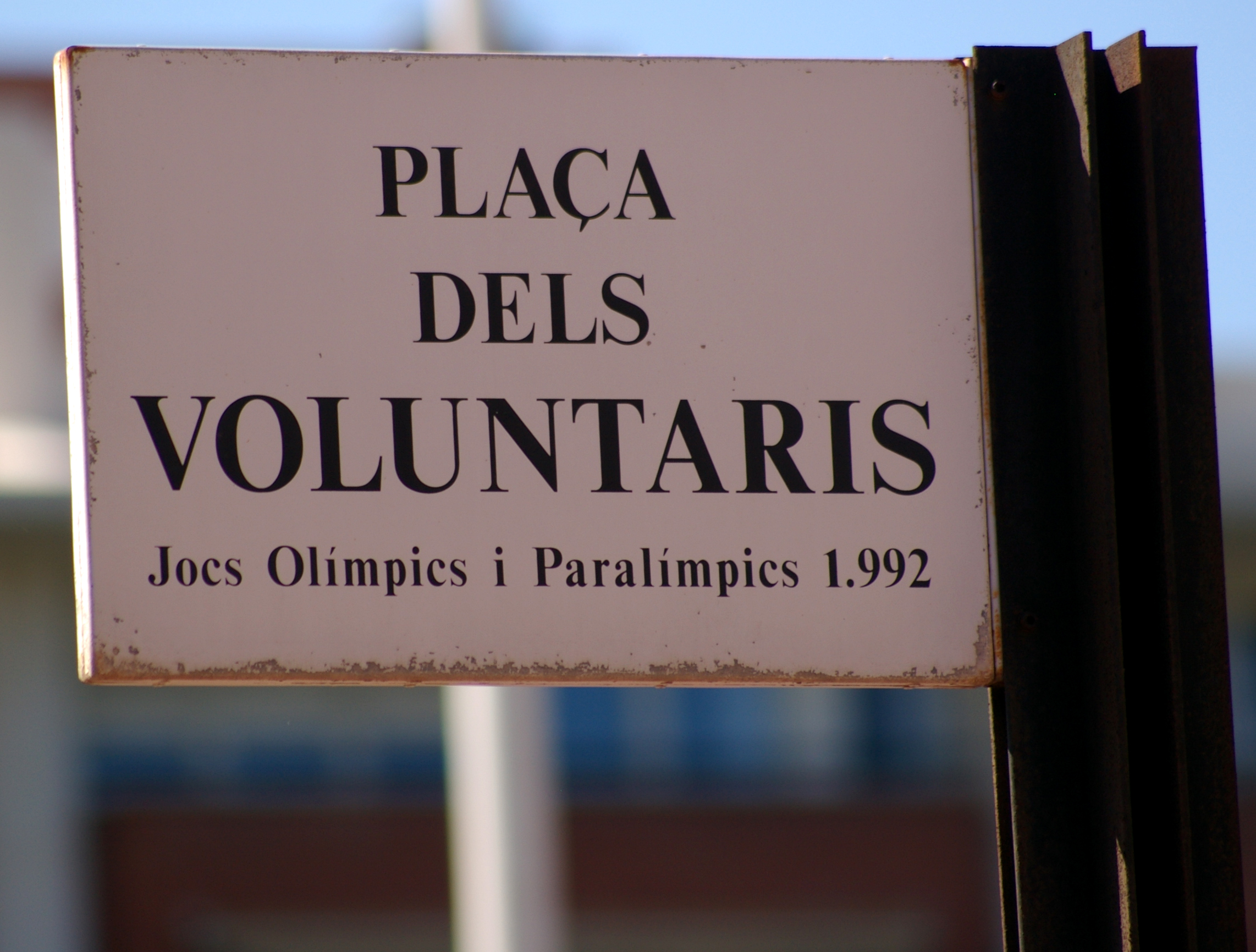
Plaça dels Voluntaris Olímpics.

Another of Barcelona's profound transformations came on the occasion of the 1992 Olympic Games. The event involved the remodeling of part of the mountain of Montjuïc, where the so-called Olympic Ring (1985–1992), a large enclosure that houses several sports facilities, such as the Olympic Stadium Lluís Companys and the Palau Sant Jordi, was located. This site is located on an avenue called Passeig de Minicius Natal, a military man and senator of Roman Barcino who was the first Barcelonian to win a medal at the Olympic Games; the promenade is located between the squares of Europa and Nemesi Ponsati, a promoter of sport in Barcelona, president of the Barcelona Swimming Club. In Montjuïc several roads were also named in memory of the games, such as the Olympic promenade, the street of the 92 Games and the street of Pierre de Coubertin, the founder of the modern Olympic Games.

For the accommodation of the athletes, a new neighborhood was built, the Olympic Village of Poblenou (1985–1992), with a general layout by the firm MBM Arquitectes. Several of the streets in the new neighborhood were named after cities that had previously hosted Olympic Games: Antwerp, Amsterdam, Atlanta, Stockholm, Helsinki, Los Angeles, Melbourne, Moscow, Munich, Saint Louis and Seoul. On the other hand, the most central square of the neighborhood, located between the skyscrapers Torre Mapfre and Hotel Arts, was dedicated to the Olympic Volunteers, while another nearby square was named after the Champions. Other streets in the neighborhood were named after artists and writers, such as Joan Miró, Arquitecto Sert, Joan Oliver and Salvador Espriu, as well as the square of Tirant lo Blanc, the novel by Joanot Martorell.

The Olympic Games also led to the creation of new parks and gardens, such as the parks of Mirador del Migdia, Poblenou, Carlos I and three designed by the firm MBM Arquitectes: the park of the Cascades, the Olympic Port and the park of Nova Icària.

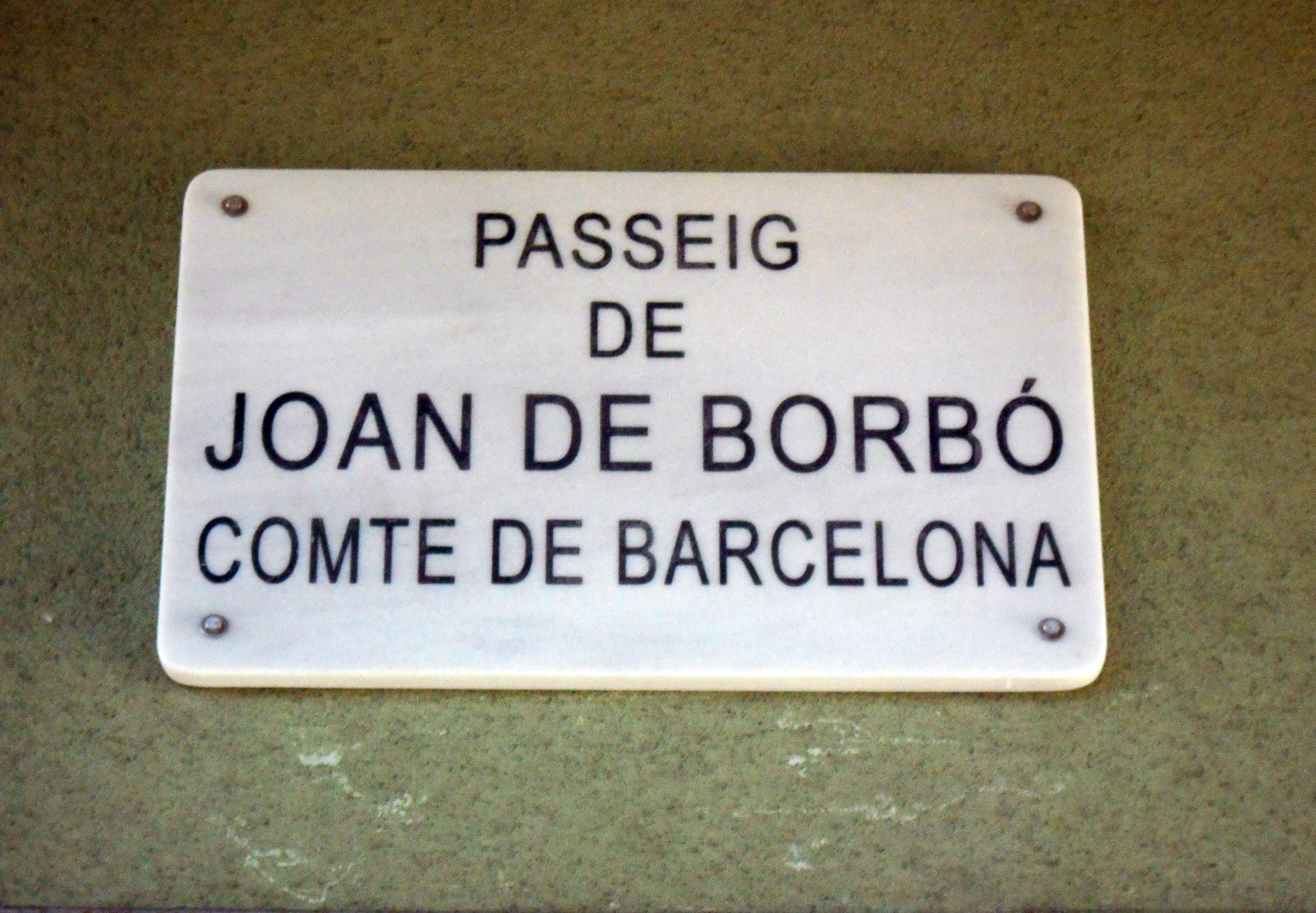
Passeig de Joan de Borbó Comte de Barcelona, formerly Paseo Nacional.

It should also be noted that on the occasion of the Games, the city's road structure was significantly expanded, especially with the creation of the ring roads (1989–1992), arranged as a ring road along the entire urban perimeter. Three ring roads were established: the Ronda de Dalt (upper ring road), the Ronda del Mig (middle ring road) and the Ronda del Litoral (shore ring road). The first two ring around Barcelona, while the Ronda del Mig runs through the city and has different names depending on the section: Passeig de la Zona Franca, Rambla de Badal, Rambla de Brasil, Gran Via de Carles III, Ronda del General Mitre, Travesera de Dalt, Ronda del Guinardó, Carrer de Ramon Albó, Carrer d'Arnau d'Oms, Carrer de Piferrer and Avinguda de Rio de Janeiro.

The city's beaches were also conditioned for the Games, thanks to a Coastal Plan whereby they were cleaned and filled with sand from the seabed, and underwater reefs were placed to favor the flora and fauna with a view to their regeneration. Along the seafront are the beaches of Sant Sebastiá, Sant Miquel, Barceloneta, Somorrostro, Nova Icària, Bogatell, Mar Bella, Nova Mar Bella and Banys Fórum. There are also the Gas, Bogatell, Bac de Roda and Mar Bella breakwaters, as well as the Poblenou breakwater.

In the following years there were several name changes and new roads were also baptized.

=== 21st Century ===
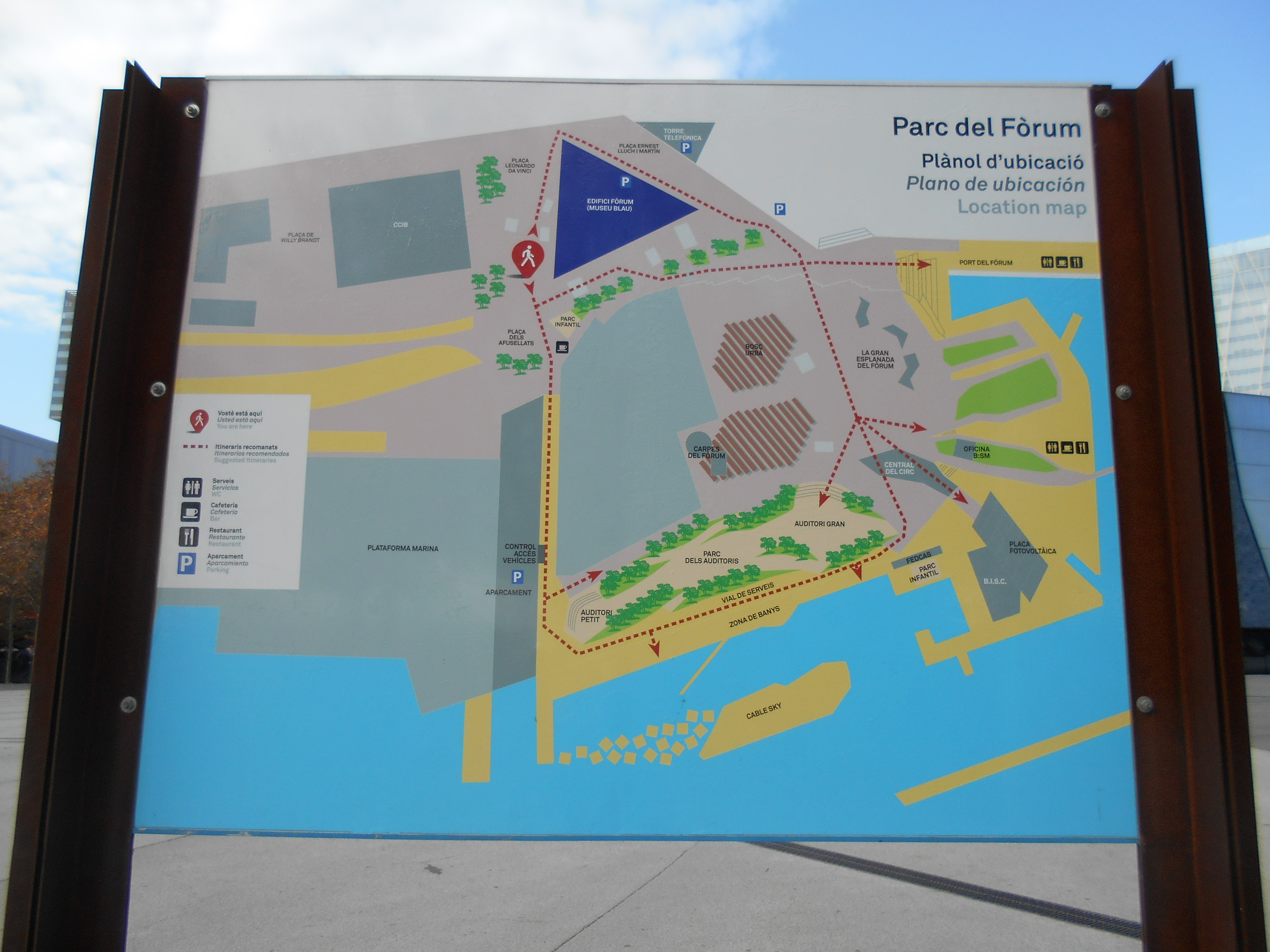
Sign with the map of the Parc del Fòrum

The turn of the century did not bring any substantial changes in the nomenclature, as the same criteria followed since the return of democracy continued. One of the first urban planning projects of the new millennium was the creation of the 22@ district, thanks to a modification of the General Metropolitan Plan (PGM. In Catalan: "Pla General Metropolità") in 2000. Its objective was to reformulate the industrial land in the El Poblenou neighborhood, a traditionally industrial sector that was to be reformulated by focusing on companies dedicated to new technologies. The name comes from the code that the PGM applies to urban industrial land, 22a, changing this "a" for the @ as a symbol of information and communication technologies.

In 2000, a plot of land in Sant Andreu was also developed after the relocation of La Maquinista Terrestre y Marítima factory. The new streets were given names related to the factory: parc de La Maquinista de Sant Andreu, carrer and jardins de La Maquinista de La Campana, and carrers de La Maquinista de les Naus, els Ponts and els Trens.

Between 2002 and 2003 several streets in the Zona Franca were named after concepts related to the struggle for peace and human rights: Amnistia Internacional, Drets Humans, Gernika (city bombed in 1937), Soweto (for the 1976 revolt against racial discrimination in South Africa), Jane Addams (pacifist and suffragette, Nobel Peace Prize in 1931) and Francesc Boix i Campo (photographer interned in Mauthausen).

In 2003 it was decided to dedicate to Salvador Dalí a square located in front of the Sagrera AVE Station, which has not yet materialized due to the 10 year delay in the construction works of the station with funds from the central Spanish Government.

One of the most outstanding events of the new millennium was the celebration of the Universal Forum of Cultures 2004, which allowed new urban changes in the city: the entire Besòs area, until then populated by old disused factories, was recovered, the entire Poblenou neighborhood was regenerated and the new Diagonal Mar neighborhood was built, while the city was provided with new parks and spaces for the leisure of the citizens. The main spaces named for the event were the squares of the Forum, Ernest Lluch, Willy Brandt, Leonardo Da Vinci, and Fusil·lats (for those executed by firing squads during Franco's dictatorship at Camp de la Bota, the site upon which the Forum was built).

In 2005, several streets in the Port of Barcelona's Flammables dock were named after international ports: Alexandria, Casablanca, Haifa, Lagos, Miami, Ningbo, and Tianjin. An extension was made in 2012 with more port names: Genoa, Rotterdam, Tarragona, and Shanghai.

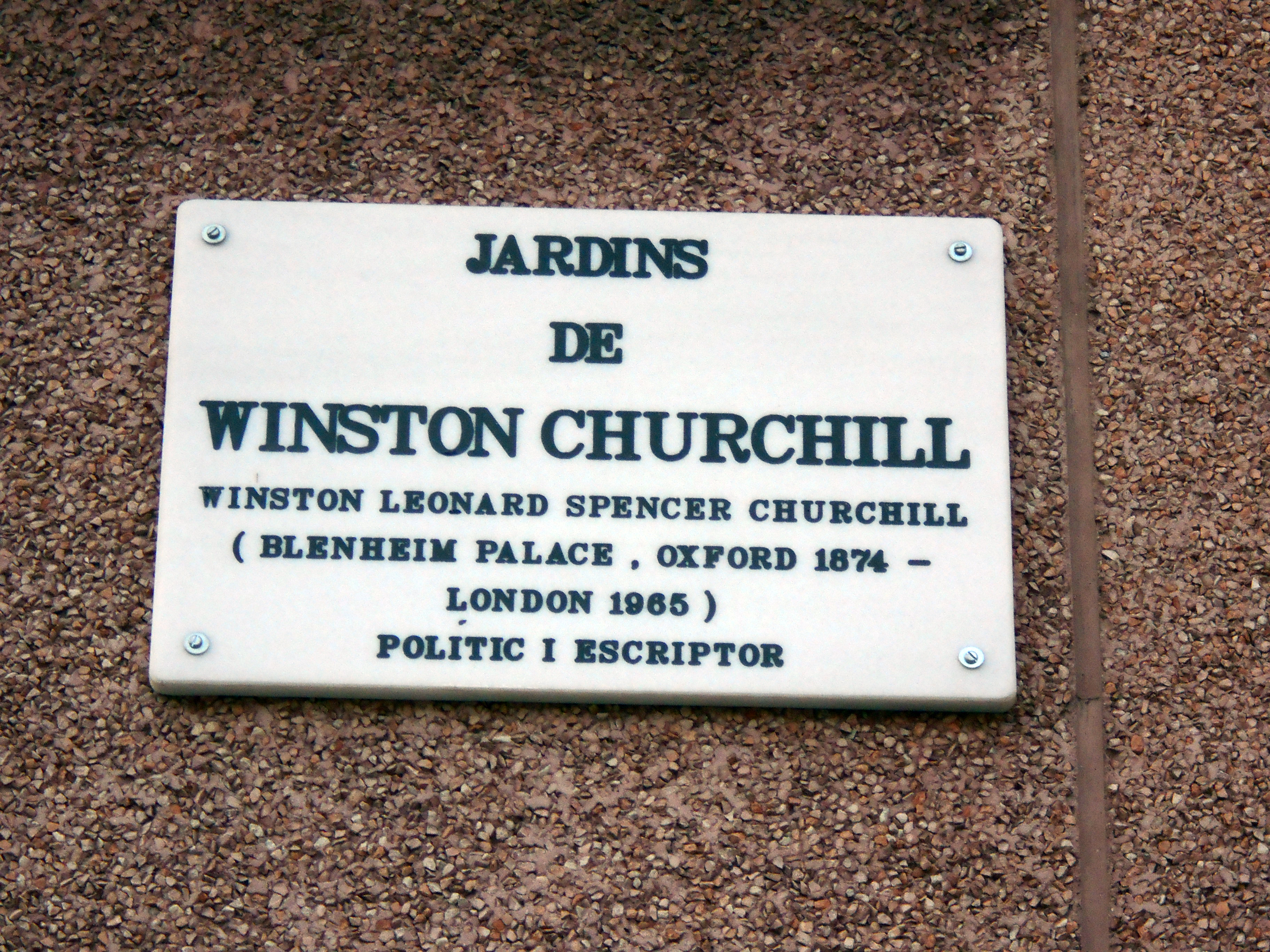
Jardins de Winston Churchill (2012).

Among the last changes of names made in recent years are: Carrer de Posoltega to Passeig de L'Havana (2000), Pasatge de Marçal to Avinguda del Carrilet — nickname of the Catalan Railways — (2001), Plaça de Gibraltar to Grau Miró — a monk from the 10th century — (2002), Sant Francesc de Paula to Palau de la Música (2005), Avinguda de l'Hospital Militar to Avinguda Vallcarca (2006), Estévanez to Garcilaso (2007), Pont del Treball to Pont del Treball Digne (2008), Passeig de las Cascades to Jean C. N. Forestier (2009), Avinguda del Marquès de Comillas to Avinguda Francesc Ferrer i Guàrdia (2010), Plaça del Marquès de Foronda to Plaça Josep Puig i Cadafalch (2012), Sagrera to Carrer Gran de la Sagrera (2013), Teniente Coronel Valenzuela to Carrer John M. Keynes (2014), Carrer de l'Almirall Cervera to Carrer Pepe Rubianes (2017) and Carrer de Ramiro de Maeztu to Carrer d'Ana María Matute (2021).

As far as new odonyms are concerned, several have been introduced in recent years, among which we can mention: Rambla del Raval (2000), Plaça Verda de la Prosperitat (2001), Plaça del Fort Pienc (2002), Plaça de Luis Buñuel (2005), Plaça de Charles Darwin (2006), Jardins de Teresa de Calcutta (2007), Carrer d'Isaac Newton (2008), Jardins de William Shakespeare (2009), Jardins dels Setze Jutges (2011), Jardins de Winston Churchill (2012), Plaça del Moviment Obrer (2018), and Carrer de Gabriel García Márquez (2021).

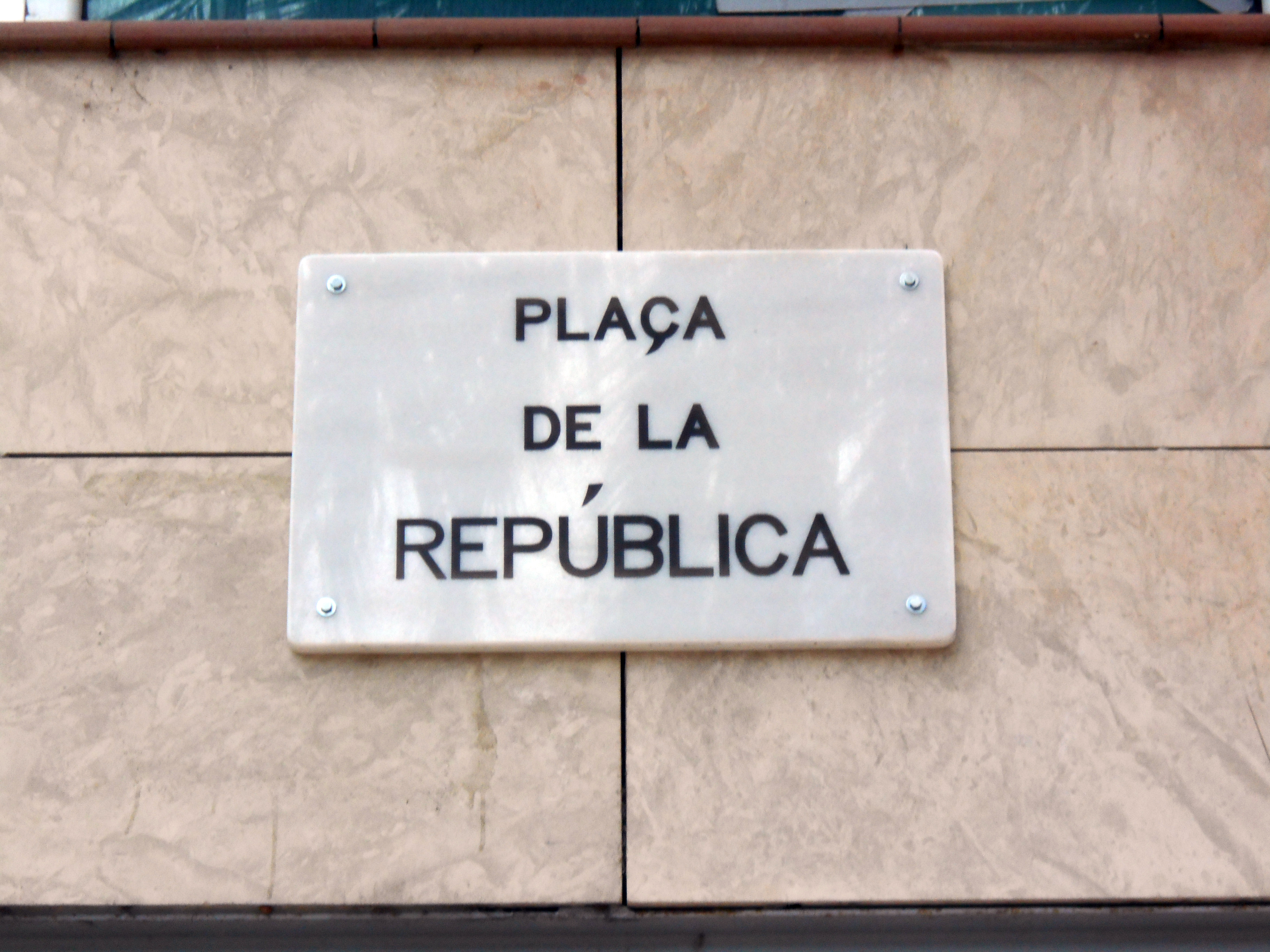
Plaza de la República (2016)

On April 14, 2016 the plaça de Llucmajor, where Monument a la República is located, was renamed the plaça de la República. This was a long-standing demand of neighborhood associations in the area, which was met by the new Barcelona en Comú party-led City Hall which emerged in 2015. The announcement was made on November 29, 2015, setting the date for April 14, "Republic Day" (for the proclamation of the Second Spanish Republic on April 14, 1931). Conversely, some gardens located in the square that were dedicated to the Second Republic were renamed Llucmajor, so the name of this Mallorcan town in the index of Barcelona street names was maintained. For this reason, the Llucmajor subway station located in the square did not change names.

Additionally, under mayor Ada Colau, City Hall considered changing the names of several streets related to the Bourbon dynasty under the premise that it was restored as a result of Franco's dictatorship. The affected roads would be: Passeig Joan de Borbó, Comte de Barcelona, María Cristina square and avenue, Passatge d'Isabel, Bourbon Avenue, Avenue of Isabel II, Square of Joan Carles I, Alfons XII Street, Avenue Prince of Asturias, Carrer Reina Cristina, Carrer Reina Victòria and the Príncep d'Espanya Pier. The first official change was made on September 23, 2016, when the change of plaça de Joan Carles I to Cinc d'Oros, its previous popular name, was approved. In September 2018, after a public consultation process, the gardens of the Prince of Girona — one of the titles of the heir to the Crown — were renamed Jardins del Baix Guinardó. That same year, proceedings were initiated to change three other names linked to the Spanish monarchy: Infantas gardens to Magalí gardens, Prince of Asturias avenue to Riera de Cassoles, its previous popular name — approved in February 2019 — and Bourbon avenue to Els Quinze.

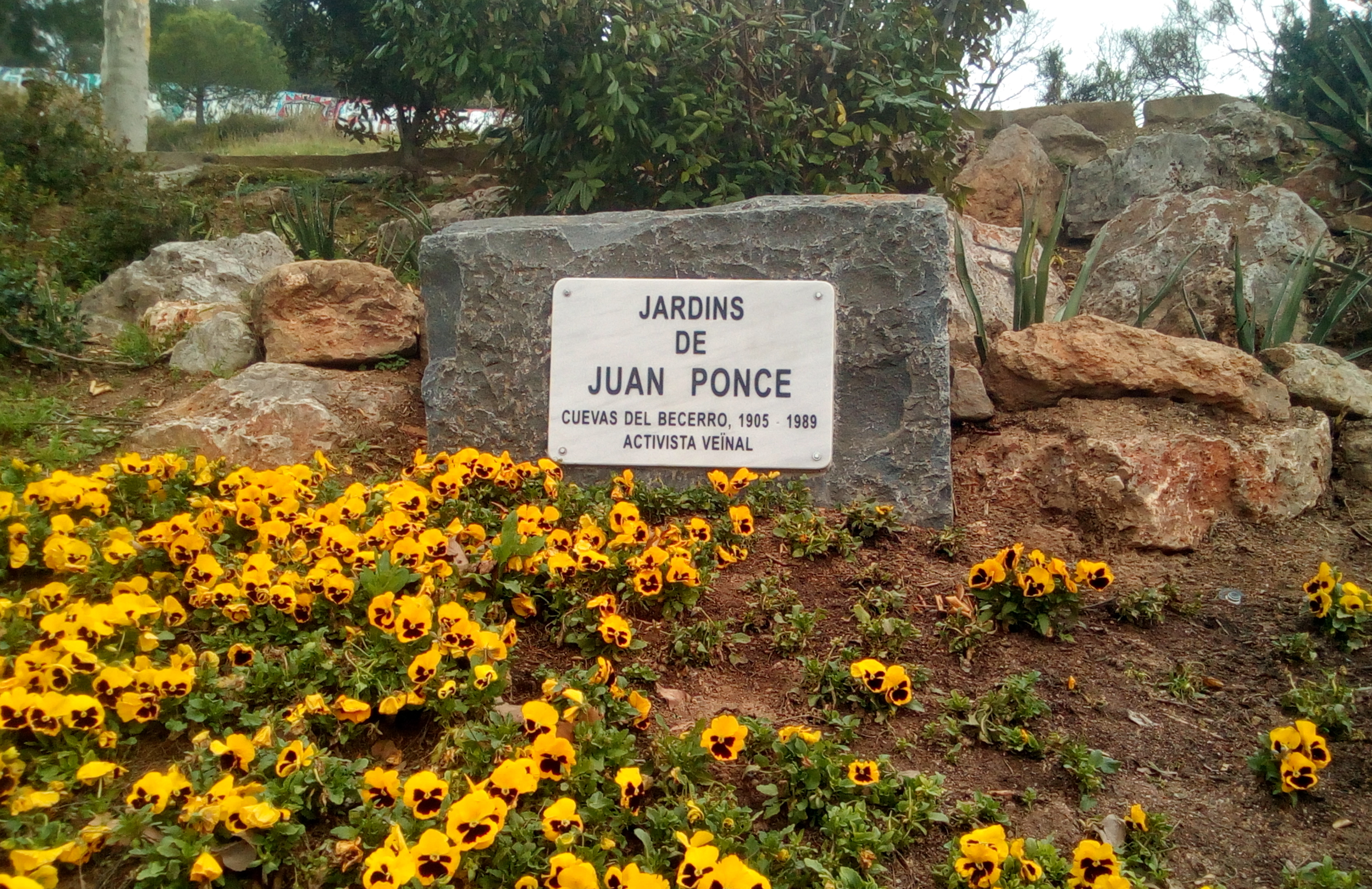
Jardins de Juan Ponce

In addition, the suitability of the names of other public roads was also questioned, such as Aviador Franco Street, after the Dictator's brother, who had taken part in the bombing of Barcelona; that of Secretari Coloma, promoter of the Inquisition in the fifteenth century; or the plaça de Antonio Lopez, due to his activity as a slave trader. Thus, in 2018 it was agreed to change the street of Aviator Franco to Pablo Rada, engineer on the same Plus Ultra flight piloted by Franco. In 2019 it was decided to change the street name Secretari Coloma to Pau Alsina, its previous name, a labor leader. As for Antonio López square, in 2021 it was divided into two on either side of Via Laietana: the part in front of the Post Office building was renamed Plaça de Correus; the part in front of the Llotja de Barcelona was named after Idrissa Diallo, a Guinean immigrant who died in the Zona Franca Internment Center for Aliens in 2012.

On March 7, 2017, the unification of Hispanitat and Pablo Neruda squares was announced, creating a single square dedicated to the Chilean poet. On the other hand, on July 16, 2018, the street name of Sant Domènec del Call, which referred to the pogrom of August 5, 1391 (Saint Dominic's Day), was changed to Salomó Ben Adret (1235–1310), a medieval rabbi who was a lender to King James I and the Chief of the Talmudic School of Barcelona. In 2018 the Mar Bella Breakwater was also dedicated to the pediatrician and politician Antoni Gutiérrez, who was secretary general of the PSUC and who used to fish on this breakwater before his death in 2006. A plaque with the poem Laberint by Joan Brossa was also installed.

== Regulation ==
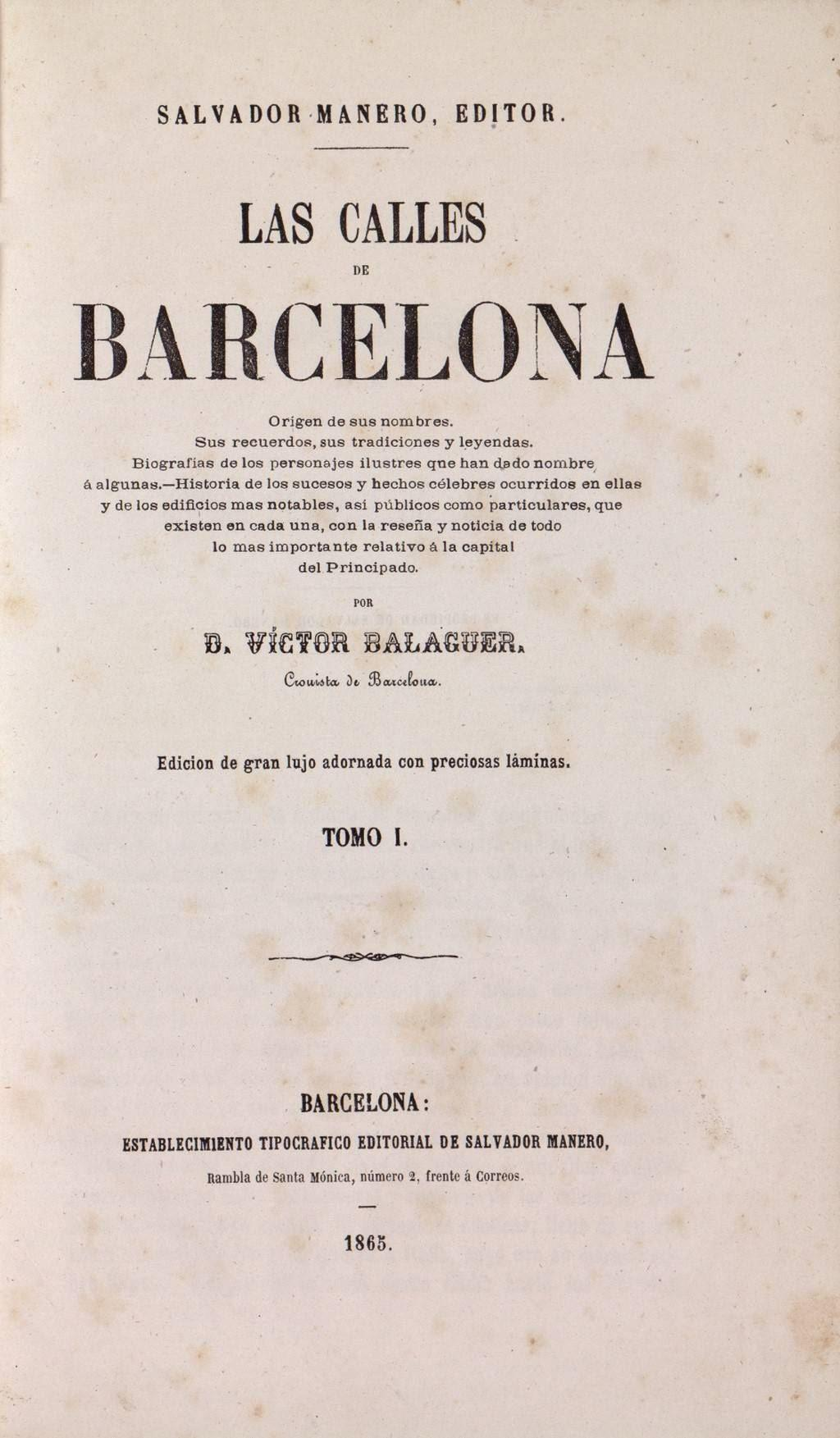
Las calles de Barcelona, by Víctor Balaguer (1865)

The first classification of the streets of Barcelona was made in 1917 by order of the Development Commission of the Barcelona City Council: La redacción de breves leyendas explicativas del significado de los nombres de las calles de la Ciudad ("the writing of brief explanatory legends of the meaning of the names of the streets of the City"), written by Ramon Nonat Comas i Pitxot and Josep Roca i Roca, and finalized in 1922.

In 1930 the report of the Ponencia de Rotulación de Calles, directed by Agustí Duran i Sanpere, was elaborated, in which a new classification of the streets was made, duplicities were pointed out and the ignorance of the meaning of numerous streets of ancient origin was noted.

The next attempt at classification was made with the arrival of democracy, at which time the Spanish meanings were also adapted to their normative version in Catalan. In 1981 the Nomenclàtor 1980 de les Vies Públiques de Barcelona was published by Miquel Ponsetí i Vives, which due to the short time spent in its preparation suffered from certain errors and gaps. A revised version was published in 1987, under the supervision of Pilar Aranda.

Finally, in 1996 a new version of the Gazetteer was made, in which the cards that Miquel Ponsetí had elaborated over the years were added, in which he carried out a deep investigation of meanings until then unknown, especially in terms of characters of former landowners who had baptized the spaces urbanized by them with their own names.

At present, the classification and naming of public streets is regulated by the Barcelona Street Nomenclature Committee, which studies proposals for new names through a commission chaired by the City Councilor for Culture, with the participation of various City Hall departments: Public Roads, Cartography, Urban Planning, Population, Institutional Relations and Sports, Heritage and the Municipal Program for Women. Experts in various fields are also consulted, and requests and suggestions from civic and neighborhood associations are attended to. From this, proposals are made that are ultimately approved by the mayor.

Among the various rules that apply to the naming of a public street, it is worth mentioning the one that concerns individuals: in Barcelona a street can only be named after a deceased person five years after their death; exceptions can only be made in the case of people awarded the Gold Medal of the City, and only the head of state can be named after a living person.

Other rules to be taken into account are: the use of acronyms and abbreviations on public roads is prohibited; changes of name will only be made in cases of force majeure, so as not to affect the neighborhood; duplicities will be avoided, except in existing streets within the perimeter of the Poble Espanyol; if a duplicity occurs, it will have different typological assignment (for example, street and square); proper names will be written with their original spelling, except in the case of saints, popes, kings or royal personages; streets will not be named after personages solely for the cession of the land; for the dedication of personages, the approval of the family will be sought; the labels of personages will contain their biographical data on at least one of the plaques to be placed.

== Labeling ==
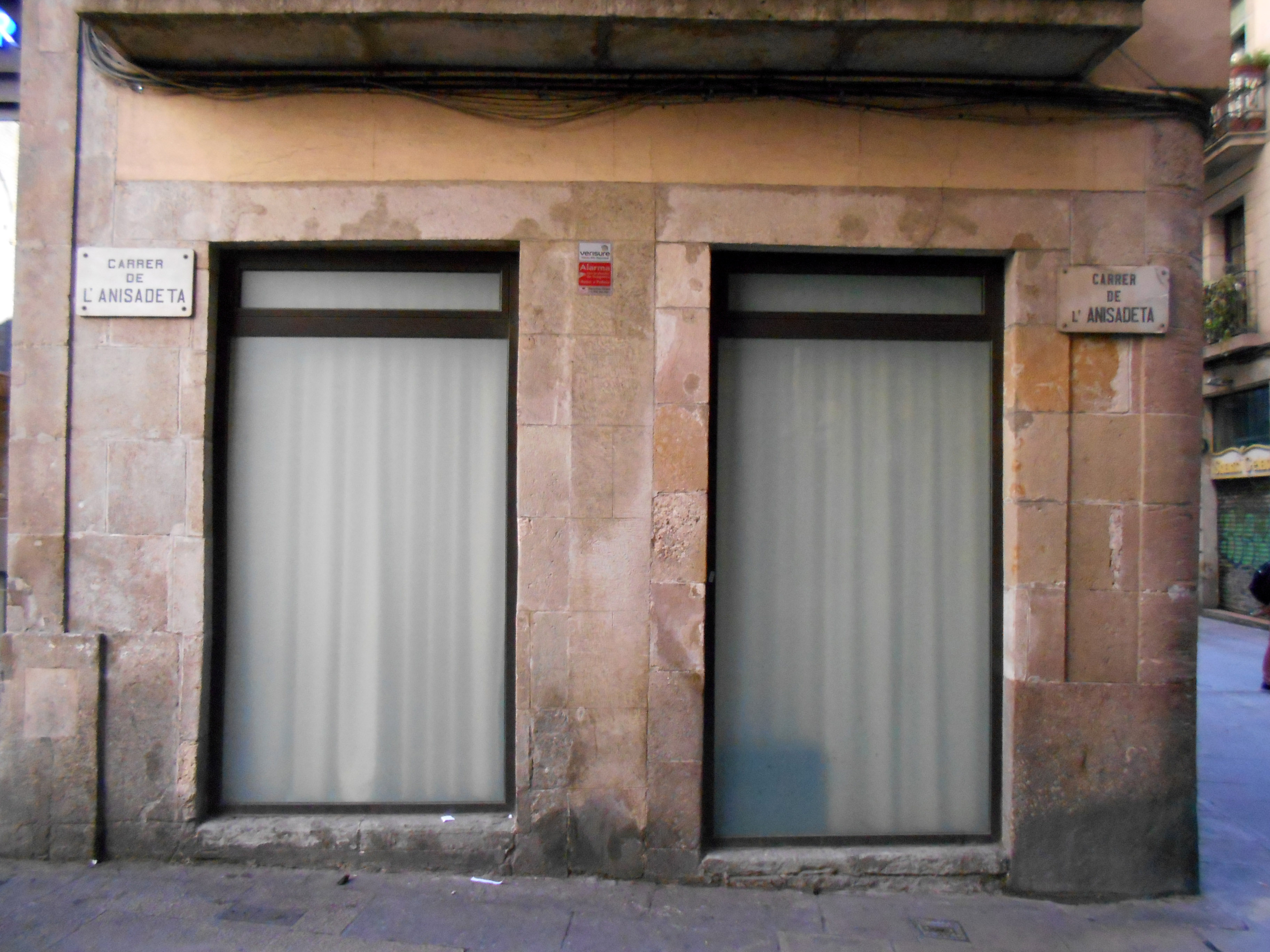
The carrer de la Anisadeta is the shortest street in Barcelona

The names of the streets of Barcelona are marked by signs generally located on the facades of buildings, generally on street corners and intersections, at a height of 3 to 5 meters. They specify the name of each street, consisting of a generic name (street, square, promenade, avenue, boulevard, etc.) and a proper name. Some signs also offer information about the odonym, especially in the case of personalities, where their biographical data and their profession or quality for which they acquired relevance are usually indicated. The signs are usually designed with criteria based on their visibility: the letters must be of an adequate size to be seen from a distance, and the color of the letters and the background must provide a good contrast. In Barcelona there are 34,350 street signs (2009 data).

Most signs are made of marble slabs, with the letters in bas-relief, composed of aluminous cement mixed with sand and black ink, and are fixed to the wall with stainless steel screws and nylon plugs. There are also road signs, which are usually placed on traffic lights or lighting columns, made of steel plate in white and blue colors, which in addition to the name of the road usually indicate the direction with an arrow and the street numbers; and vertical signs, with a white phenolic resin plate, placed on a mast.

The labeling of the streets began in 1842 because of the bombardment of the city by General Espartero and the following fine imposed on the people of Barcelona, which forced to have well located the citizenship. It was made with marble plaques and cast lead letters, similar to those of today. Although nowadays the plaques are rectangular, originally they were of sinuous contour, in the style of the frames of paintings and photographs. They were generally made of marble, although sometimes they were also made of ceramic. They were placed in Ciutat Vella, where some still remain, and in the Eixample at the beginning of its urbanization, although in this district they have already been removed.

In 1916, tiles with letters also appeared, which allowed the names of the streets to be written on the pavement of the sidewalks. They ceased to be installed in the 1960s, since when they have gradually disappeared, although there are still some examples, such as in Londres and París streets.

Between the 1940s and 1960s, street signs were made with tin plates, which were cheaper than marble ones. They had a bluish background, and the letters were silver. Later they were again made of marble.

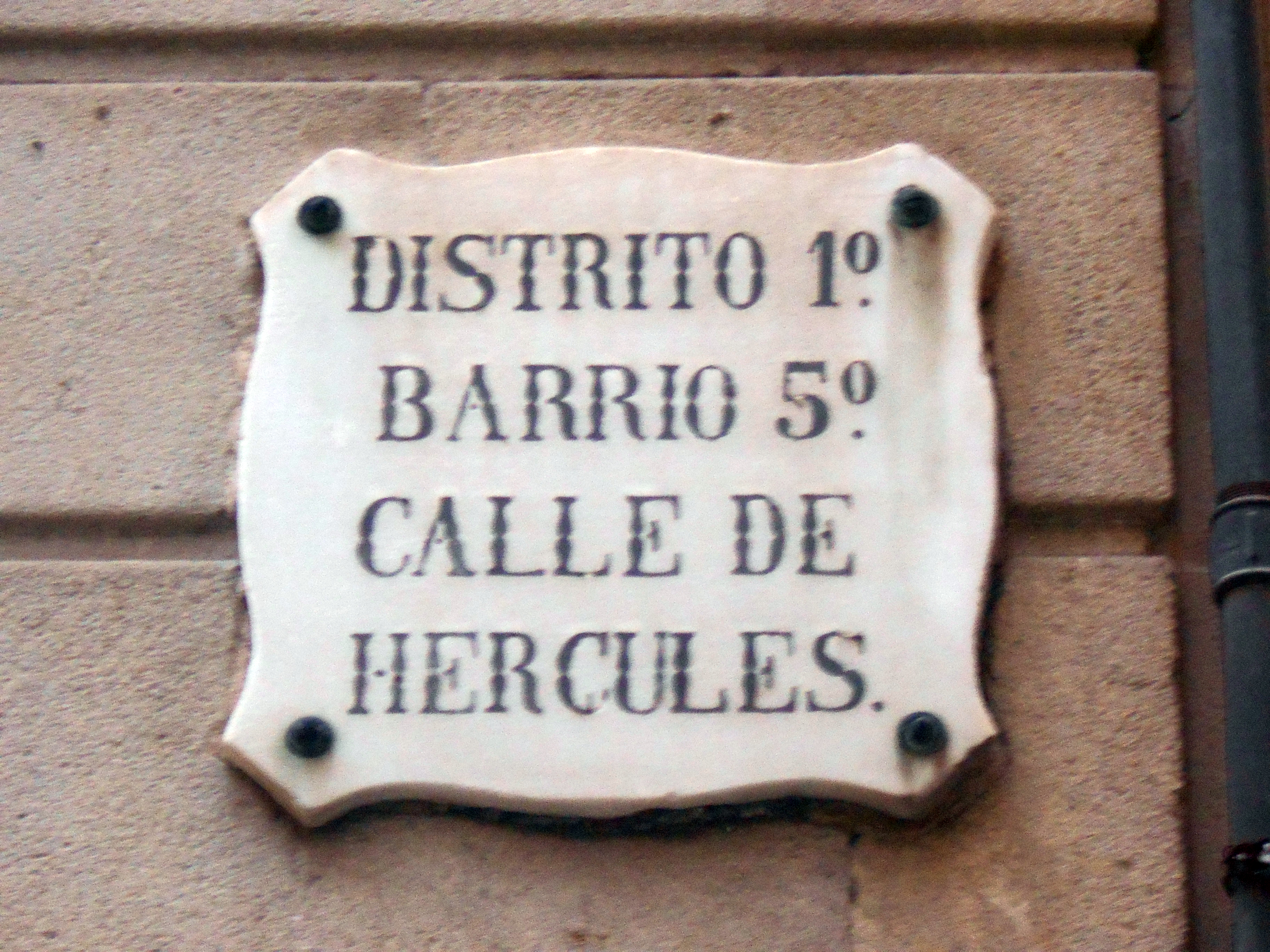
Old frame type sign: Calle de Hércules.

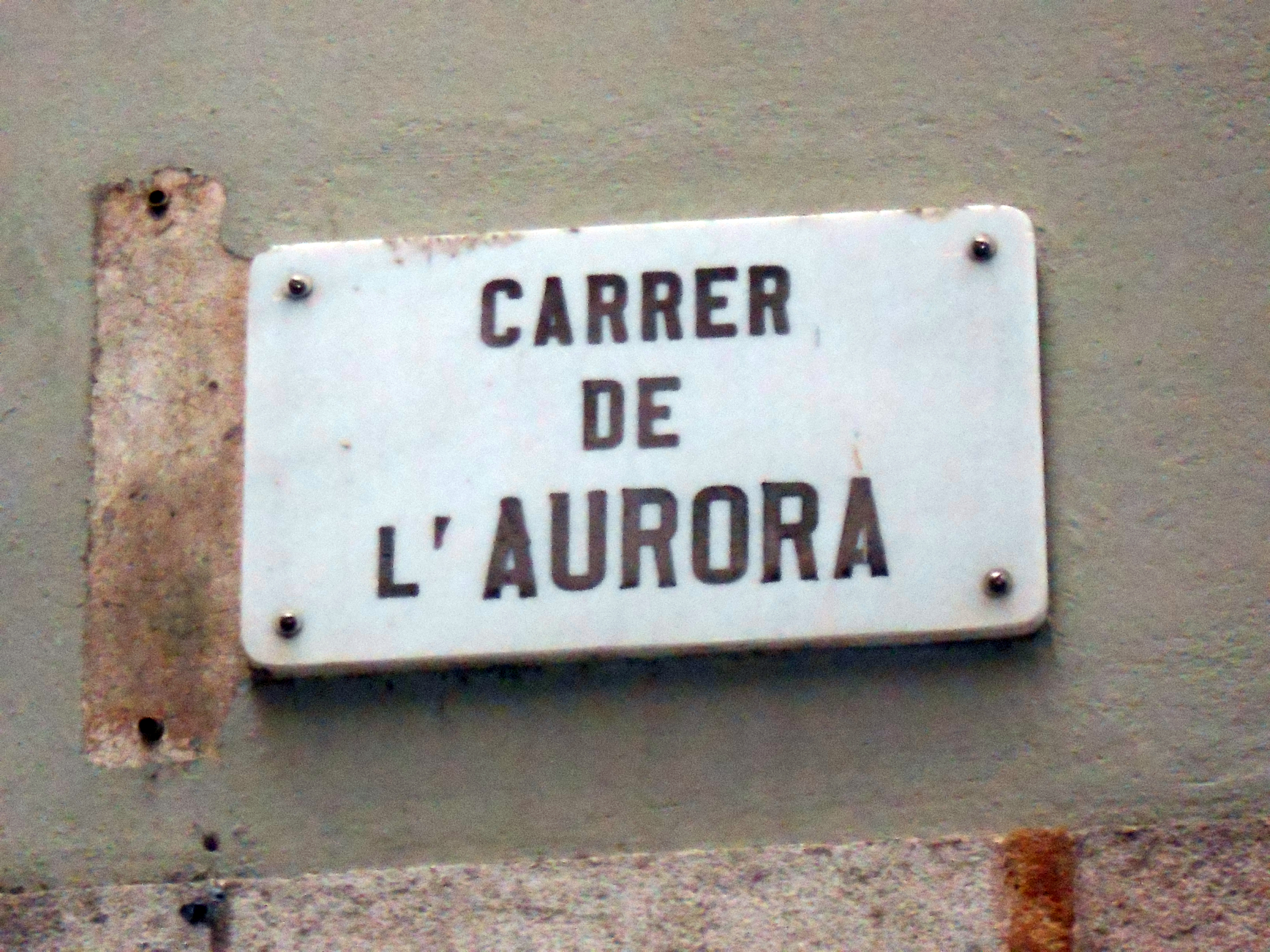
Normal plate: Carrer de l'Aurora.

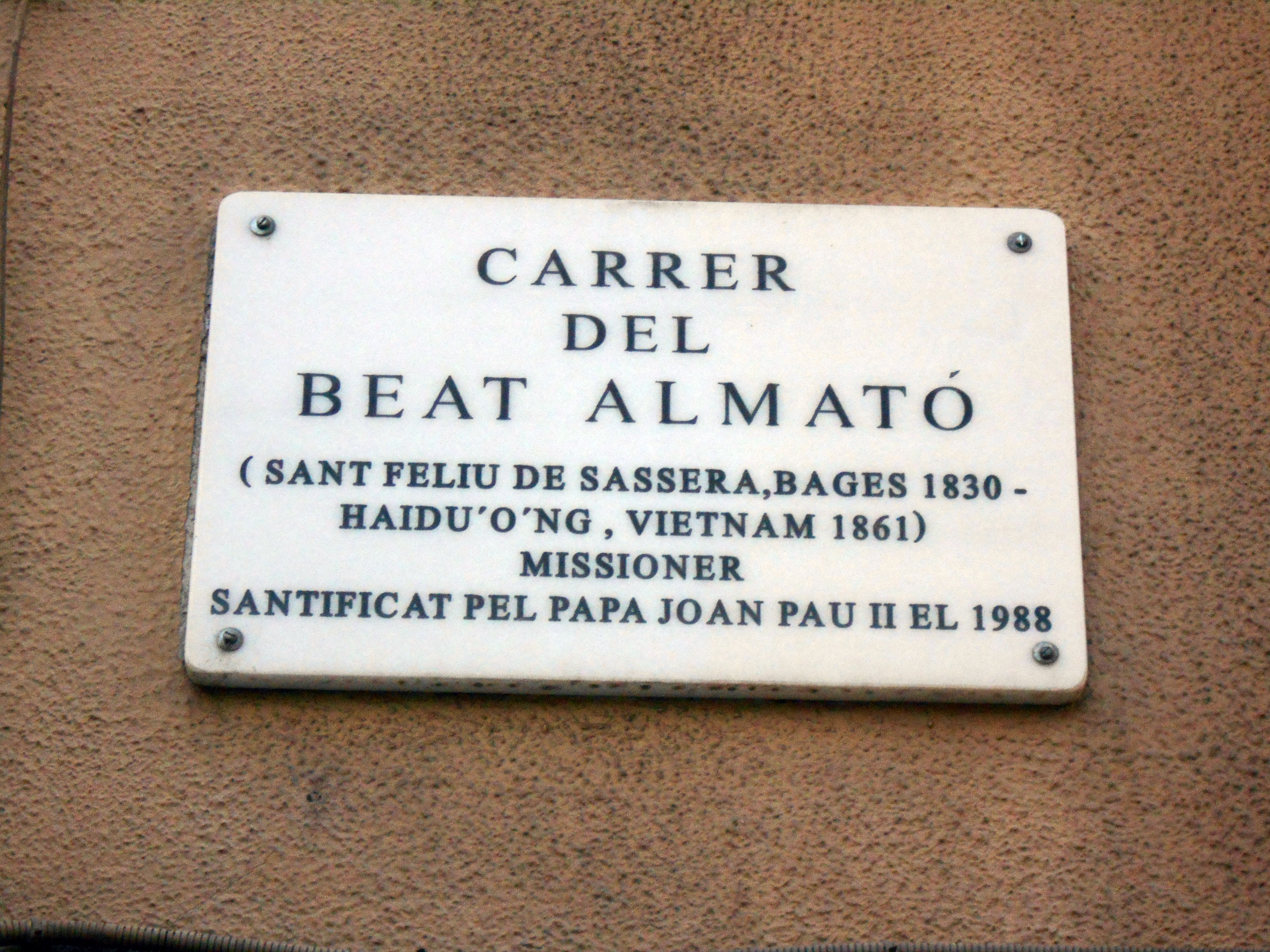
Plaque with biographical data: Carrer del Beat Almató.

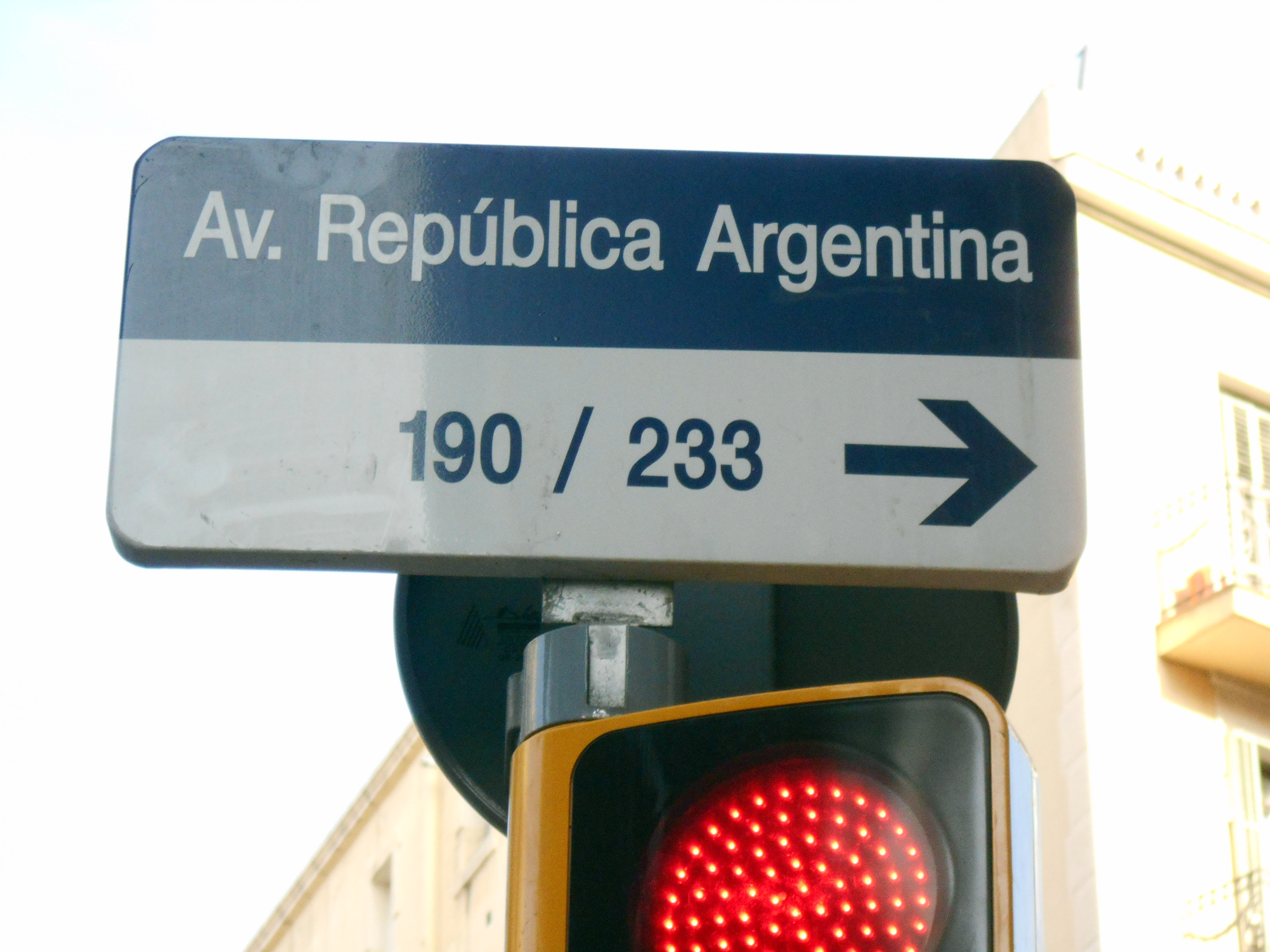
Road plate: Avinguda de la República Argentina.

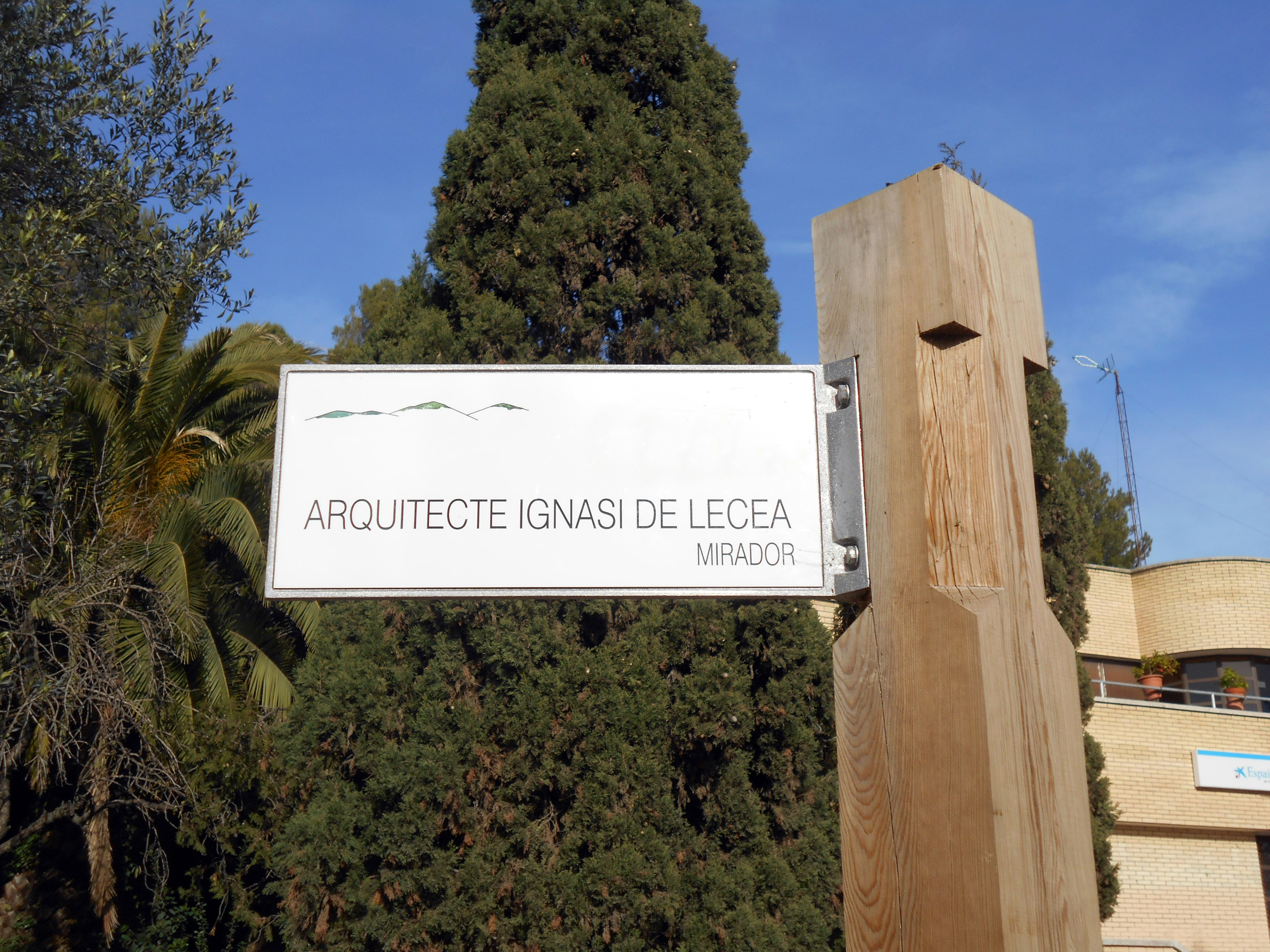
Vertical plaque on mast: Mirador Arquitecte Ignasi de Lecea.

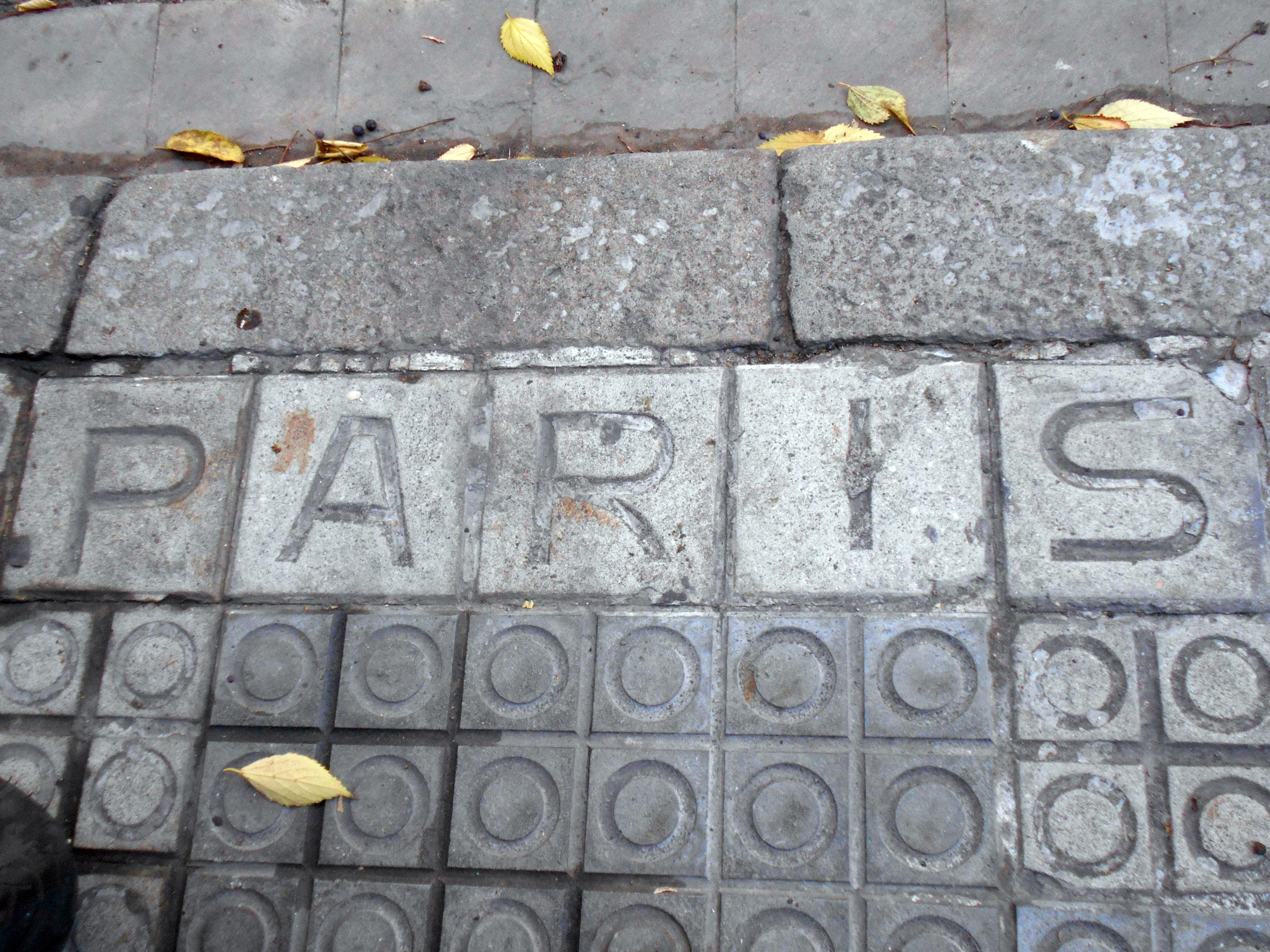
Street name on pavement: Carrer de París.

As for the numbering of buildings, as a general rule, the even numbers are placed on one side of the street and the odd numbers on the other, with the exception of squares, which, due to their morphology, are usually consecutive. Thus, for example, in the Eixample, the streets in the sea-mountain direction start the numbering on the sea side, with the even numbers on the right; and those in the Llobregat-Besòs direction start on the Llobregat side, with the even numbers on the right. The highest numbering in Barcelona is on Gran Via de les Corts Catalanes, which reaches number 1198, not in vain is the longest street in Spain, with 13 km long. On the other hand, the shortest is Anisadeta Street, which is 2 meters long.

== Gallery ==
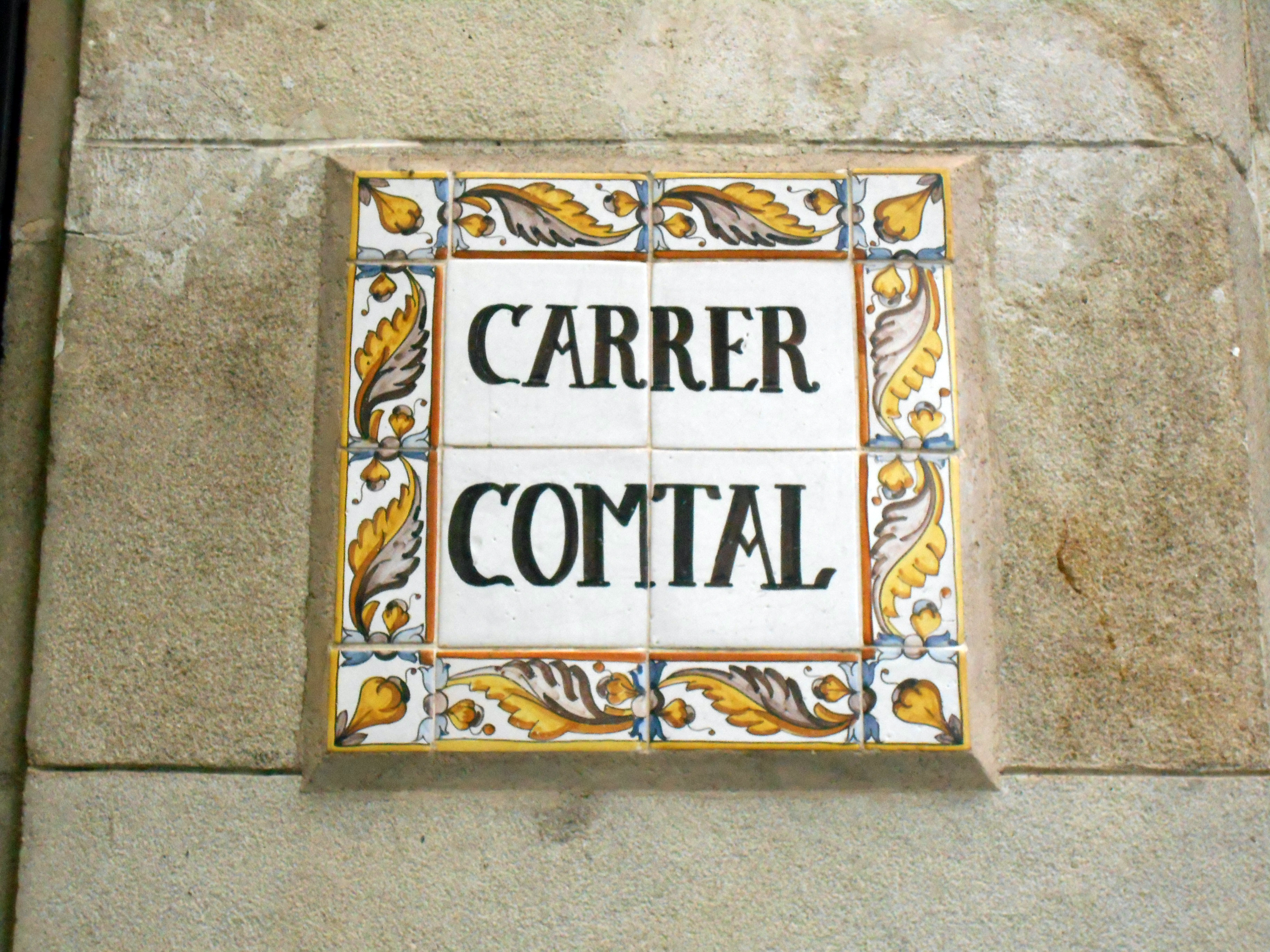
Carrer Comtal.

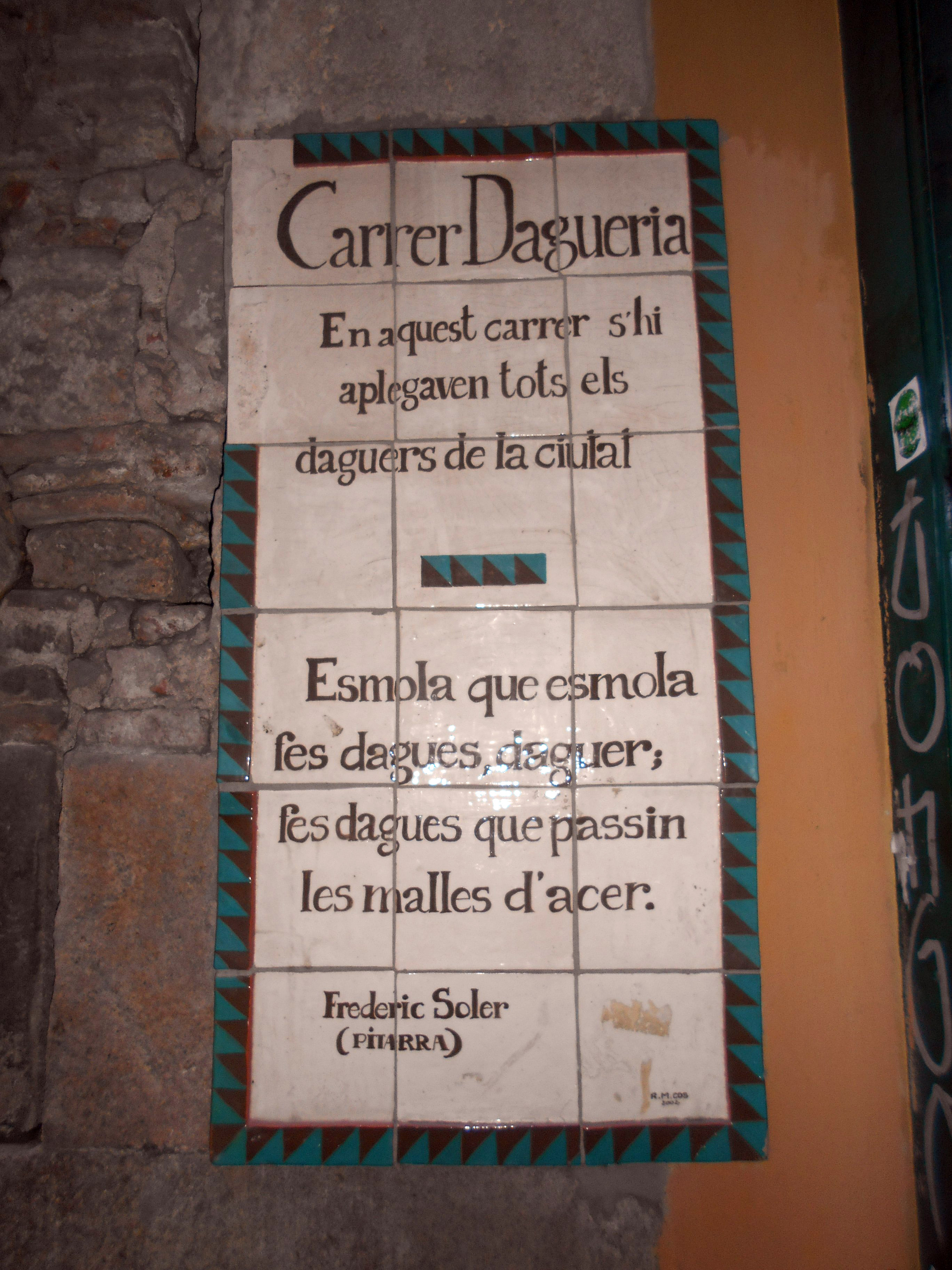
Carrer Dagueria.

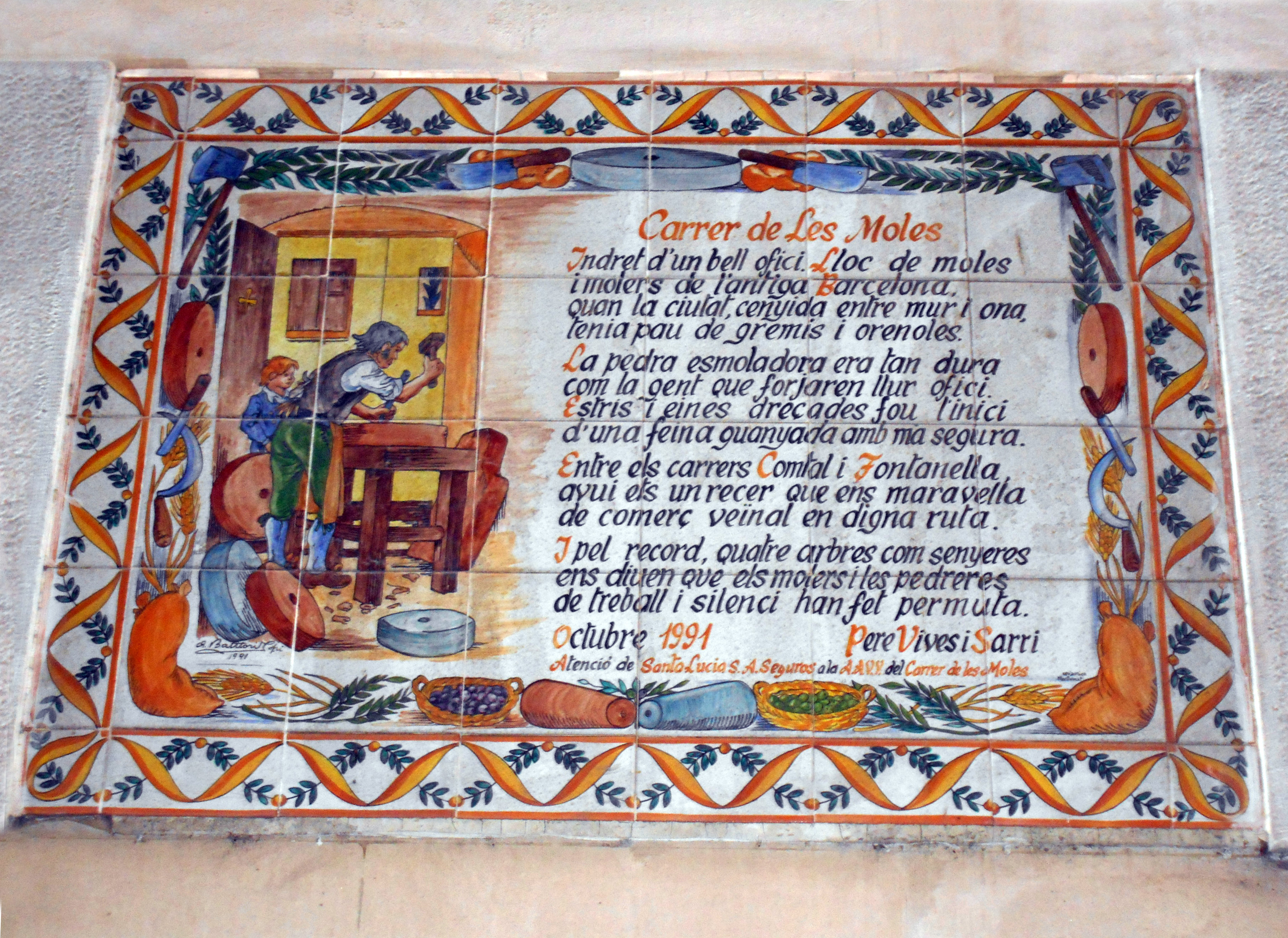
Carrer de les Moles.

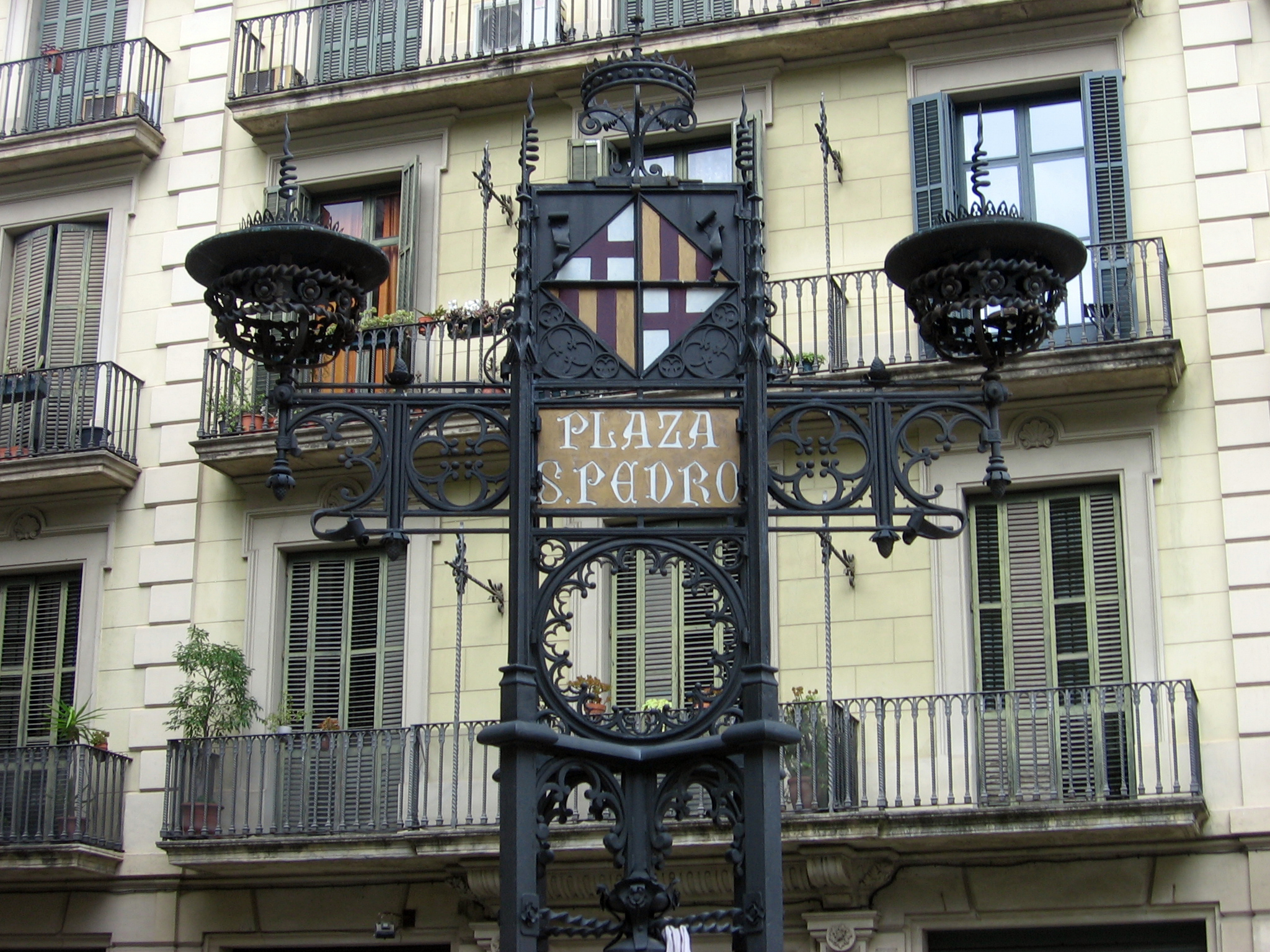
Plaza de San Pedro.

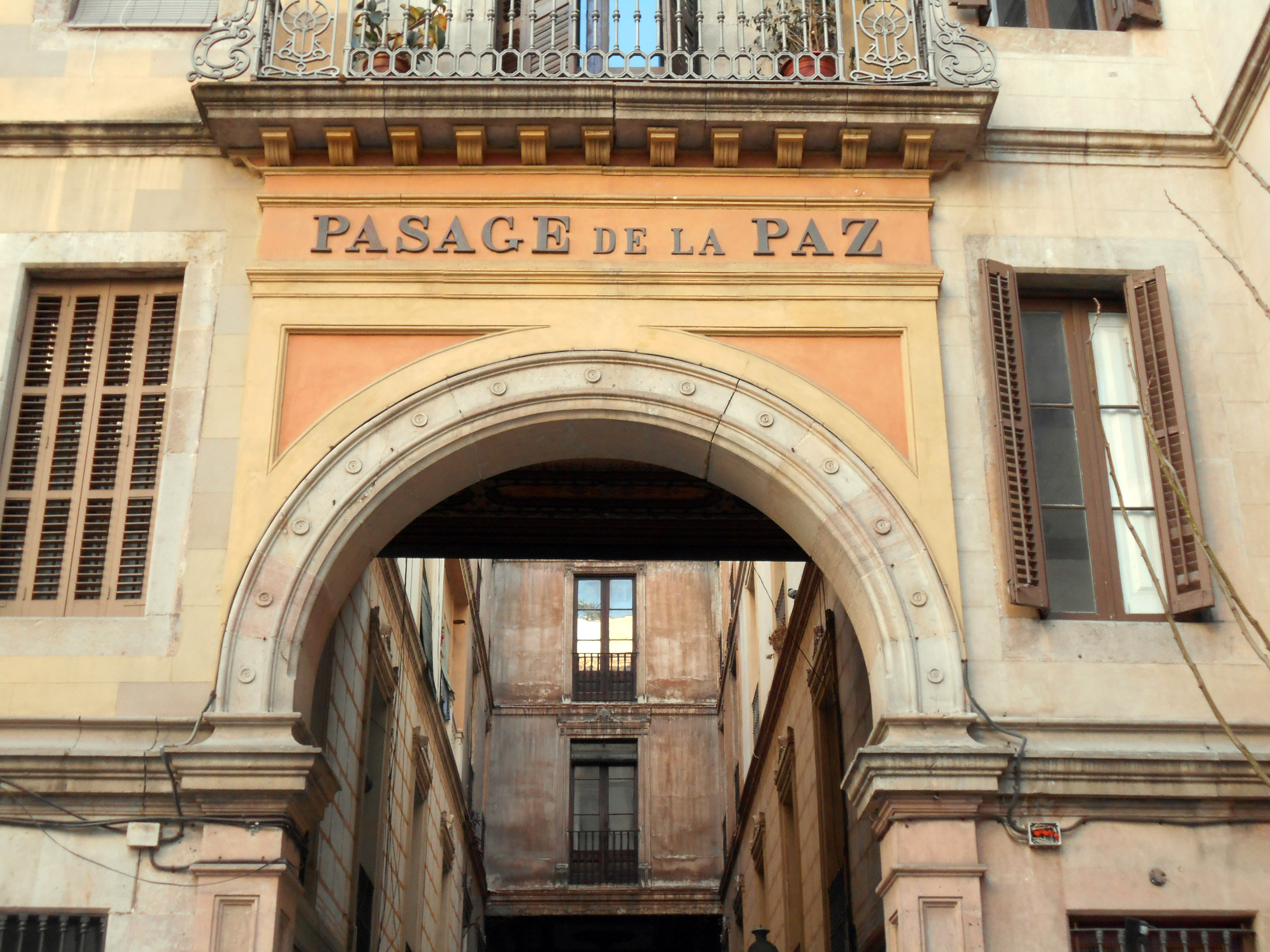
Pasaje de la Paz.

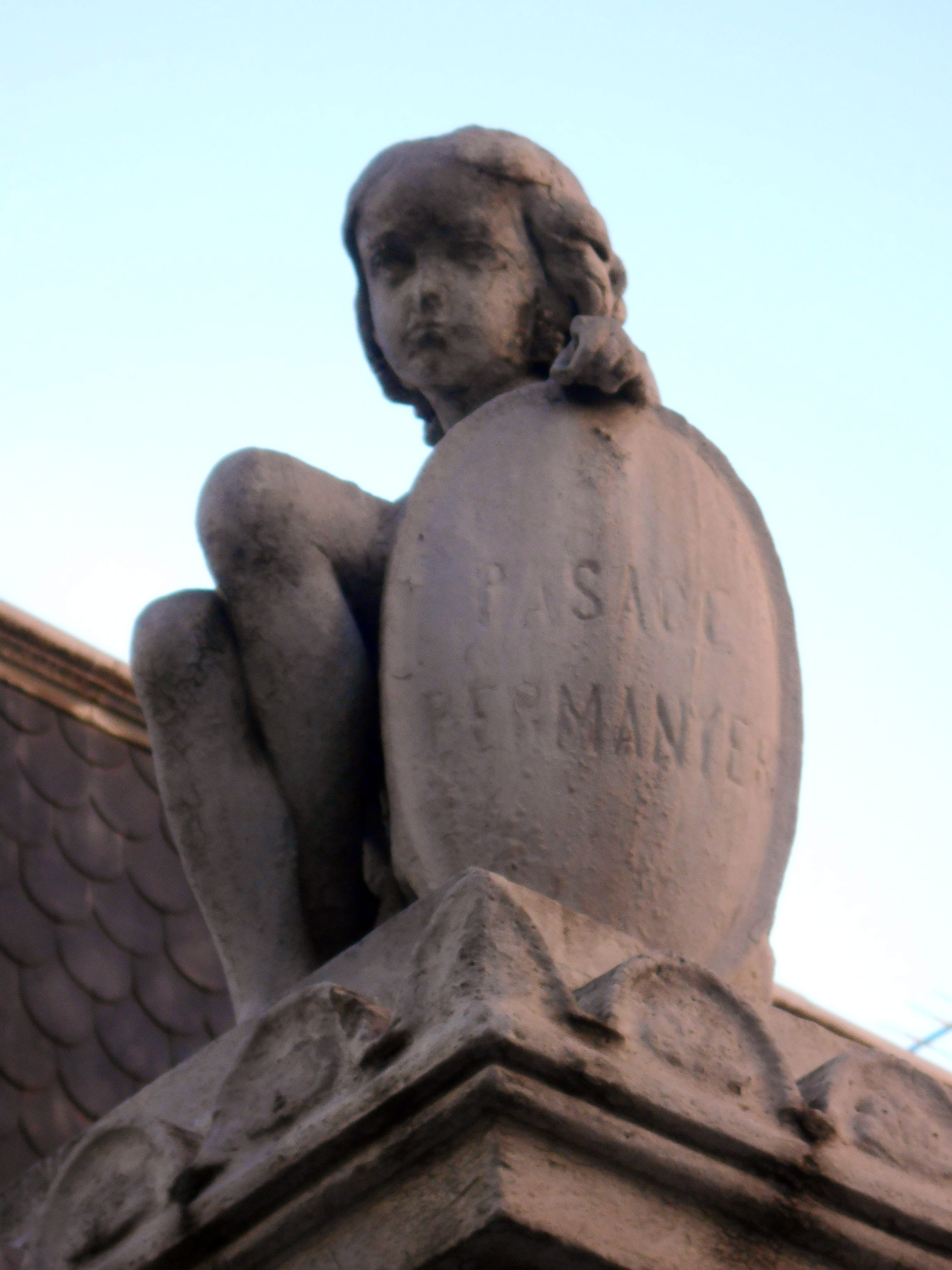
Pasaje de Permanyer.

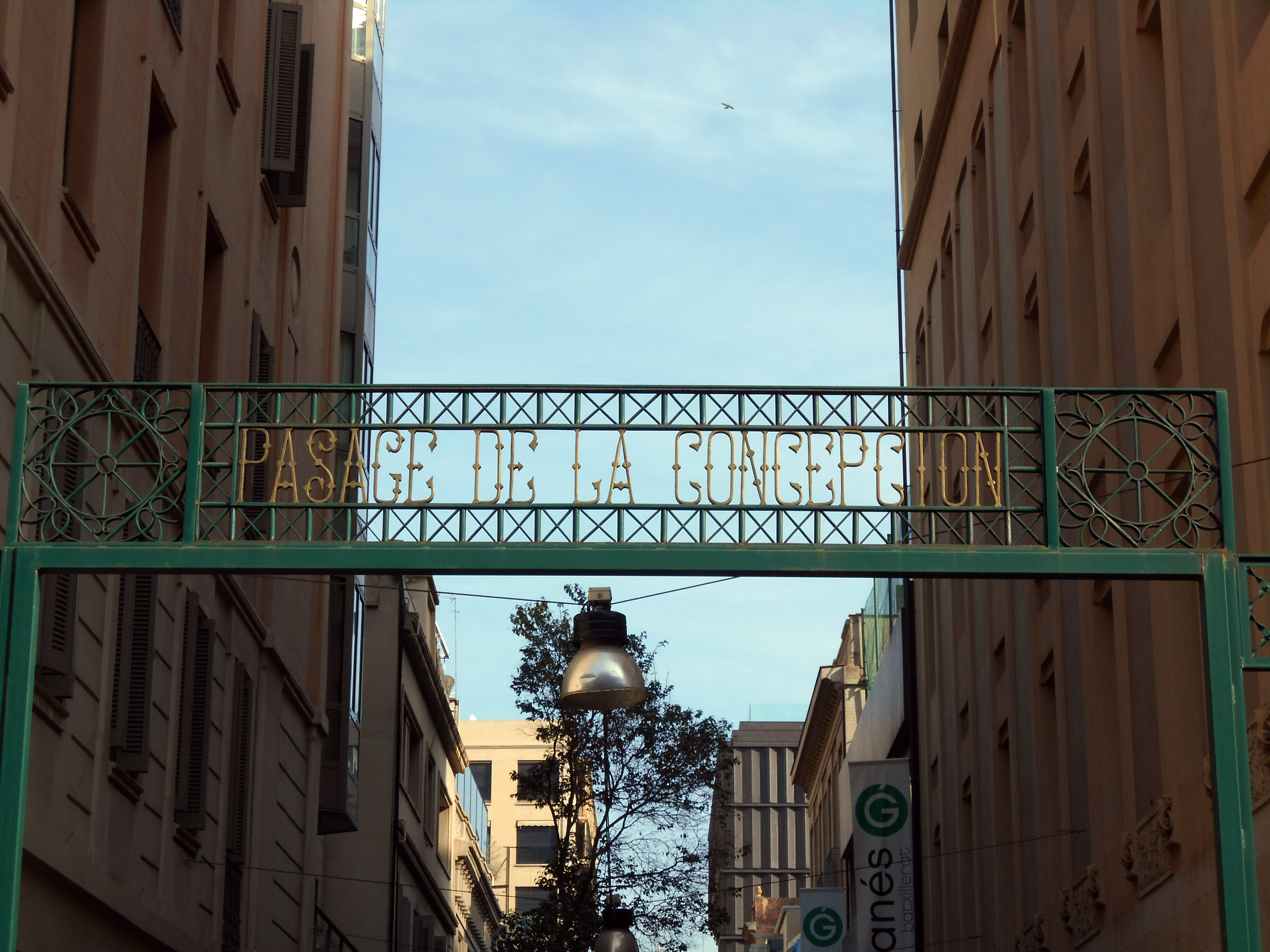
Pasaje de la Concepción.

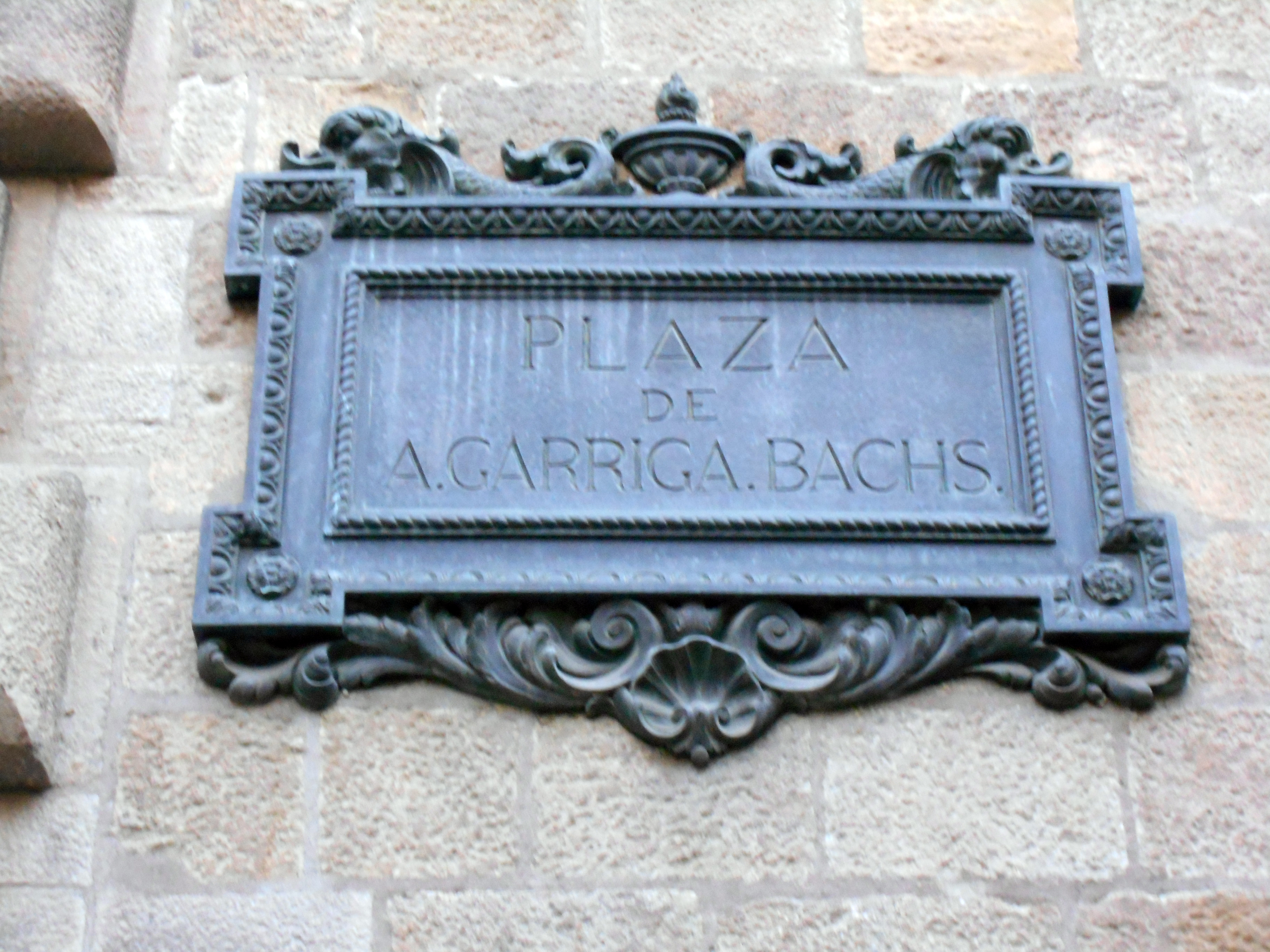
Plaza de Garriga i Bachs.

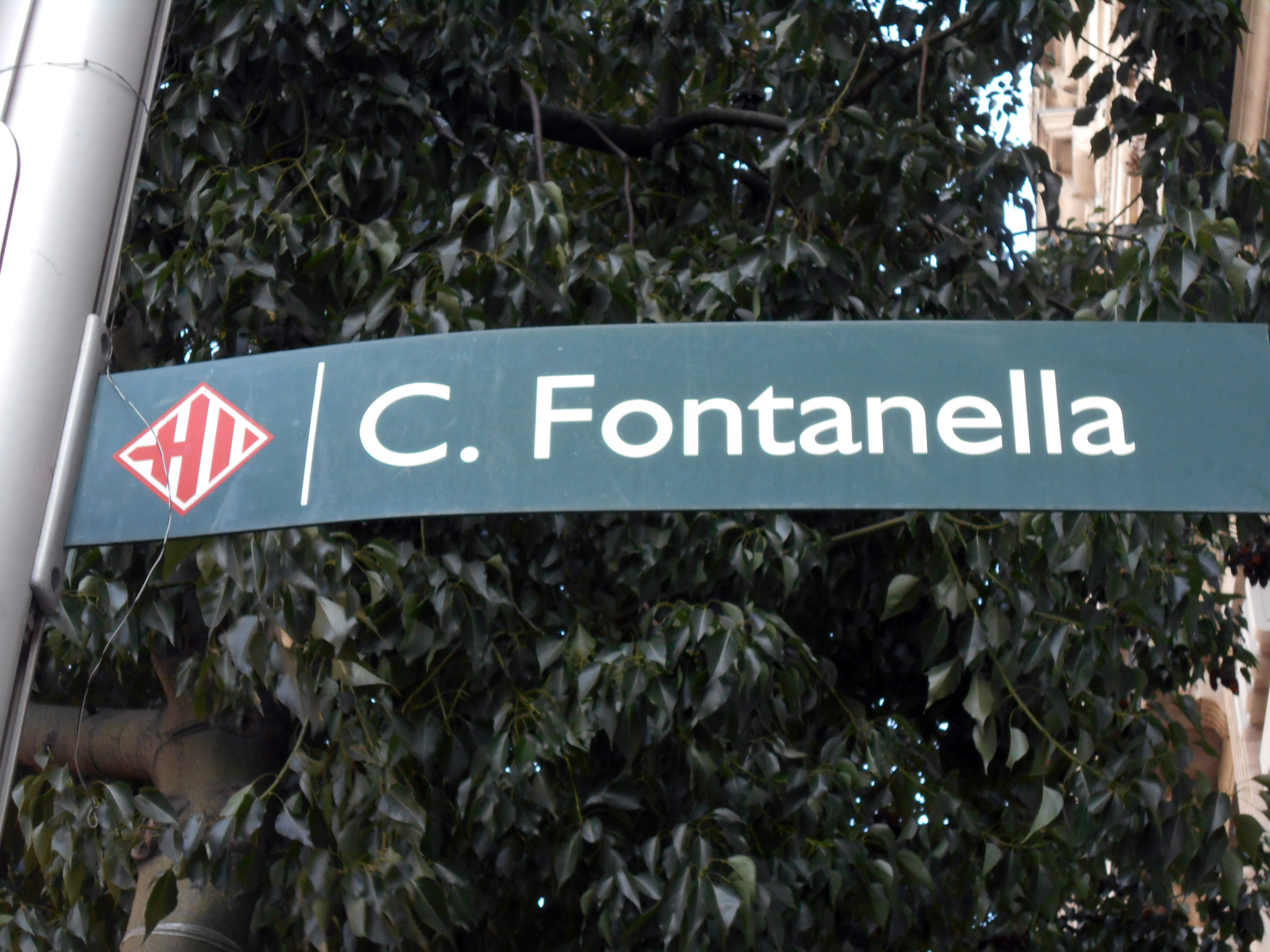
Carrer de Fontanella.

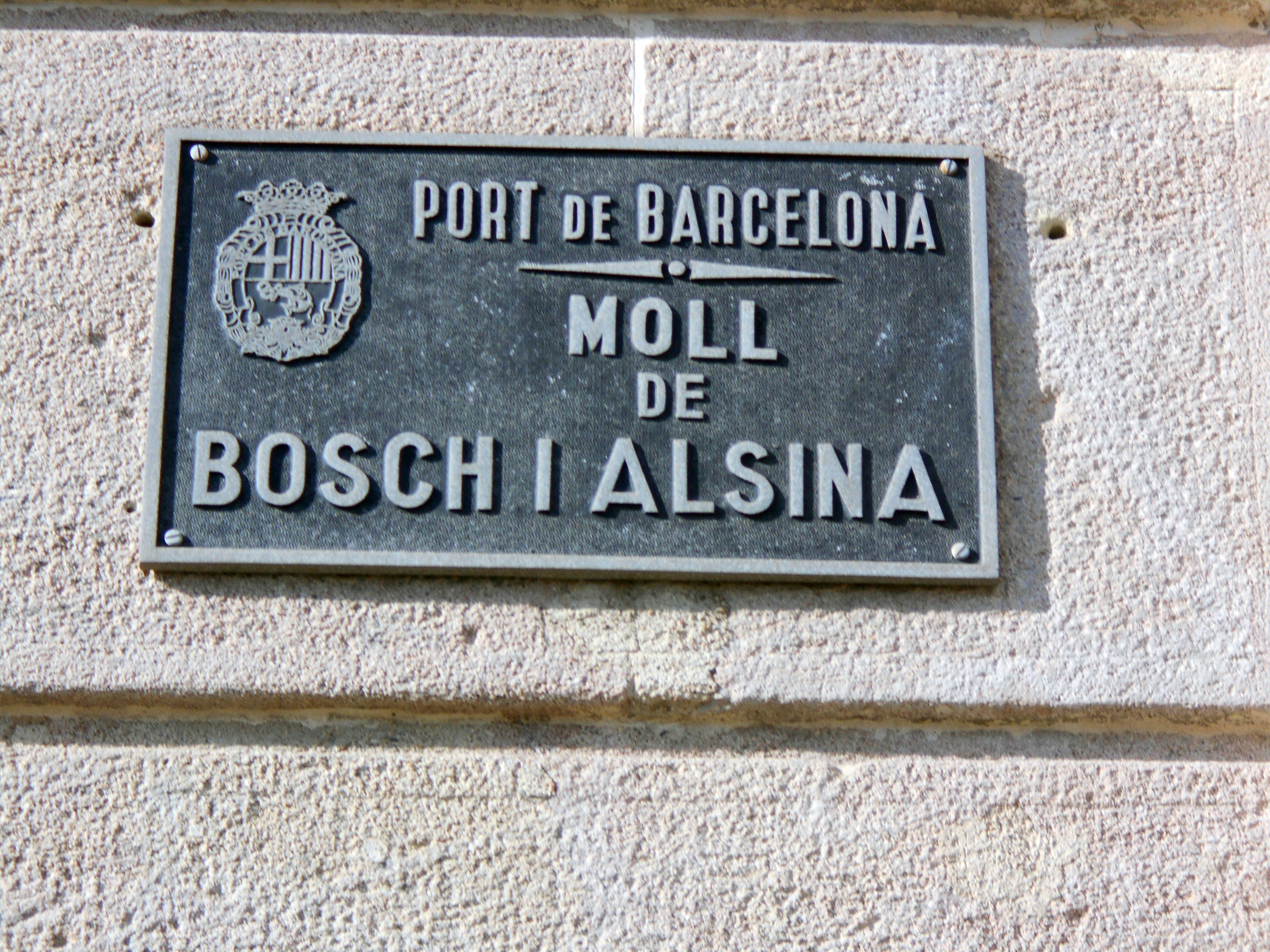
Moll de Bosch i Alsina.

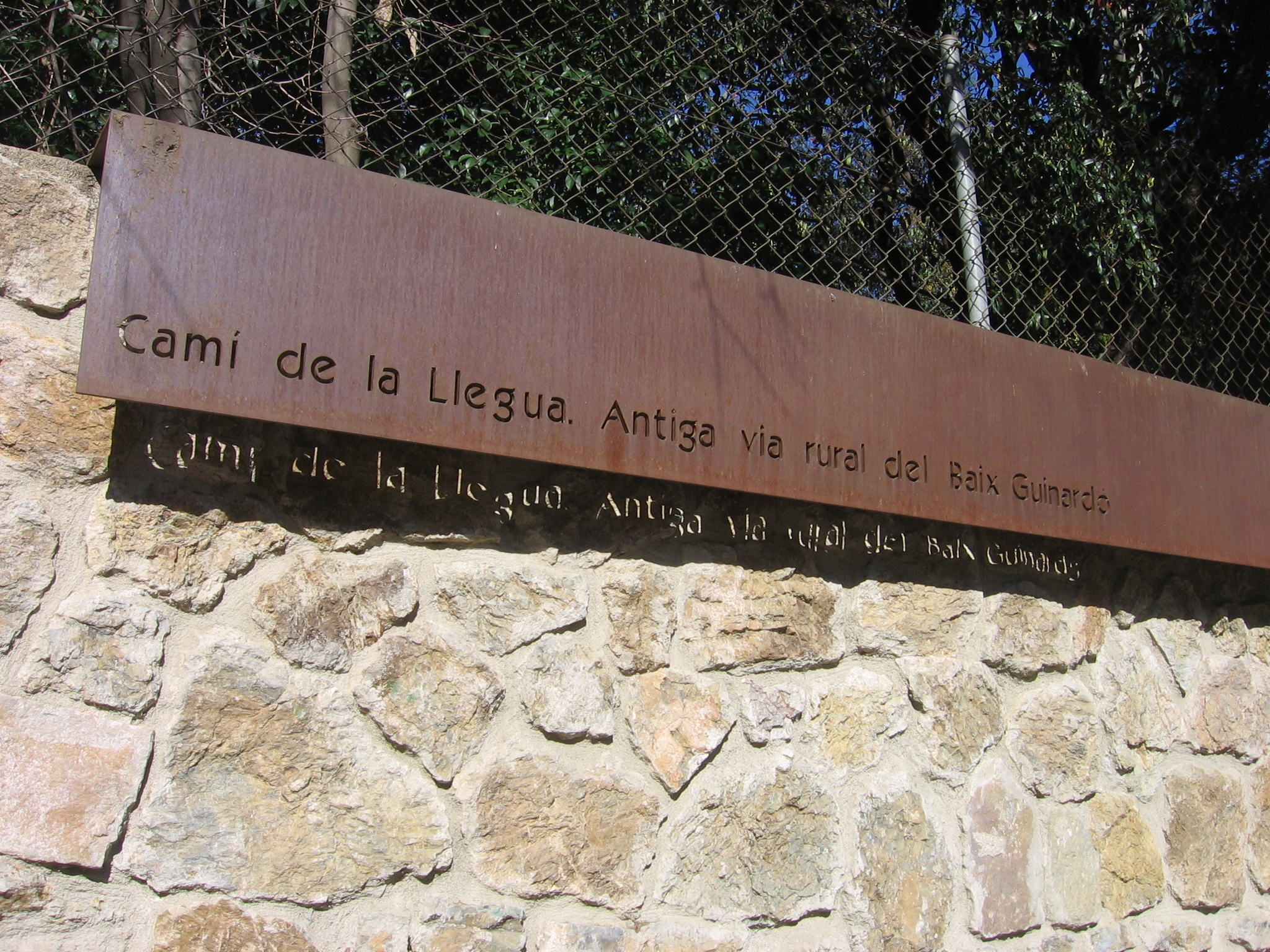
Camí de la Llegua, an old rural road in Baix Guinardó.

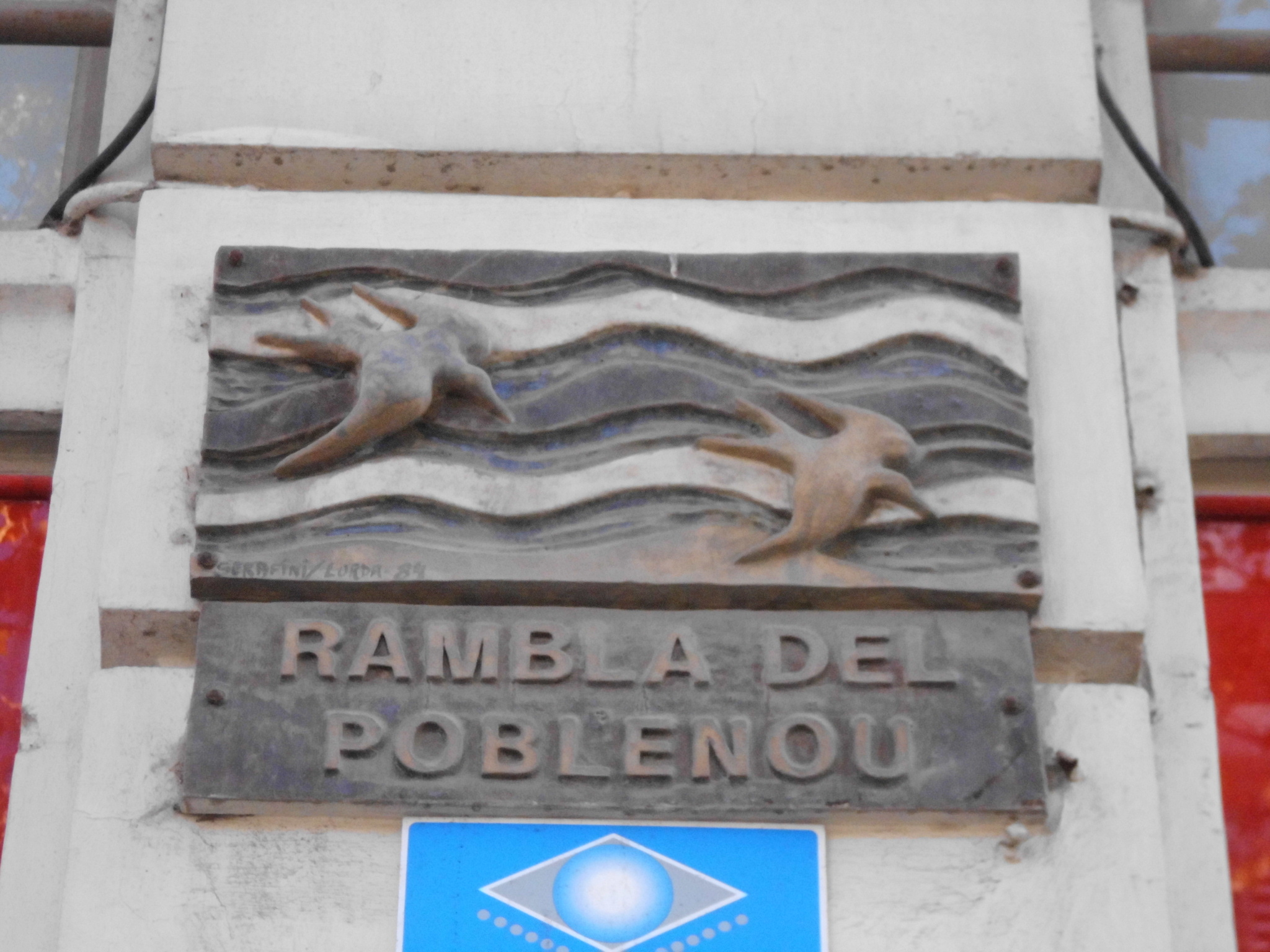
Rambla del Poblenou.

== See also ==
- Architecture of Barcelona
- City Council of Barcelona
- Districts of Barcelona
- History of Barcelona
- Parks and gardens of Barcelona
- Street furniture in Barcelona
- Urban planning of Barcelona
