= Secretary of State for Transport and Sustainable Mobility =

Official of the Ministry of Development of the Government of Spain

- Secretario de Estado de Transportes y Movilidad Sostenible
- Coat of Arms used by the Government

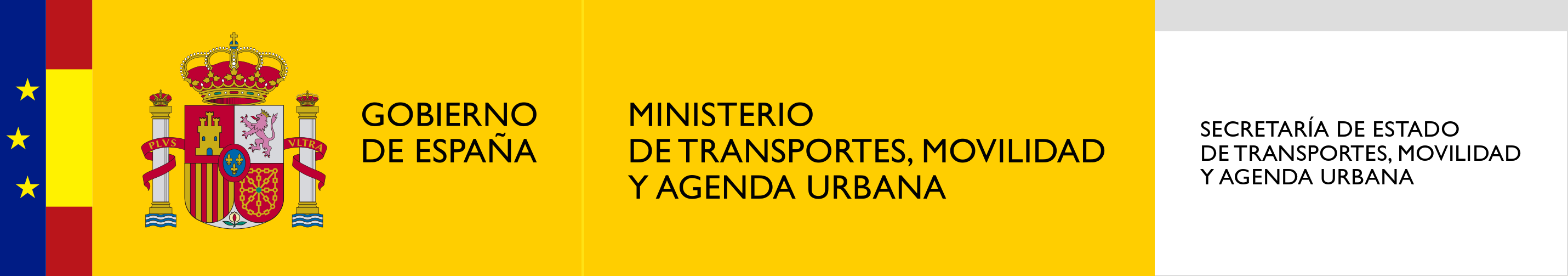

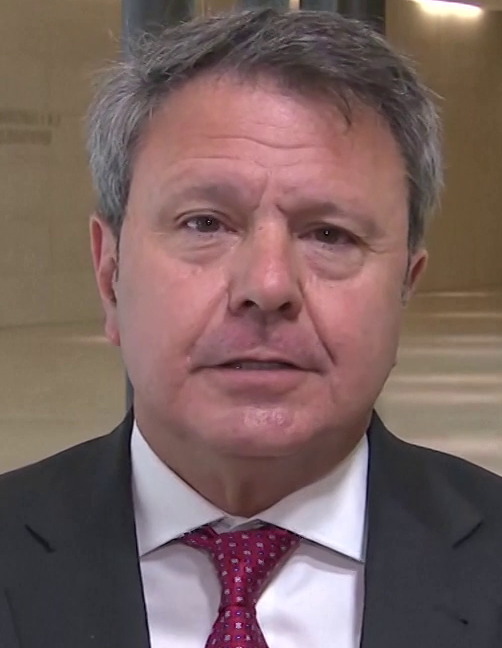
- Incumbent; José Antonio Santano Clavero since November 29, 2023
- Ministry of Transport; Secretariat of State for Transport
- Style: The Most Excellent (formal); Mr. Secretary of State (informal)
- Abbreviation: SETMOS
- Nominator: The Development Minister
- Appointer: The Monarch
- Formation: December 17, 1993; 32 years ago
- First holder: Alberto Zaragoza Rameau
- Website: transportes.gob.es

The secretary of state for transport and sustainable mobility is a senior minister of the Spanish Ministry of Transport responsible for assisting the minister in the design and implementation of the government policy on transport infrastructure and in the regulation of land, maritime and air transport.

The secretary of state is appointed by the Monarch on the advice of the minister of transport. Since 29 November 2023, José Antonio Santano Clavero has served as such.

== History ==
Although there have previously been some Secretariats of State with powers on sustainability and housing, the origin of this secretariat of State dates back to the Royal Decree of 17 December 1993, which created the Secretariat of State for Territorial Policy and Public Works. This secretariat was entrusted with «the preparation of the Infrastructure Master Plan, the National Hydrological Plan and the sectoral plans of the different modes of transport that develop the Master Plan».

In 1996, with the change of name of the Ministry of Development, that Secretariat of State was abolished and the secretary of state for infrastructure and transport was created, assuming a very similar structure to the current one. With this reform, the secretary of state loses the powers on housing that the undersecretary of development assumed.

In May 2000, the Secretariat was renamed the Secretariat of State for Infrastructures, recovering the competences in housing that it exercised through the Directorate-General for Housing, Architecture and Urbanism but losing the competences in transportation, which were transferred to the Undersecretariat.

In 2004, the Secretariat of State was renamed the Secretariat of State for Infrastructure and Planning, losing the competencies in housing that become part of the recovered Ministry of Housing. The transportation responsibilities continued separated when the General Secretariat for Transport was created with direct dependence on the Minister. From 2009 to end 2011 it was called Secretariat of State for Planning and Infrastructure.

Due to the economic crisis and the need to cut public spending, in late 2011 a multitude of competencies spread across various bodies were unified in a single one called Secretariat of State for Infrastructure, Transport and Housing, which was developed with a similar structure to that of the secretary of state for infrastructure and transport of 1996.

By Royal Decree 829/2023, of November 20, as was the case in 2004, it lost its powers over housing, which were assumed by the reestablished Ministry of Housing through the Secretariat of State for Housing and Urban Agenda.

=== Names ===
- Secretary of State for Territorial Policy and Public Works (1993–1996)
- Secretary of State for Infrastructure and Transport (1996–2000)
- Secretary of State for Infrastructure (2000–2004)
- Secretary of State for Infrastructure and Planning (2004–2009)
- Secretary of State for Planning and Infrastructure (2009–2011)
- Secretary of State for Infrastructure, Transport and Housing (2011–2020)
- Secretary of State for Transport, Mobility and Urban Agenda (2020–2023)
- Secretary of State for Transport and Sustainable Mobility (2023–present)

== Organization chart ==
The Secretariat of State is composed by three main departments and three secondary departments:

- The General Secretariat for Land Transport (SGTT)
  It's the department of the SETMOS responsible for promoting the implementation of investments in road transport infrastructure, the planning and evaluation of the National Railway Network, as well as general planning, within the scope of the central government's responsibilities, in the area of road transport and rail transport services. In this sense, it is also responsible for the supervision and management of the railway system through the Railway Safety Agency.
  The SGTT is structured through the Directorate-General for Roads, the Directorate-General for Railway Sector and the Directorate-General for Land Transport and Railways.
- The General Secretariat for Air and Maritime Transport (SGTAM)
  It's the department of the SETMOS that manages the nationwide air and maritime transportation systems.
  The SGTAM is structured through the Directorate-General for Civil Aviation and the Directorate-General for the Merchant Navy. The Spanish Aviation Safety and Security Agency and the Maritime Safety and Rescue Society are attached to this General Secretariat.
- The General Secretariat for Sustainable Mobility (SGMS)
  It's the department of the SETMOS responsible for cross-cutting policies on sustainable mobility.
  The SGMS is structured through a Directorate-General for Mobility Strategies.
- The Unit for Emergencies, Safety and Crisis Management
  This unit assists the secretary of state in the definition, adoption, management, control and evaluation of the necessary measures and actions, in the area of competences attributed to the Ministry of Development, to guarantee the normal activity of the transport services and infrastructures.

Most of the public enterprises and agencies of the Department of Development are attached to the SETMOS.

== List of SEITVs ==
No.	Image	Name	Term of Office			Prime Minister
No.	Image	Name	Began	Ended	Days of Service	Prime Minister
1º		Alberto Zaragoza Rameau	22 December 1993	11 May 1996	871	Felipe González
2º		Joaquín Abril Martorell	11 May 1996	5 September 1998	847	José María Aznar
3º		Albert Vilalta González	5 September 1998	6 May 2000	609	José María Aznar
4º		Benigno Blanco Rodríguez	6 May 2000	20 April 2004	1445	José María Aznar
5º		Víctor Morlán Gracia	20 April 2004	15 April 2008	1456	José Luis Rodríguez Zapatero
6º		Josefina Cruz Villalón	15 April 2008	18 April 2009	368	José Luis Rodríguez Zapatero
7º		Víctor Morlán Gracia	18 April 2009	24 December 2011	980	José Luis Rodríguez Zapatero
8º		Rafael Catalá	24 December 2011	4 October 2014	1015	Mariano Rajoy
9º		Julio Gómez-Pomar Rodríguez	4 October 2014	19 June 2018	1354	Mariano Rajoy
10º		Pedro Saura García	19 June 2018	28 July 2021	1135	Pedro Sánchez
11º		Isabel Pardo de Vera	28 July 2021	22 February 2023	574	Pedro Sánchez
12º		Francisco David Lucas Parrón	22 February 2023	29 November 2023	280	Pedro Sánchez
13º		José Antonio Santano Clavero	29 November 2023	Incumbent	1013	Pedro Sánchez
