= Civil Aviation Accident and Incident Investigation Commission =

Former Spanish national agency

- Comisión de Investigación de Accidentes e Incidentes de Aviación Civil
- Coat of arms of Spain

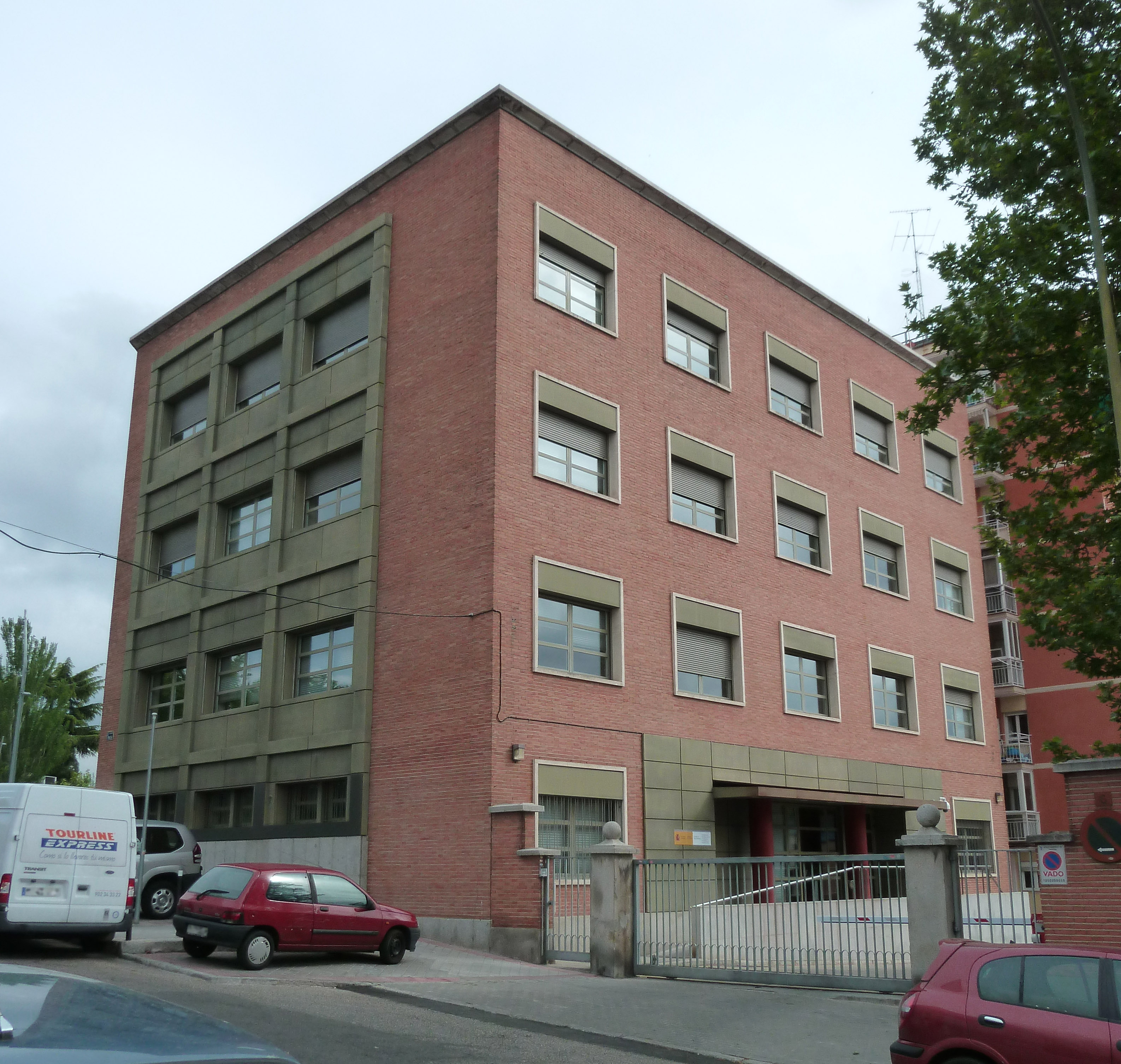
- Former CIAIAC headquarters in Madrid

Agency overview
- Formed: 28 March 1974; 52 years ago
- Dissolved: 15 July 2026; 3 months ago
- Superseding agency: Independent Authority for the Technical Investigation of Accidents and Incidents
- Jurisdiction: Government of Spain
- Headquarters: Latina, Madrid
- Parent department: Ministry of Public Works and Transport

The Civil Aviation Accident and Incident Investigation Commission (Spanish: Comisión de Investigación de Accidentes e Incidentes de Aviación Civil, CIAIAC) was, from 28 March 1974 to 15 July 2026, the Spanish national agency responsible for air accident investigation. It was a division of the Ministry of Public Works and Transport. The CIAIAC investigated all accidents and incidents of civil aircraft that took place in Spanish territory.

The CIAIAC also maintained detailed statistics of all the air accidents and incidents in Spain.

The headquarters of the CIAIAC were in Latina, Madrid.

It was replaced by the Independent Authority for the Technical Investigation of Accidents and Incidents.

== See also ==
- Aviation safety
- Binter Mediterráneo Flight 8261
- Britannia Airways Flight 226A
- Dan-Air Flight 1008
- Comisión de Investigación de Accidentes Ferroviarios
- Spanair Flight 5022
- Standing Commission for Maritime Accident and Incident Investigations
- Tenerife airport disaster
