= Víctor Morlán Gracia =

Spanish politician (born 1947)

Víctor Morlán

Secretary of State for Planning and Infrastructure
- In office 18 April 2009 – 24 December 2011
- Prime Minister: José Luis Rodríguez Zapatero
- Preceded by: Josefina Cruz Villalón
- Succeeded by: Rafael Catalá
- In office 20 April 2004 – 15 April 2008
- Preceded by: Benigno Blanco Rodríguez
- Succeeded by: Josefina Cruz Villalón

Secretary of State for Planning and Institutional Relations
- In office 15 April 2004 – 18 April 2009
- Prime Minister: José Luis Rodríguez Zapatero
- Preceded by: Office established
- Succeeded by: Office abolished

Member of the Congress of Deputies for Huesca
- In office 15 July 1986 – 22 April 2008
- Monarch: Juan Carlos I
- Succeeded by: María Teresa Villagrasa Pérez

Personal details
- Born: 9 May 1947 (age 78) Huesca, Spain
- Party: Spanish Socialist Workers' Party (PSOE)
- Children: two

Víctor Morlán Gracia (born 9 May 1947) is a Spanish politician. He served as Secretary of State for Planning and Institutional Relations from 2008 to 2009 and as Secretary of State for Planning and Infrastructure from 2004 to 2008 and from 2009 to 2011 in the Ministry of Public Works and Transport in the government of José Luis Rodríguez Zapatero. Morlán graduated in law, and joined the civil service in 1986.

He has been a member of the Spanish Socialist Workers' Party (PSOE) since 1978, and was elected to the Congress of Deputies in 1986 for the province of Huesca (Aragon). He was named Secretary of State for Planning and Infrastructure, the number two position in the Ministry of Public Works and Transport, in 2004. The post was renamed Secretary of State for Planning and Institutional Relations after the 2008 elections. Morlán resigned his seat in the Congress of Deputies after his reappointment as Secretary of State so as to dedicate himself to his position in government: he was replaced by María Teresa Villagrasa Pérez, who had been number three on the PSOE list for Huesca in the 2008 elections.
