= CIAF =

CIAF may refer to:

- Cairns Indigenous Art Fair, an art fair in Cairns, Queensland, Australia
- Comisión de Investigación de Accidentes Ferroviarios, a Spanish government agency which investigates rail accidents
- Commissione Italiana d'Armistizio con la Francia, a temporary civil and military body charged with implementing the 1940 Franco-Italian armistice
