= Standing Commission for Maritime Accident and Incident Investigations =

CIAIM logo

The Standing Commission for Maritime Accident and Incident Investigations (Spanish: Comisión Permanente de Investigación de Accidentes e Incidentes Marítimos, CIAIM) was, until 15 July 2026, an agency of the Spanish government that investigated maritime accidents and incidents. It was a division of the Ministry of Public Works and Transport. Its head office was in Madrid.

It was replaced by the Independent Authority for the Technical Investigation of Accidents and Incidents.

== See also ==
- Civil Aviation Accident and Incident Investigation Commission
- Comisión de Investigación de Accidentes Ferroviarios
