= Villagrasa =

Villagrasa is a surname. Notable people with the surname include:

- Alex Villagrasa (born 1997), Andorran footballer
- María Teresa Villagrasa Pérez (born 1957), Spanish schoolteacher and politician
