= Directorate General of Civil Aviation (Spain) =

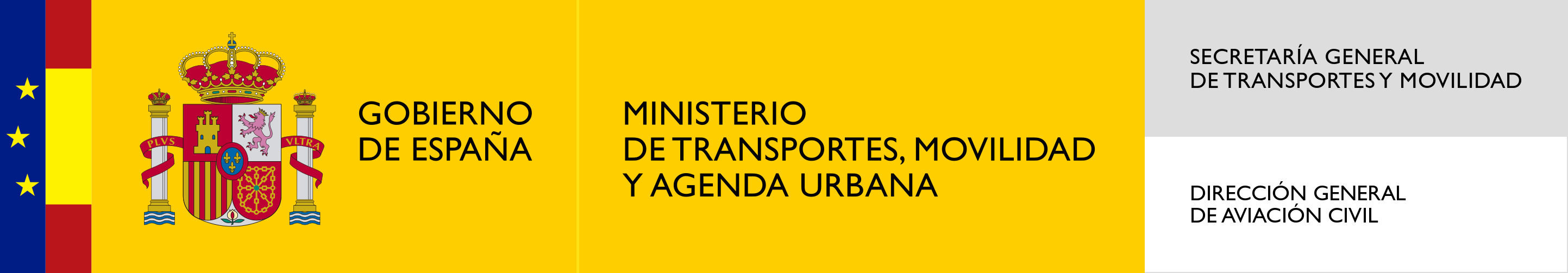
Logo of the Directorate-General

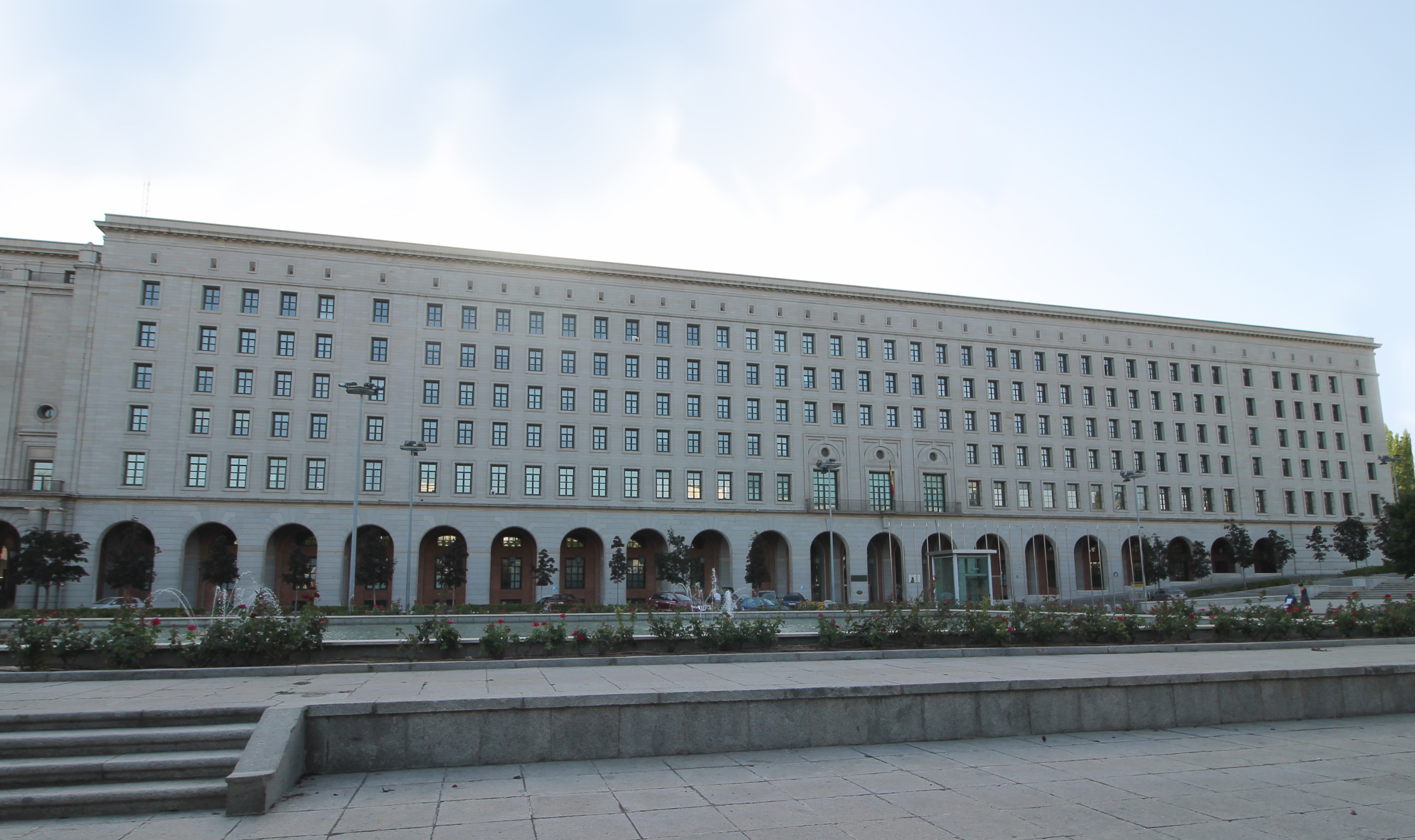
Nuevos Ministerios, home of the Spanish Ministry of Public Works and Transport and its Civil Aviation Department.

The Directorate General of Civil Aviation (Spanish: Dirección General de Aviación Civil, DGAC) is a division of Spain's Ministry of Public Works. Its office is in the Nuevos Ministerios complex (Paseo de la Castellana, 67) in Madrid.

It is the former civil aviation authority of Spain. The current authority, the Spanish Aviation Safety and Security Agency, was established in 2008 and is attached to the DGAC.
