= Ryanair racism incident =

2018 incident involving racial abuse on a Ryanair flight

On 19 October 2018, an incident occurred on a Ryanair flight FR9015 from Barcelona to London Stansted. During the incident, David Mesher, a 70-year-old white man from Birmingham, racially abused Delsie Gayle, a 77-year-old black woman from East London, who was seated next to him. After she was slow to move from her seat, he became abusive, using expletives against her and referring to her as a "stupid ugly cow" and an "ugly black bastard". Various passengers and staff asked Mesher to desist from his behaviour. Staff ultimately decided that he should remain in his seat rather than being removed from the plane, with Gayle being asked to move seats instead.

Another passenger, David Lawrence, filmed the incident and posted the footage to social media; he commented that he wanted to raise wider public awareness of the racist incidents that black Caribbean people experience. There, it gained widespread attention; international mainstream media coverage followed. A number of prominent politicians condemned the incident and Ryanair's response to it. Ryanair were criticised for not removing Mesher from the plane and handing him over to Spanish police; for moving Gayle rather than Mesher; and for failing to appropriately apologise to her after the incident.

Several days later, police revealed that they had discovered Mesher's identity and gave the information to the Spanish authorities. Barcelona City Council announced that it had instructed its public prosecutor to determine whether his actions constituted a hate crime under Spanish law. A week after the incident, Mesher publicly apologised to Gayle on the ITV Breakfast television show Good Morning Britain and rejected the idea that he was racist. Gayle did not accept the apology; her daughter rejected his claims to not be racist.

== Background ==
At the time of the incident, David Mesher was seventy years old. A former railway worker, he was once employed by British Rail at the ticket office of London Waterloo station and later by London Midland Railway as a train announcer. He formerly lived in Barking, East London with his mother, but after her death, he had moved to Birmingham, where by 2018, he was living in a sheltered accommodation housing block in the Yardley Wood area of the city.

One former colleague expressed surprise at Mesher's actions during the incident, noting that when "[Mesher] was in the ticket office at Waterloo station[…] [he] was always so polite. He would not be rude to anyone, otherwise he would not have been dealing with the public. It was a real shock to see him and the vile language that he used". While in Yardley Wood, he had had problems with various neighbours; reporters found one who called him "a racist pig and bully", while another said "no one really likes him. He keeps himself to himself and we don't know much about him". One resident living adjacent to him called him a "strange man" and noted that they "had problems" with him in the past. One related that Mesher had "no respect for other people", and that in one incident Mesher had been "driving me mad by playing music loudly and continuously on a loop. I banged on his door to ask him to turn it down and he wasn't even in. How inconsiderate is that?"

At the time living in East London, Delsie Gayle was seventy-seven years old and was a retired care assistant; she had moved to Britain from Jamaica during the 1960s as part of the "Windrush generation". In late 2017, her husband—to whom she had been married for over fifty years—died. Her daughter observed that she was "feeling really down and depressed" and decided to take her on a holiday to Spain so that it might "raise her spirits".

== Incident ==
The incident took place on 19 October 2018 on the Ryanair flight FR9015 from Barcelona to London Stansted; it occurred before take-off, while the plane was still on Spanish territory. In the incident, Mesher sought to get past Gayle, who was in the aisle seat, to access his window seat. Gayle, whose mobility was affected by arthritis, was slow to move out of his way. At this point, Gayle's daughter explained to Mesher that her mother was disabled. Mesher's response was that "I don't care whether she's fucking disabled or not - if I tell her to get out then she gets out." A flight attendant appeared and asked Gayle if she would like to move; she responded that she wanted to remain close to her daughter. At this, Mesher stated: "Move her to another seat... I can't get in while she's sat there." Gayle responded with: "You smell. You need a wash", to which Mesher followed with "If you don't go to another seat, I'll push you to another seat." The argument continued. After she spoke to him in English with a Jamaican accent, Mesher said: "Don't talk to me in a fucking foreign language you stupid ugly cow." Another passenger intervened, asking Mesher to stop being abusive. His response was that "I will carry on as far as I can with this ugly black bastard."

"The underlying reason behind the man's abusive behaviour comes down to the fact that my mum is a black woman and he didn’t want her sitting next to him - he says it in the video."

— Gayle's daughter

Several passengers called for Mesher to be removed from the plane. A flight attendant told him that he was being "super rude" and asked him to calm down before stating that he would have to ask his supervisor what course of action should be taken. Ultimately, Mesher was not removed from the flight. He was allowed to remain in his seat while Gayle was asked to move from hers, which she did; Mesher then told staff that "I'm alright, now she's gone". Gayle's daughter subsequently related that the cabin crew denied hearing Mesher use racial slurs and told her to call Ryanair customer services on 22 October.

A fellow passenger, David Lawrence—who like Gayle was of Caribbean heritage—filmed the incident and posted it to social media. He explained that "for many years a lot of the West Indian community have gone through these types of incidents in Britain, but have never been able to share it with the public or the world. So I decided that I had the opportunity to film this, as difficult as it was". In his view, it was important that the public be made aware "that these incidents take place" and that this was something that could now be achieved through "the power of social media". He noted that one fellow passenger called him "childish" for filming the incident. Lawrence criticised the response of both fellow passengers and the plane's staff, adding that he had seen individuals escorted off of planes before for less serious actions. After being uploaded on the 20 October, the footage was widely circulated on social media and attracted the attention of mainstream media in both the UK and abroad. Within several days, it had been viewed millions of times.

== Response ==
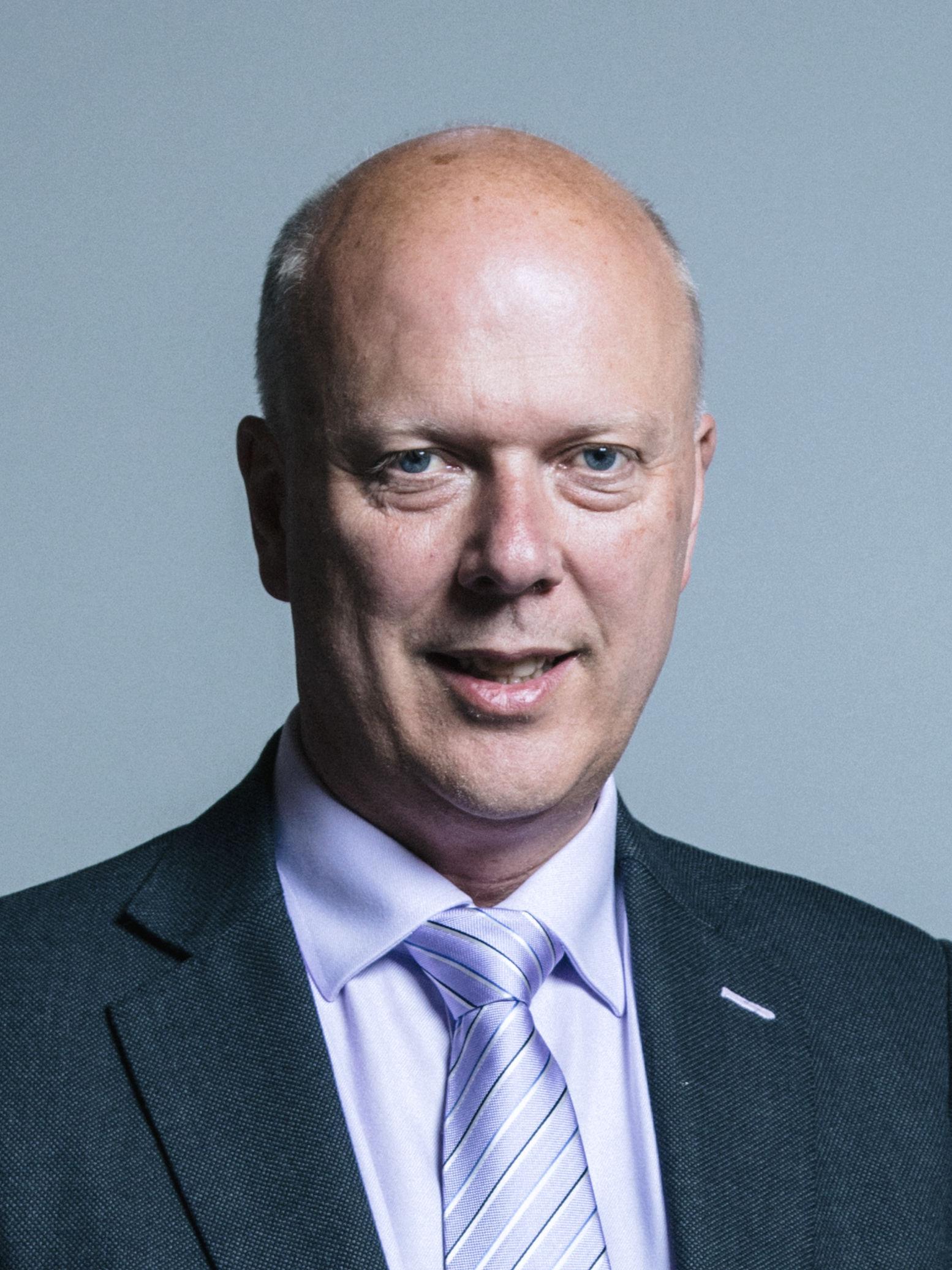
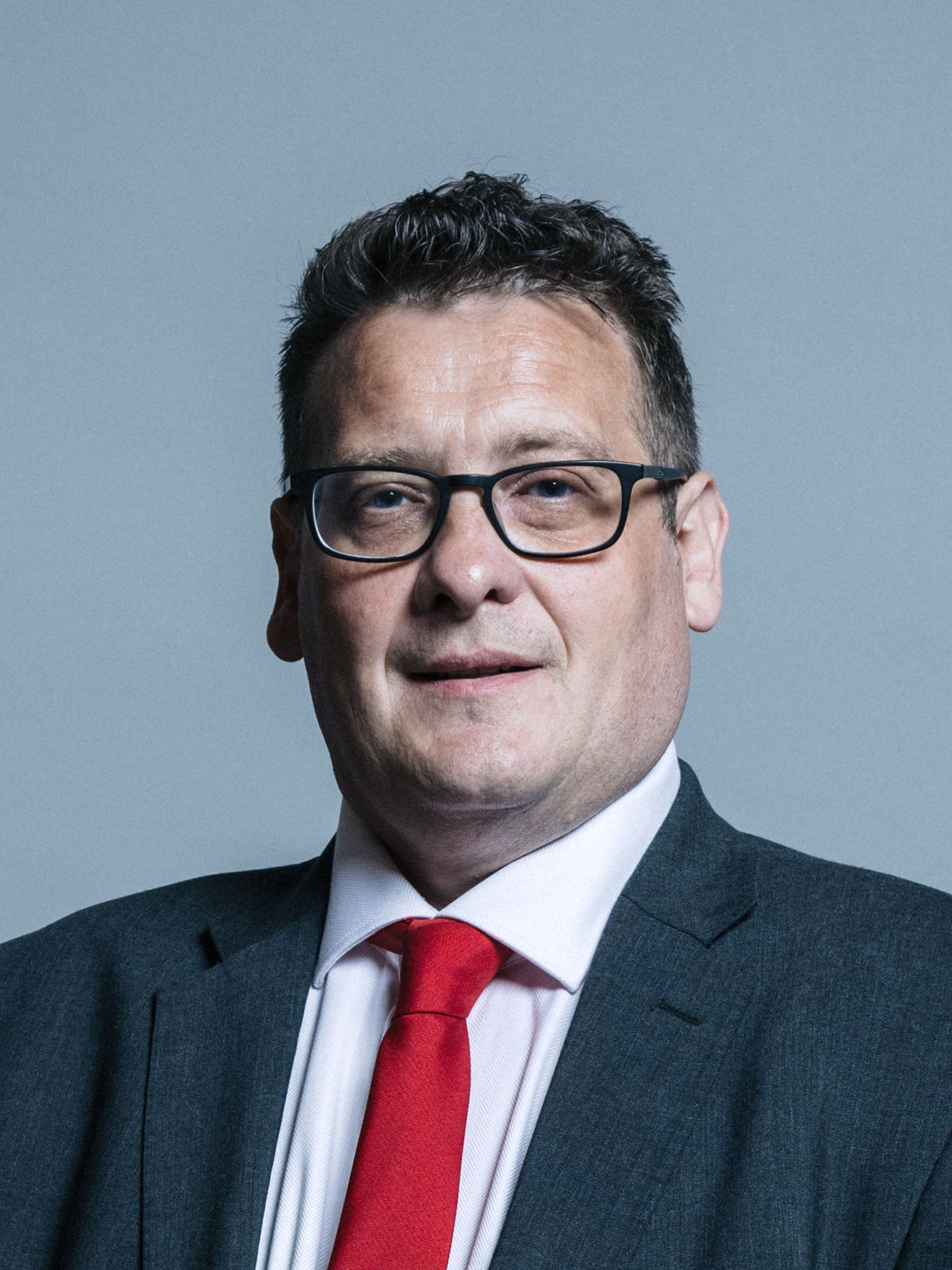
The incident was condemned by both Transport Secretary Chris Grayling (left) and Shadow Transport Minister Karl Turner (right)

Various politicians spoke out at what they regarded as Ryanair's lack of appropriate action in the incident. Chris Grayling, the Secretary of State for Transport, appeared on the BBC's Today programme, where he stated that the incident was "totally unacceptable" and expressed the hope that "police would want to take action in such an extraordinarily unacceptable case". Karl Turner, the Member of Parliament for Kingston upon Hull East, tweeted that Mesher "should have been removed from the flight and handed over to the police". Turner added that if the plane was in the UK at the time of the incident then a criminal offence had definitely been committed. Later speaking to BBC Radio 4's The World at One, Turner expressed concern that Mesher would escape criminal prosecution because there was no extradition arrangement for events of this nature and thus Mesher might not face Spanish prosecutors unless he handed himself over willingly; "I doubt whether he's going to do that."

Stuart McMillan, the Member of the Scottish Parliament (MSP) for Greenock and Inverclyde, tweeted to state that "This is really appalling Ryanair. You will know the identity of the man and the level of training given to your staff." Margaret Ferrier, the Member of Parliament for Rutherglen and Hamilton West, tweeted that the footage was "utterly disgusting" and that the flight attendant was "incapable of responding appropriately" to the "racist male passenger". Ferrier later tweeted that Ryanair's CEO Michael O'Leary should personally call Gayle to "apologise profusely for the incompetence of his flight attendant in handling this racial abuse incident properly." The MP Dawn Butler wrote a letter to Ryanair, accusing them of "empowering a racist" by failing to act against Mesher at the time of the incident. She added the view that it was "particularly sad" that this occurred during Black History Month. Gayle's local MP, John Cryer, stated he would raise the issue through an early day motion in the House of Commons. Jeremy Corbyn, the leader of the Labour Party, expressed his intention of contacting Gayle about the incident.

After the footage appeared online, various calls were made to boycott Ryanair over their response; among those endorsing such a boycott was the MP David Lammy. A Change.org petition was launched calling on Ryanair to apologise and compensate Gayle for her experience. On 21 October, Ryanair tweeted that it had reported the issue to Essex Police and that "As this is now a police matter, we cannot comment further". This public statement did not include an apology to Gayle. Ryanair stated that they contacted Gayle on that same day, with a letter sent both by post and email.

Reporter Jeremy Vine tweeted his criticism of Ryanair, stating that "they need to explain how this man's disgusting racial abuse of the black lady in the seat next to him ends up with HER being asked to move. It is beyond belief."

"The idea that black people must have somehow been complicit in their own mistreatment is so deeply entrenched that a frail pensioner was treated like a scrapper in a pub brawl, moved away from her abuser as he assures people "I'm alright". We love to say "no smoke without fire", but it's this very mentality that allows racism, and most particularly anti-black racism, to thrive in modern society."

— Biba Kang, in The Independent

Writing in The Independent, Helen Coffey noted that the incident raised questions regarding "the rules of jurisdiction" when it comes to aviation, highlighting that it was often a "grey area". Also in an op-ed for The Independent, Biba Kang highlighted the fact that the incident came to light on the same day that the Doctor Who episode "Rosa"—featuring an encounter with the African-American civil rights activist Rosa Parks in 1950s Alabama—was first screened on British television. For Kang, the two occurrences reflected "how far we've come since the inception of the civil rights movement, while also reminding us how far we have left to go." Kang saw both the Doctor Who episode and the Ryanair incident as evidence that "black people are treated as aggressors in scenarios where they are really the victim"; in Gayle's example because staff treated her as if she was equally guilty as Mesher in the argument and was asked to move seats. He linked this to the "racist stereotype that black people are innately confrontational or aggressive", so that when they are faced with racial abuse their angry responses are regarded as "evidence that the abuse was provoked" in the first place.

Writing for HuffPost, Nadine White and Lucy Pasha-Robinson noted that for many black British people, the footage about the incident was "shocking, but not surprising." White and Pasha-Robinson noted that many of the black Britons they talked to could relate experiences of "everyday racism" that they had encountered in their lives, such as being referred to as "golliwogs" or "niggers" by strangers or neighbours, being followed by store security when entering shops, and encountering racial abuse on social media. In an op-ed for The Guardian, Hugh Muir cautioned that Mesher "may not be able to take responsibility for his actions. If he is, he is damned by them, by the knowledge that his show of inhumanity was seen by millions, by the terrible certainty that his dark side is forever transparent." He praised Lawrence for filming the incident and thus ensuring that it "became a cause celebre" but criticised other passengers on the plane who "sat by – keener to get home perhaps than to stand up for an elderly woman being racially abused". Ultimately, he described the incident as being "like the Rosa Parks story enacted in reverse".

=== Police investigation ===
On 23 October, Essex Police revealed that they had ascertained the identity of the man and had passed his details on to the Spanish authorities. West Midlands Police co-operated with their Essex counterpart and spoke to Mesher at his home. Also on 23 October, the Daily Mail publicly revealed Mesher's identity, which before then had not been known to the public. Reporters from the Daily Mail tried to talk to him; he responded by locking himself in his flat and telling them: "Go away, there's nothing to say". Reporters assembled outside the housing block in which Mesher lived. A spokesperson for Optivo, the company which manages the block, stated that "we do not condone abusive behaviour in any form. As this matter is now being handled by the police we are unable to make any further comment at this stage."

Barcelona's city council stated that it would treat the incident as a potential hate crime, with its deputy mayor Jaume Asens stating that they had passed the information to the public prosecutor to determine if criminal charges could be brought. On Twitter, he tweeted that "Barcelona is a welcoming and anti-racist city. All support to the victim." The Mayor of Barcelona, Ada Colau, called the footage "unbearable" and said that Barcelona "wouldn't take this lying down". She praised the man responsible for filming the incident, stating that by doing so he had "brought to public attention an event that can't go unpunished". A spokesperson for Spain's Civil Guard stated that the issue was a matter for the British police because the plane had been bound for the UK. Spain's Aviation Safety and Security Agency stated: "We think what happened, and the racist comments made, were terrible... But our responsibility is aircraft safety and we're looking into whether or not this comes under our responsibility."

=== Responses from the Gayles and Mesher ===
On 22 October, Gayle and her daughter were interviewed by ITV News. Commenting on the incident, Gayle related that she was "shocked, nobody ever said those words to me [before]... I travel a lot, I go to Canada... and no-one has ever said those words to me". She explained that the abuse made her "feel very low. He paid a fare to go on holiday, I've paid mine so why does he abuse me for that due to the colour of my skin?" She added the view that if Mesher "gets away" with the incident, then he would "do it to somebody else". Gayle stated that she had not been contacted by Ryanair since the incident and would not use the company again. Her daughter told ITV News that Ryanair's response had been poor; "on the plane it was unprofessional, and after it was unprofessional... It's all wrong, I just believe they need more training". She also expressed the view that aboard the plane, "nothing was done and I know if that was a black person racially abusing an elderly woman the police would have been called. When I saw the video I felt [Ryanair staff behaved as if] he was the victim - that's the way RyanAir was treating it."

On 25 October, Carol Gayle told journalists from HuffPost that "Both mum and I are emotionally and mentally drained... Mum hasn't been able to eat much since this all happened and she had something today. She's keen to raise awareness about what happened to her, so it doesn't happen to anyone else". She added that "I hope that some justice will be done because people can't go around racially abusing people – no way", and thanked "everyone who has supported us, shared articles about it and got behind the cause. I didn’t expect the scale of this, at all. It’s worldwide! The love and support is so nice."

On 26 October, Mesher appeared on the ITV Breakfast television show Good Morning Britain, where he stated that he "absolutely" regretted his behaviour in the incident. He added: "I probably lost my temper a bit and ordered her to get up. I'm not a racist person by any means and it's just a fit of temper at the time, I think. I apologise for all the distress you've had there and since." Gayle refused to accept his apology. She stated that "You must forget and forgive but it's going to take a long time for me to get over what he has done to me". Gayle's daughter rejected Mesher's protestation that he was not racist, stating that "if he wasn't racist" then he would not have used the words he used during the incident. Mesher's views on this point were also critiqued by Stephen Bush in the New Statesman. Bush felt that Mesher's claim to not being a racist was "a perfect illustration of the widespread delusion that being racist is a moral condition, only practiced by the immoral, rather than a specific pattern of behaviour." He noted that Mesher's statement that Gayle was a "black bastard" and his claim that she was speaking in a "foreign language" when she spoke English with her Jamaican accent were "palpably" racist but that he, like many British people, continued to believe that only totally immoral people could be "racist". He added that Mesher's public comments were a "non-apology", for Mesher had only apologised for the "distress" Gayle experienced and not for his original comments.

Also on 26 October, the Gayles stated that Ryanair's staff had not apologised to them and that the company's claims that it had done so were "lies". In response, Ryanair publicly stated that "Our customer care team contacted the Gayle family on Sunday." The company added: "We again extend our very sincere apologies to this passenger for the regrettable, and unacceptable remarks that were made to her by an adjacent passenger, and we believe that by reporting this matter immediately to the Essex Police and by apologising in writing to this customer early on Sunday morning, Ryanair treated it with the urgency and seriousness it warranted." It stipulated that the staff aboard the flight had been aware of the argument when it happened but only learned that Mesher had used racist language when they were shown footage of the incident once landed at London Stansted. It noted that at the time of the incident, "the cabin crew believed they were dealing with an argument between two passengers" and thus "followed company procedure, to defuse the argument," through separating "the passengers by offering to move one to alternative seating".
