= Britannia Airways Flight 226A =

1999 aviation accident in Spain

Coordinates: 41.8991°N 2.7557°E

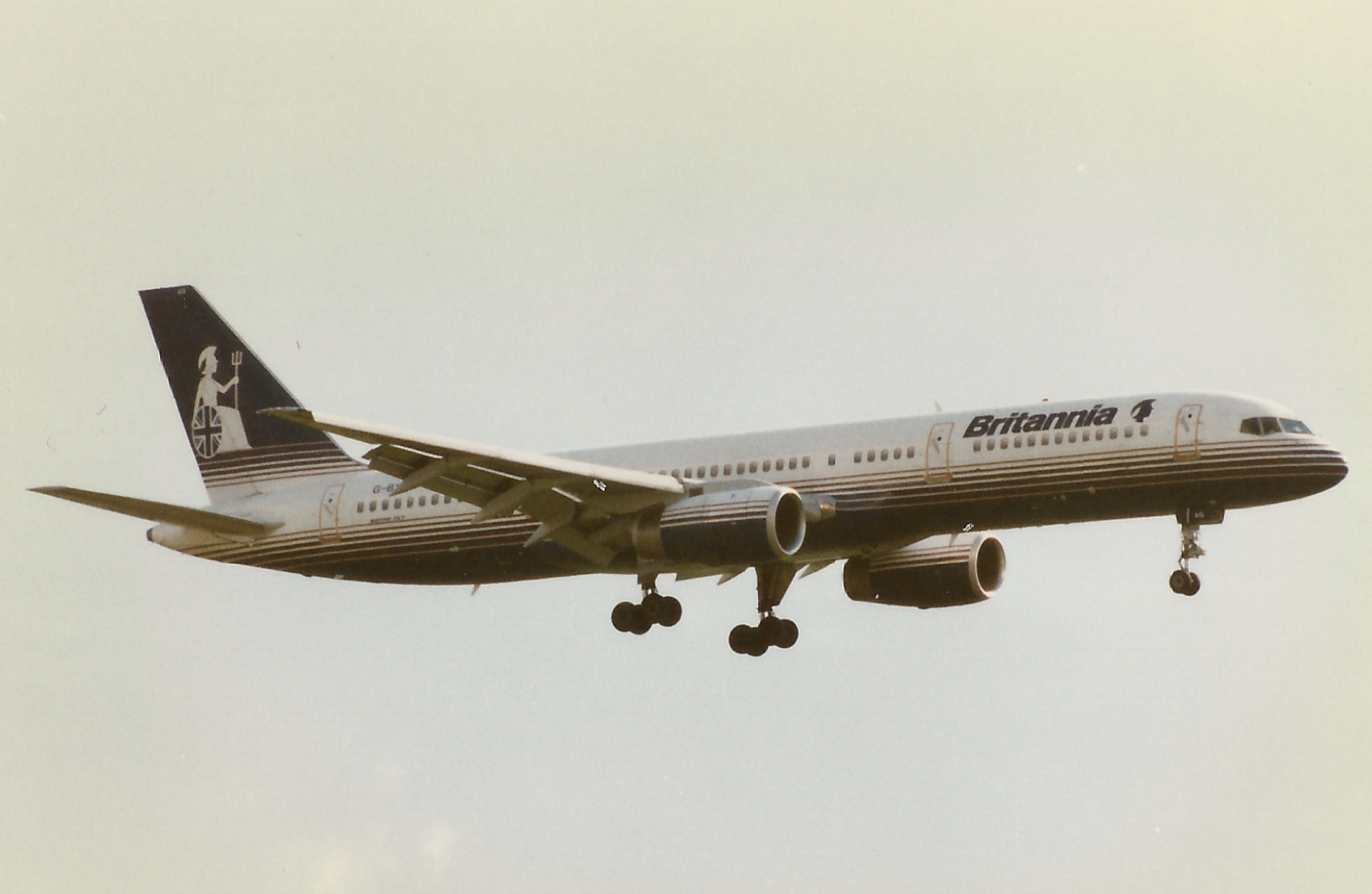
- G-BYAG, the aircraft involved in the accident, seen in 1996

Accident
- Date: 14 September 1999
- Summary: Runway excursion due to destabilised approach
- Site: Girona–Costa Brava Airport, Girona, Spain

Aircraft
- Aircraft type: Boeing 757-204
- Operator: Britannia Airways
- IATA flight No.: BY226A
- ICAO flight No.: BAL226A
- Call sign: BRITANNIA 226A
- Registration: G-BYAG
- Flight origin: Cardiff Airport, Vale of Glamorgan, United Kingdom
- Destination: Girona–Costa Brava Airport, Girona, Spain
- Occupants: 245
- Passengers: 236
- Crew: 9
- Fatalities: 1
- Injuries: 43
- Survivors: 244

Britannia Airways Flight 226A was an international passenger flight from Cardiff, Wales to Girona, Spain, operated by charter airline Britannia Airways. On 14 September 1999, the Boeing 757 aircraft suffered a crash landing and broke apart during a thunderstorm in Girona-Costa Brava Airport. Of the 236 passengers and nine crew on board, two were seriously injured and 41 sustained minor injuries. One of the passengers who had apparently sustained only minor injuries died five days later of unsuspected internal injuries. The aircraft involved in the crash, Boeing 757-204 registration G-BYAG, was damaged beyond economical repair and scrapped.

The body that was responsible for the investigation of the crash, the Civil Aviation Accident and Incident Investigation Commission (CIAIAC), concluded that the crash had been caused by destabilized approach, loss of external reference and loss of automatic height callouts while landing in Girona. The aircraft entered a high rate of descent with a nose down attitude, creating an impact that was violent enough to dislodge the nose landing gear to the back and caused it to crash onto the aircraft's main electrical unit, resulting in an electrical failure that disabled all deceleration systems and in a sudden production of unwanted forward thrust. The aircraft was unable to stop and eventually veered off the runway.

== Background ==
=== Aircraft ===
The aircraft involved was a Boeing 757-204 registered as G-BYAG. It was manufactured by Boeing Commercial Airplanes in 1992 with a manufacturer serial number of 26965 and was delivered to Britannia Airways in 1993. Two Rolls-Royce turbofan engines were installed on the aircraft. It was configured with 235 passenger seats, most being triple seat units. The aircraft had accumulated a total airframe hours of 26,429 hours in 9,816 cycles.

The nose landing gear support structure was attached to the wheel well. At the aft of the wheel well was a structure that was referred as the "doghouse". The structure was a robust, rectangular shape which made up the aircraft's wheel well. Located directly behind the doghouse was the main equipment centre (MEC), which housed the aircraft's electrical power control and electronic units. The unit powered many essential units of the aircraft, including the autobrake, antiskid, spoilers, and the flight recorders.

The thrust of the engines, including the amount of thrust and the type of thrust, was controlled by the pilots through cables that ran under the fuselage. The cables were controlled with tensioned pulley system. Depending on the type of rotation, the pulley system would provide either forward thrust or reverse thrust to the engines. The two cables, consisted of cable A and cable B, would eventually go through the designated powerplant control units, one on each side of the aircraft. If the A cable was pulled by the pulley then the forward thrust would increase. Pulling the B cable would increase the reverse thrust.

=== Passengers and crew ===
A total of 236 passengers were on board the aircraft, all of whom were part of a tour that had been organized by Thomson Travel. Spanish newspaper El Mundo reported that there were 3 children on board and all 236 passengers were of British origin. There were also 9 crew members on board, consisted of 2 flight crew and 7 cabin crew. The pilot was identified as 57-year-old Captain Brendan Nolan. Described by fellow pilots as one of the most experienced pilots in Britannia Airways, he had accumulated a total of 16,700 flying hours, of which 3,562 hours were on the type. The name of the 33-year-old co-pilot was undisclosed, but he was far less experienced, having just 1,494 flying hours, most of which were on the Boeing 757.

== Flight ==
Flight 226A was a passenger flight from the Welsh capital of Cardiff to Girona, serving the popular tourist region of the Costa Brava. Operated by United Kingdom's largest charter airline Britannia Airways, the flight had been chartered by UK's travel company Thomson Travel. Passengers aboard the aircraft were part of a tour that had been organized by Thomson.

The flight was scheduled to take off on 14 September 1999 for Girona-Costa Brava Airport, with Barcelona, Reus and Toulouse in France as alternate airports. The flight took off from Cardiff Airport at 20:40 BST with 236 passengers and 9 crew members on board. Before taking off from Cardiff, the crew had been briefed on the weather forecast in Girona. The briefing concluded that thunderstorms would be present at the destination airport and all three alternate airports. The crew had taken an additional 15 minutes of fuel reserve for possible delays.

Approaching Girona, the crew asked for the updated weather information. Girona ATC indicated that the thunderstorm near the airport would prevail during the approach and landing phase^{[Note 1]}. The storm was located at the southwest of the airport. The controller later advised the crew to make an ILS approach to Runway 20, but the crew elected to choose Runway 02, the same runway from the opposite direction, after considering the wet runway condition, downslope and tailwind. Captain Nolan knew that the approach to Runway 02 would be difficult so he took over control from his co-pilot.

As the approach commenced, the first officer asked the crew to prepare and announced to passengers that there would be turbulence. The weather was poor and the aircraft was shaking. During the approach, one of the cabin crew informed the pilots that the right side of the aircraft had been struck by lightning. Despite this, the aircraft continued the approach to Girona. Several preceding flights had diverted to Barcelona due to the stormy conditions.

=== First approach ===
At 23:18 local time, the aircraft was 16 nautical miles from Girona's VOR. The speedbrake was deployed and the aircraft reached the VOR at 23:22 local time while descending through 7,200 ft. After passing the VOR, the crew decided to follow the next step of the approach procedure. While turning back towards the VOR, the turbulence didn't dissipate. The aircraft kept shaking, hard enough to knock the approach chart out of its holder. The chart, which had been clipped by the holder onto Captain Nolan's yoke, had fallen to the cockpit floor. Captain Nolan eventually had to ask his first officer to read the approach chart to him.

Around 23:29 local time, the aircraft had levelled at 3,400 ft and the flaps had been set to 5 degree. The controller gave the crew on the updated weather report and the crew realized that the weather condition had deteriorated. Visibility had gone down from 5 km to 4 km and the thunderstorm had moved right above the airport. Captain Nolan then checked the remaining fuel on board and advised his co-pilot to divert to one of the alternate airports in case of a missed approach.

The crew eventually fully configured the aircraft for landing and completed the landing checklist. However, the controller reported that the wind direction had changed. The wind now favoured the opposite runway and was blowing at 12 knots. She advised the crew to make an ILS approach to runway 20. Captain Nolan had acquired visual contact with the runway, but later decided to conduct a missed approach instead due to the aircraft being misaligned with the runway. They notified the ATC and headed to the north of the airport for an approach to Runway 20. Upon request by the crew, the controller gave the weather information in Barcelona, where the weather condition had improved. They decided to continue their attempt to land at Girona.

=== Second approach ===
Following request from the crew for an approach to Runway 20, the controller cleared them and advised the crew regarding another wind change, this time the wind had increased to 15 knots. The crew agreed that they would divert the flight to Barcelona if they failed to land at their second attempt. The Flight Management Computer (FMC) warned the crew that the remaining fuel had depleted to an insufficient level and the first officer advised Captain Nolan on the situation. The aircraft began to capture the glidepath. Just before they managed to do so, Captain Nolan checked on the fuel again and realized that the fuel had decreased to 2,800 kg, approximately 200 kg short of the minimum fuel for a diversion to the alternate airport.

After capturing the glideslope, the crew gave confirmation between each other regarding their role during the landing. The First Officer would monitor the aircraft instruments while Captain Nolan would look out for external reference for Runway 20. The aircraft was configured again for landing and the crew received landing clearance from the controller. At 23:46 local time, the aircraft descended below cloud and became visual with the runway at around 500 feet (150 m) above ground level. The landing light was turned on and the ATC reported that the aircraft was in sight.

At 250 feet (76 m) above ground level, the crew disconnected the autopilot and the autothrottle. The First Officer noticed that the aircraft was above the ILS glidepath and warned Captain Nolan that they had deviated from the correct path. Captain Nolan momentarily pushed the nose down before he finally brought the yoke back up to the neutral position.

=== Crash landing ===
The crew was monitoring their instruments when the airfield lighting suddenly failed due to a power cut. When Captain Nolan glanced back to his window, he was stunned to find that the airport runway had disappeared from his vision. With few seconds left for a landing, at an altitude between 80 and 54 feet above ground level, the GPWS blared "SINK RATE", warning the crew on the excessive rate of descent. Shortly after the warning, the radio altimeter sounded "ten", indicating that there were only 10 ft left between the aircraft and the ground. Both thrust levers were immediately put to the idle position.

The aircraft touched down hard, first with its nose gear and then with the rest of the landing gears, at a speed of 141 knots. Forces up to 3G rocked the entire aircraft. It then bounced back to the air with a slight roll to the right and went down again in a full nose down input. It struck the runway with its nose landing gear again. The second impact was a lot more powerful than the last. As a result, the nose landing gear collapsed and the aircraft skidded through the runway.

Immediately after the second hard landing, all of the aircraft lighting went off. The emergency cabin light was activated. In the cockpit, the first officer shouted that the autobrake system was not working. Captain Nolan tried to stop the aircraft by applying brakes manually, but the aircraft kept rolling down the runway. Meanwhile, the controller, who earlier had lost sight of the aircraft during the electrical failure at the airport, realized that Flight 226A had rolled down the runway with flashes and sparks coming out from the left side of the aircraft.

The Boeing 757 then veered to the right and left the runway at high speed, approximately 1,000 metres (3,300 ft) from the second touchdown point. It then ran 343 metres (1,125 ft) across flat grassland beside the runway, before going diagonally over a substantial earth mound adjacent to the airport boundary, becoming semi-airborne as a result. Beyond the mound it hit a number of medium-sized trees and the right engine struck the boundary fence. The aircraft then passed through the fence, re-landed in a field and both main landing gears collapsed. It finally stopped after a 244-metre (801 ft) slide across the field, 1,900 metres (6,200 ft) from the second touchdown. During the crash, Captain Nolan was thrown from his seat, causing him to strike his head against the left windscreen, knocking him unconscious.

=== Post-crash ===
Damage was substantial: the fuselage was fractured in two places and the landing gear and both engines detached. Captain Nolan regained his consciousness shortly after the crash and the first officer immediately ordered an evacuation. Despite considerable damage to the cabin, the crew evacuated the aircraft efficiently. However, three of the eight emergency exits could not be opened and several escape slides did not inflate.

The tower controller, aware shortly after touchdown that something was amiss, tried to contact the crew of Flight 226A, but to no avail. She then pressed the button to activate the emergency alarm. To her surprise, the emergency bell did not ring. Fire crews were alerted by a dedicated telephone line and went to the threshold of runway 20 and drove along the runway looking for the aircraft, without success. They first went to the south of the runway, the last area where the aircraft had been sighted. After finding no signs of the aircraft, they went to the north of the runway to investigate the area. The search spread to the sides of the runway and the overshoot area. Meanwhile, majority of the passengers were still around the aircraft and many were drenched by the intense rain. One passenger later walked across the airfield to the terminal to seek help and told the staff the whereabouts of the crash site. The wreckage was eventually located 18 minutes after the accident. There was a further 14 minutes delay while the fire crews tried to gain access to the site. In all, transfer of passengers to the terminal building took an hour and ten minutes.

There were no immediate fatalities and the injuries were few: two serious and 42 minor injuries. However, one passenger, who had been admitted to the hospital with apparently minor injuries and discharged the following day, died five days later from unsuspected internal injuries.

Airport authorities were criticised after the accident, particularly for the fact it took rescue crews more than an hour to reach and evacuate the scene.

== Response ==
Thomson Holidays sent two aircraft to Girona to pick up the passengers who intended to go back home to Cardiff. Many of those who were unharmed in the crash decided to continue their journey to Girona and Barcelona for vacation. The company announced that they had prepared counsellors and staff to comfort the passengers. The Red Cross had also been put on standby. A private area had been set up in Cardiff for trauma counseling. Those who decided to go back to Wales would be provided with £100 for each passenger and a food parcel. They also stated that there would be an arrangement with locksmiths as multiple house keys and car keys of the passengers were still inside the wreckage. A team of 42 people were sent to Girona to provide support to the families at the hotels. A dedicated telephone line was also established by Thomson following the crash.

== Investigation ==
=== High rate of descent ===
The presence of stormy condition during the crash raised question on whether the storm had significantly affected the aircraft's performance, causing it to suffer a hard landing. The storm on that particular day of the crash was a part of a series of storms that had swept Spain for the past few days. At least five people in Catalonia had been killed by the storms, prompting the civil agency to issue a weather emergency throughout the region. The result of the analysis indicated that both turbulence and windshear had not significantly affected the performance of the aircraft during the approach. While the storm was not considered as one of the main causes of the crash, it did contribute to the crew's decision to conduct a missed approach, further decreasing the fuel of the aircraft and increasing the workload of the crew.

The investigation eventually attributed the causes of aircraft's high rate of descent to three main factors which were a destabilized approach, loss of external reference due to the airport's electrical failure, and the automatic callouts failure.

While the aircraft was following the glidepath, the autothrottle was disconnected and the crew set the power setting to 1.51 EPR, a little bit higher than the normal 1.2 EPR. The higher power setting led the aircraft to deviate from the glidepath as the aircraft flew a little higher than the correct glide angle. This deviation was noticed by the crew and they attempted to correct the glidepath by pushing the yoke to lower the nose, momentarily increasing the aircraft's rate of descent. The crew needed to monitor their instruments to know whether they had flown their aircraft to the correct glidepath.

While monitoring their instruments, a sudden electrical failure struck the airport, causing all lights to go out. The crew initially didn't realize that the airport's electricity had failed as their attention was directed to their instruments. By the time they shifted their attention back to the window, they were shocked to discover that the airport had disappeared from their view. The environment outside of their aircraft was pitch black and there was no reference for the crew to use for the landing. With no visual cues on the airport's runway, the standard operating procedure stated that the crew should have immediately executed a missed approach. At the time, however, their altitude was already close to the ground level and they were merely seconds away from landing. Given with the extremely limited amount of time to process and to consider the next course of action, the crew could not process quickly enough what had happened and became disoriented with the condition. Eventually, this led to the increase of the aircraft's rate of descent to 1,000 ft/min.

Due to the high rate of descent, the aircraft rapidly lost its altitude. At a height of 80ft from the ground, approximately four seconds before the crash, the GPWS warning sounded the "SINK RATE" warning, indicating a high rate of descent. The crew couldn't hear the automatic altimeter callouts which would have informed the crew on the remaining altitude left for the aircraft. The "SINK RATE" warning took priority over the altimeter callouts, causing it to override the automatic height warnings of 50, 40, 30 and 20 feet. When the GWPS had completed the "SINK RATE' warning, the radio altimeter finally sounded, blaring "10 feet," indicating that there was only 10 feet left between the aircraft and the ground. With such little altitude left, the crew couldn't do anything useful to decrease their rate of descent.

=== Hard landing and failure to stop ===
The aircraft entered a high rate of descent and the crew could not conduct the appropriate flaring due to their predicament. The aircraft touched down nose first at a speed of 141 knots and a descent rate of 840 feet per minute, causing forces up to 3G to hit the aircraft, higher than the maximum limit of 1.8 G. Following the first impact, both the aircraft's yoke and thrust levers were pushed forward, possibly involuntary due to the forward load that had been caused by the impact. The aircraft initially bounced back into the air, but due to the forward input on the aircraft's pitch it came back down to the runway with a nose down pitch.

The aircraft impacted the runway for the second time with its nose landing gear first. This time, the impact was much worse, exceeding the design limit for the aircraft's nose landing gear. The forces that struck the nose landing gear caused the gear to collapse to the back. The doghouse structure, which was attached to the landing gear, immediately rotated backwards following the collapse of the gear, crashing through the aircraft's main electrical component which was located directly behind it and severely damaging it. As a result, the aircraft suffered a complete electrical failure. Due to the failure, the flight recorders immediately stopped recording.

Even though the nose landing gear had collapsed to the back, the nose didn't continuously scrape the runway. The nose landing gear had collapsed in such a way that it still managed to support the nose of the aircraft from scraping the ground. However, the landing gear had also been lodged into the forward fuselage, damaging the flight electrical component and causing loss of battery supplies. It disabled multiple deceleration systems of the aircraft, including the autobrake, anti-skid and the spoilers. Despite the damage, analysis from the accident indicated that the aircraft should have been able to stop within the remaining runway distance.

Traces that had been left on the ground by the aircraft indicated that the aircraft had left the runway at a significantly high speed, probably between 142 and 191 knots. The findings suggested that the aircraft had been accelerating instead of decelerating during the 1,000 meters run. Investigators stated that the acceleration might have been caused by an increase in forward thrust of both engines.

The engine thrust increase had probably been caused by damage on the powerplant control unit of the aircraft's pulley system. The system had been damaged by the dislodged doghouse as the doghouse severed the B cable. The A cable, meanwhile, remained intact. The severed B cable caused tension to be released from the cable and produced tension on the A cable. The resulting tension rotated the pulley in a direction that would have caused an increase in forward thrust.

=== Final report ===
The accident was investigated by the Spanish Civil Aviation Accident and Incident Investigation Commission (CIAIAC). In its final report, the CIAIAC's finding was:

It is considered that the most probable cause of the accident was the destabilisation of the approach below decision height with loss of external visual references and automatic height callouts immediately before landing, resulting in touchdown with excessive descent rate in a nose down attitude. The resulting displacement of the nose landing gear support structure caused disruption to aircraft systems that led to uncommanded forward thrust increase and other effects that severely aggravated the consequences of the initial event.

The following contributing factors were also determined:

- Impairment of the runway visual environment as a result of darkness and torrential rain and the extinguishing of runway lights immediately before landing.
- Suppression of some automatic height callouts by the GPWS "SINK RATE" audio caution.
- The effect of shock or mental incapacitation on the pilot flying at the failure of the runway lights which may have inhibited him from making a decision to go around.
- The absence of specific flight crew training in flight simulators to initiate a go-around when below landing decision height.
- Insufficient evaluation of the weather conditions, particularly the movement and severity of the storm affecting the destination airport.

The CIAIAC issued 10 recommendations to multiple parties, including the FAA, EASA and Boeing. Several of the recommendations called for modifications and improvements regarding the design of aircraft components including an improved design of overhead lockers, better pilot seat harness and improved battery supplies. The FAA was asked to take measures regarding the possibility of uncommanded forward thrust. EASA was asked to make a specific go-around procedure below decision height as a mandatory course. Other recommendations were also issued to Girona Airport and the Spanish National Meteorology Institute (INM).

== Notes ==
1. The indicated weather report at the time was surface wind 350/6 kt, visibility 4 km, thunderstorm with heavy rain, cloud 3–4 octas at 1,500 feet, 1–2 octas cumulonimbus at 3,000 feet, 5–7 octas at 4,000 feet, temperature 20 °C/ dewpoint 20 °C, QNH 1010 mb, remarks recent rain.

== See also ==
- Accidents related to accidental forward thrust during landing:
  - S7 Airlines Flight 778
  - TAM Flight 3054

== Sources ==
- Official Spanish report: Technical Report A-054/1999 (in English) (Archive)
- Official Spanish report: Appendix A: Photographs, figures and graphs (in English) (Archive)
- Official Spanish report: Appendix B: Meteorological Radar Images (in English) (Archive)
- Official Spanish report: Appendix C: Flight Simulator Evaluation (in English) (Archive)
- Report in Spanish (Report file)
- Air Accidents Investigation Branch
  - AAIB preliminary findings
  - "AAIB Bulletin No: S1/2000 Ref: EW/A99/9/2 Category: 1.1." (Archive)
