= Comisión de Investigación de Accidentes Ferroviarios =

Agency of the Spanish Government

The Comisión de Investigación de Accidentes Ferroviarios (CIAF) was, from 2007 until 15 July 2026, the agency of the Spanish Government which investigated rail accidents. It was a division of the Ministry of Public Works and Transport. Its head office was in Madrid. It was replaced by the Independent Authority for the Technical Investigation of Accidents and Incidents (Autoridad Independiente para la Investigación Técnica de Accidentes e Incidentes, AITAI), as a result of a 2024 directive, in July 2026.

== Investigated accidents ==
- 2010, March Arévalo train accident
- 2010, June Castelldefels train accident
- 2012 Mataró train accident
- 2013 Santiago de Compostela derailment
- 2026 Adamuz rail disaster

== See also ==
- Civil Aviation Accident and Incident Investigation Commission
- Standing Commission for Maritime Accident and Incident Investigations
