= Joaquín Abril Martorell =

Spanish politician (born 1928)

Joaquín Abril Martorell (Picassent, Spain, 1928) is a Spanish politician who currently belongs to the People's Party (PP), although he has been a member of several other parties in the past.

An aeronautic engineer, Abril joined the Union of the Democratic Centre (UCD) which formed the Spanish government from 1977 to 1982. He took part in its campaign in the 1979 General Election in Valencia Province, in which his brother Fernando Abril Martorell was re-elected as MP. After the UCD disbanded following the poor result in the 1982 General Election he joined the Democratic and Social Centre (CDS). At the 1986 General Election he was chosen to head the CDS list for Valencia province, though this proved controversial as the decision was made by the National Electoral Committee of the party but was opposed by the local branch. Despite this, he was elected to the national parliament. He was re-elected at the 1989 General Election but like the other 16 CDS Members of Parliament, lost his seat at the 1993 General Election. He then joined the PP and following the PP victory in the 1996 General Election he was appointed Secretary of State for Transport and Infrastructure serving until September 1998. He has two sons; Joaquin and Miguel.
