= Independent Authority for the Technical Investigation of Accidents and Incidents =

Spanish independent agency

Agency overview
- Formed: July 15, 2026; 3 months ago
- Preceding agencies: Civil Aviation Accident and Incident Investigation Commission; Standing Commission for Maritime Accident and Incident Investigations; Railway Accident Investigation Commission
- Headquarters: Madrid, Spain
- Agency executive: Gonzalo Julián Guillén Espejo-Saavedra, President

The Independent Administrative Authority for the Technical Investigation of Railway, Maritime and Civil Aviation Accidents and Incidents (Spanish: Autoridad Administrativa Independiente para la Investigación Técnica de Accidentes e Incidentes ferroviarios, marítimos y de aviación civil, AITAT) is an Spanish independent agency whose objective is to improve safety through the prevention and, where appropriate, technical investigation of accidents and incidents in order to determine their causes and establish the appropriate corrective measures.

As an independent authority, it is governed by the law that created it, its organic statute and, subsidiarily, by those other rules of the legal system that may affect it and that are compatible with its nature and autonomy. For organizational and budgetary purposes, it is linked to the Ministry of Transport and Sustainable Mobility, a department that acts as a liaison between the government and the authority.

The authority is made up of a council, made up of a president and six councilors, all of whom are appointed by the king, on the proposal of the government and with the necessary agreement of the absolute majority of the Congress of Deputies. Likewise, all have a six-year term, without the possibility of reelection.

== History ==
=== Background ===
The technical investigation of accidents and incidents involving different means of transport has always been the responsibility of the government department responsible for transport policy, mainly the Ministry of Public Works—now called the Ministry of Transport—but also, as long as they existed, the Ministries of the Navy and the Air, through management bodies such as the Directorate-General for the Merchant Marine, the Directorate-General for Railways, or the Directorate-General for Civil Aviation.

The development of international regulations related to transport and their investigation led to the creation in 1974 of the first body dedicated to the investigation of accidents in Spain, the Civil Aviation Accident Commission, attached to the Undersecretariat of Civil Aviation of the Ministry of Air. In the same vein, in 1988 the Permanent Commission for the Investigation of Maritime Accidents was created, and in 2001, the Comisión de Investigación de Accidentes Ferroviarios (CIAF, Commission for the Investigation of Railway Accidents).

In the following years, the European regulations on the investigation of this type of accident were perfected and tightened, which forced the Spanish legislator to reform the aforementioned bodies to guarantee greater independence, although unsatisfactorily, since proceedings were opened against Spain for not guaranteeing independence or updating the way in which the facts were investigated.

=== Single, independent authority ===
Beginning in 2018, the above facts, as well as the pressure exerted by some associations of accident victims, led the Ministry of Public Works to formulate plans for the creation of a new body that would unify the three current commissions and that would have greater independence, limiting the dependence between the Ministry and this body as much as possible.

After numerous delays, taking advantage of the reform of the Railway Sector Law, at the end of 2022 the Spanish Parliament approved a mandate to the government to present the project within six months, which was consummated in March 2023. However, the dissolution of the legislative chambers due to the holding of early elections in July of that year meant that the project failed.

Following the formation of a new government in November 2023, the Council of Ministers sent the bill back to Parliament in February of the following year, and it was approved by the Congress of Deputies at the end of June and by the Senate in July.

This law established the new body under the category of independent administrative authority to guarantee its autonomy from the Government, reinforced the system of electing its members through a single, non-extendable and broad term (6 years), and forced the Legislative Branch to ratify appointments by absolute majority, giving Parliament the power of veto.

The Statute of the Authority was approved by the Council of Ministers on 24 February 2026, initiating the period for the appointment of a president and the implementation of the Governing Council. In July 2026, the Ministry of Transport appointed the Agency's first council.
