= María Teresa Villagrasa Pérez =

Spanish schoolteacher and politician

Teresa Villagrasa

Member of the Congress of Deputies for Huesca
- Incumbent
- Assumed office 22 April 2008
- Monarch: Juan Carlos I
- Preceded by: Víctor Morlán Gracia

Member of the Congress of Deputies for Huesca
- In office 2 April 2004 – 31 March 2008
- Monarch: Juan Carlos I
- Succeeded by: Marta Gastón Menal

Personal details
- Born: 1 November 1957 (age 68) Monzón, Huesca province, Spain
- Party: Spanish Socialist Workers' Party (PSOE)
- Children: two
- Occupation: schoolteacher

María Teresa Villagrasa Pérez (born 1 November 1957) is a Spanish schoolteacher and politician. She is currently a member of the Congress of Deputies for the Spanish Socialist Workers' Party (PSOE).

Villagrasa qualified as a primary school teacher and taught at a public primary school in her native Monzón (in the province of Huesca in Aragón, northern Spain), specializing in therapeutic pedagogy, hearing and language. She served on the Monzón municipal council from 1984 to 1999.

She was elected to the Congress of Deputies in the 2004 election for Huesca. In the 2008 election, she was number three on the PSOE list for Huesca, and was not elected. However, she returned to parliament only a few weeks later when Víctor Morlán, who had been head of the PSOE list in Huesca, resigned his seat to concentrate on his role as Secretary of State for Planning and Institutional Relations.
