= Railway Safety Agency =

- Agencia Estatal de Seguridad Ferroviaria

Agency overview
- Formed: April 1, 2015; 11 years ago
- Jurisdiction: Spain
- Headquarters: Madrid, Spain
- Employees: 114 (2024)
- Annual budget: € 16.5 million, 2026
- Agency executives: Rocío Báguena Rodríguez, President; Pedro M. Lekuona García, Director
- Parent agency: Ministry of Transport
- Website: www.seguridadferroviaria.es

The Railway Safety Agency (Spanish: Agencia Estatal de Seguridad Ferroviaria, AESF) is a Spanish agency within the Department of Transport. The AESF is the highest railway authority and responsible for the railway safety. It carries out safety management and supervision of all elements of the railway system: infrastructures, rolling stock, railway personnel, and railway operation. The agency is responsible for granting, suspending and revoking the licenses of railway companies.

== History ==
The origin of the AESF goes back to the State Agencies Law of 2006, which provided for the creation of a State Agency for Land Transport Safety, for the detection, analysis and evaluation of safety risks in land transport under central government jurisdiction, as well as for the exercise of inspection and supervision functions for the safety of the railway system, both in relation to infrastructure and railway operation, in the areas of central government jurisdiction.

This mandate was not fulfilled until 2014, when the Council of Ministers approved Royal Decree-Law 1/2014, of January 24, on infrastructure and transport reform and other economic measures, which changed the name of the agency to the State Railway Safety Agency because the European Commission demanded greater independence for the body responsible for railway safety.

Thus, finally, at the end of that year, the internal rules of the new agency were approved and it was officially established on April 1, 2015, succeeding the Directorate-General for Railways of the Ministry of Development in most of its functions regarding the railway system, except for those related to railway infrastructure, which were transferred to the public enterprise Adif.

In September 2015, the Cortes Generales definitively approved Law 38/2015, of September 29, on the railway sector, which updated the homonymous law of 2003 and clearly established the role of the agency within the railway system.

== Functions ==
As the responsible authority of the railway safety, the AESF is responsible for:

- Ensure security on state railroads.
- Monitor the functioning of the systems and check that they meet the requirements.
- Authorize the commissioning of railway vehicles.
- Issue, renew, modify, or revoke the safety certificates of railway companies and monitor them at a later date.
- Issue, renew, modify, or revoke the security authorizations of infrastructure managers, as well as supervise them later.
- Propose and develop the safety regulatory framework and monitor its compliance by railway system actors, as well as formulate proposals, guidelines and policy recommendations, including the technical specifications of the railway subsystems.
- Prepare reports on railway transport safety.
- Organize and manage the Special Railway Register.
- To grant, suspend, and revoke the homologation of the training centers and psychophysical reconnaissance centers of the railway personnel.
- To grant, suspend, and revoke the homologation of the maintenance centers, as well as the certification of the entities in charge of maintenance.
- Attend and participate in the working groups of the European Railway Agency and other national and international organizations related to the safety or interoperability of rail transport.
- To exercise the powers of the Ministry of Public Works in relation to the transport of dangerous goods by rail.
- To exercise the powers that correspond to the Ministry of Public Works in relation to the defense of the public railway domain and with the modification of the limit line of the building, without prejudice to the competences that correspond to the administrator of railway infrastructures.
- Exercise the sanctioning power in matters of railway safety.

== Organization ==
The agency is structured into three main governing bodies as follows:

1. Presidency with Direction, a subdirection of railway coordination and Subdirection of infrastructures and a Division of administration.
2. Governing council.
3. Control commission.

=== Presidency ===
The President is the institutional representative of the agency and its Governing Council. The President of the Agency is the head of the Secretary-General for Infrastructure. The President, since 23 March 2019 Julián López Milla.

=== Governing Council ===
The highest governing body of the agency is the Governing Council, which includes representatives of the Ministry of Development; the Ministry of Territorial Policy and Civil Service; Ministry of Finance; Ministry of Economy and Ministry of Industry, Trade and Tourism.

=== Director ===
The Director is the executive officer of the Agency and responsible for its ordinary management. The director is appointed by the Governing Council. The director of the agency is Pedro M. Lekuona García, since 2017.

The first directo of the agency was Carlos Díez Arroyo, who served from 2015 to 2017.

=== Budget ===
The 2023 budget was 16.5 million per the Secretary of State for Budgets and Expenditures (Secretaría de Estado de Presupuestos y Gastos).

== See also ==
- European Railway Agency
- Rail transport in Spain
- Rail transport in Europe
- History of rail transport in Spain
