= Spanish Aviation Safety Agency =

Coordinates: 40.451°N 3.693°W

- Agencia Estatal de Seguridad Aérea
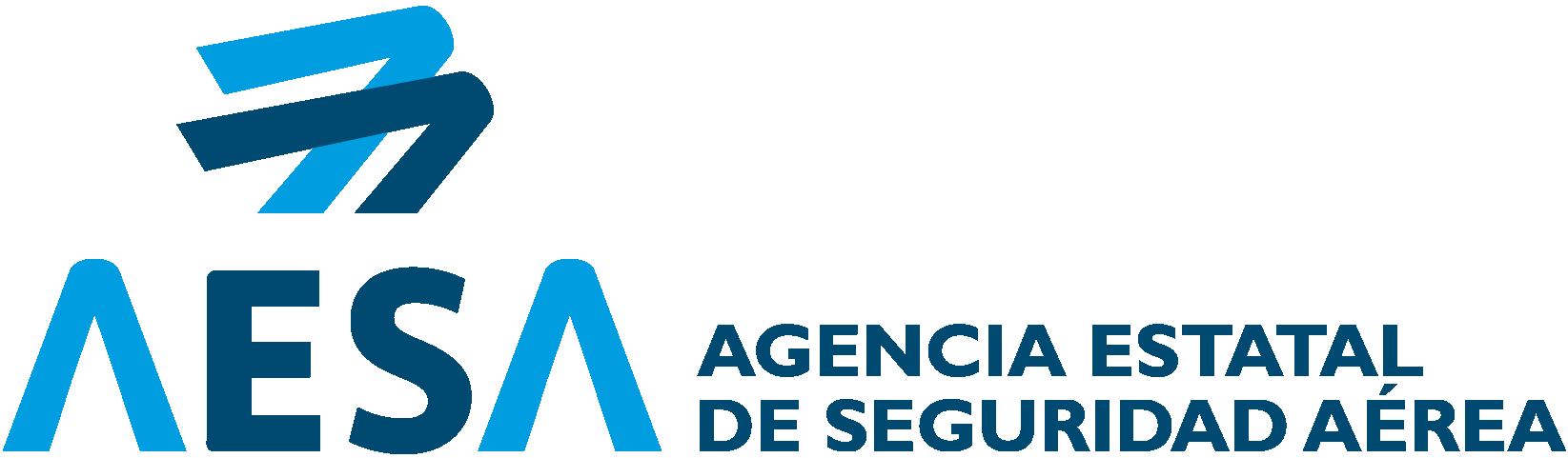

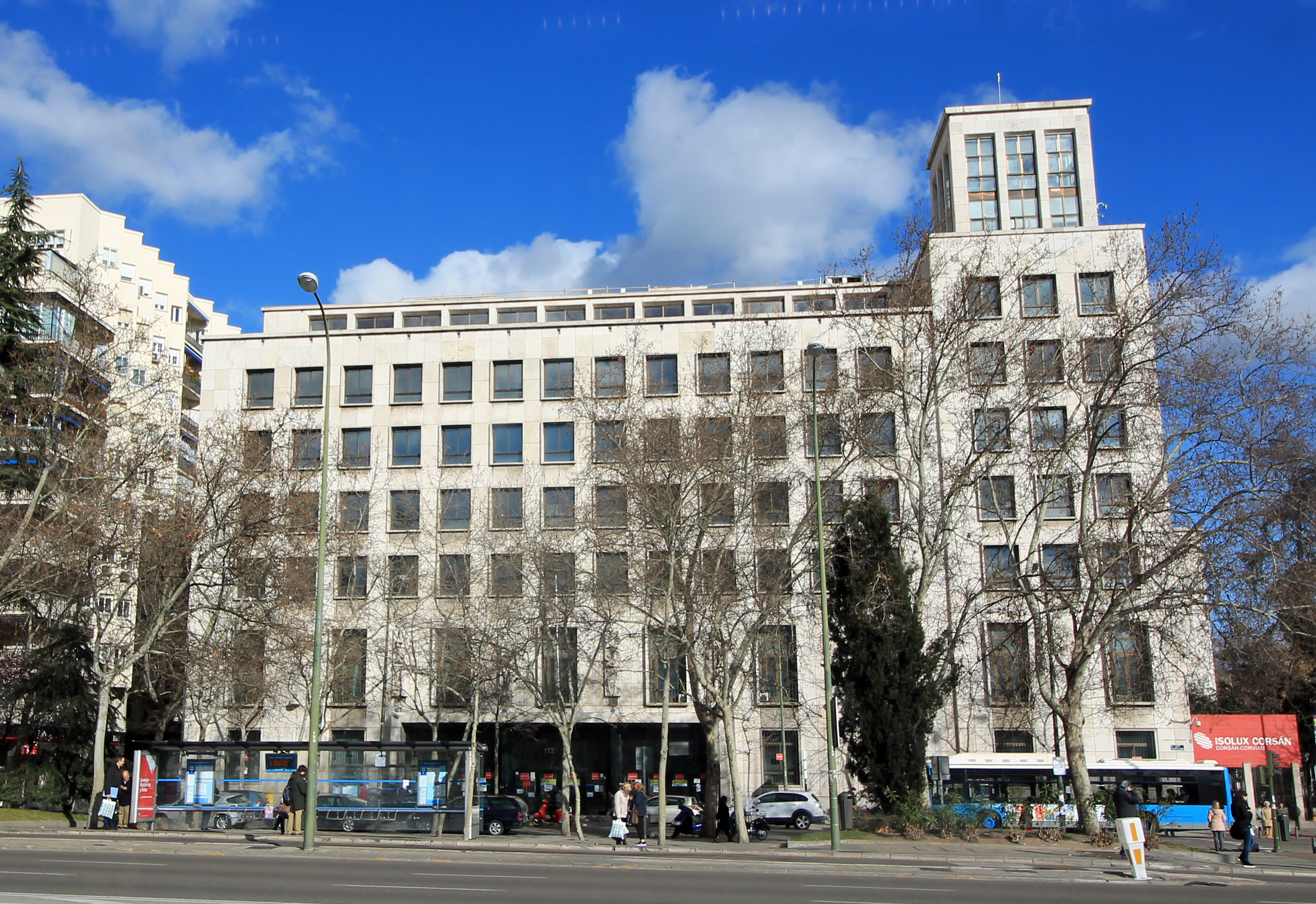
- AESA headquarters

Agency overview
- Formed: 8 February 2008; 18 years ago
- Jurisdiction: Spain
- Headquarters: Paseo de la Castellana 112 Madrid, Spain
- Employees: 420 (2020)
- Annual budget: € 83.7 million, 2023
- Agency executive: Montserrat Mestres Domènech, Director
- Parent agency: Ministry of Transport, Mobility and Urban Agenda
- Website: www.seguridadaerea.gob.es

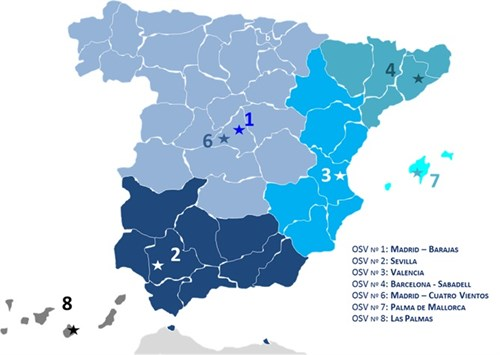
Agency Offices

The Spanish Aviation Safety Agency, also known by the acronym AESA (Spanish: Agencia Estatal de Seguridad Aérea), is the civil aviation authority for Spain.

The agency is based in Madrid, where it occupies offices on the Paseo de la Castellana.

== History ==
The agency was set up in 2008, taking over supervisory duties from the Dirección General de Aviación Civil (DGAC), a division of the Ministry of Transport, Mobility and Urban Agenda, the former Ministry of Public Works and Transport.

Its 2022 budget was €83.7 million.
