= Ministry of Development (Spain) =

Government ministry of Spain

Ministry of Transport and Sustainable Mobility
- Ministerio de Transportes y Movilidad Sostenible

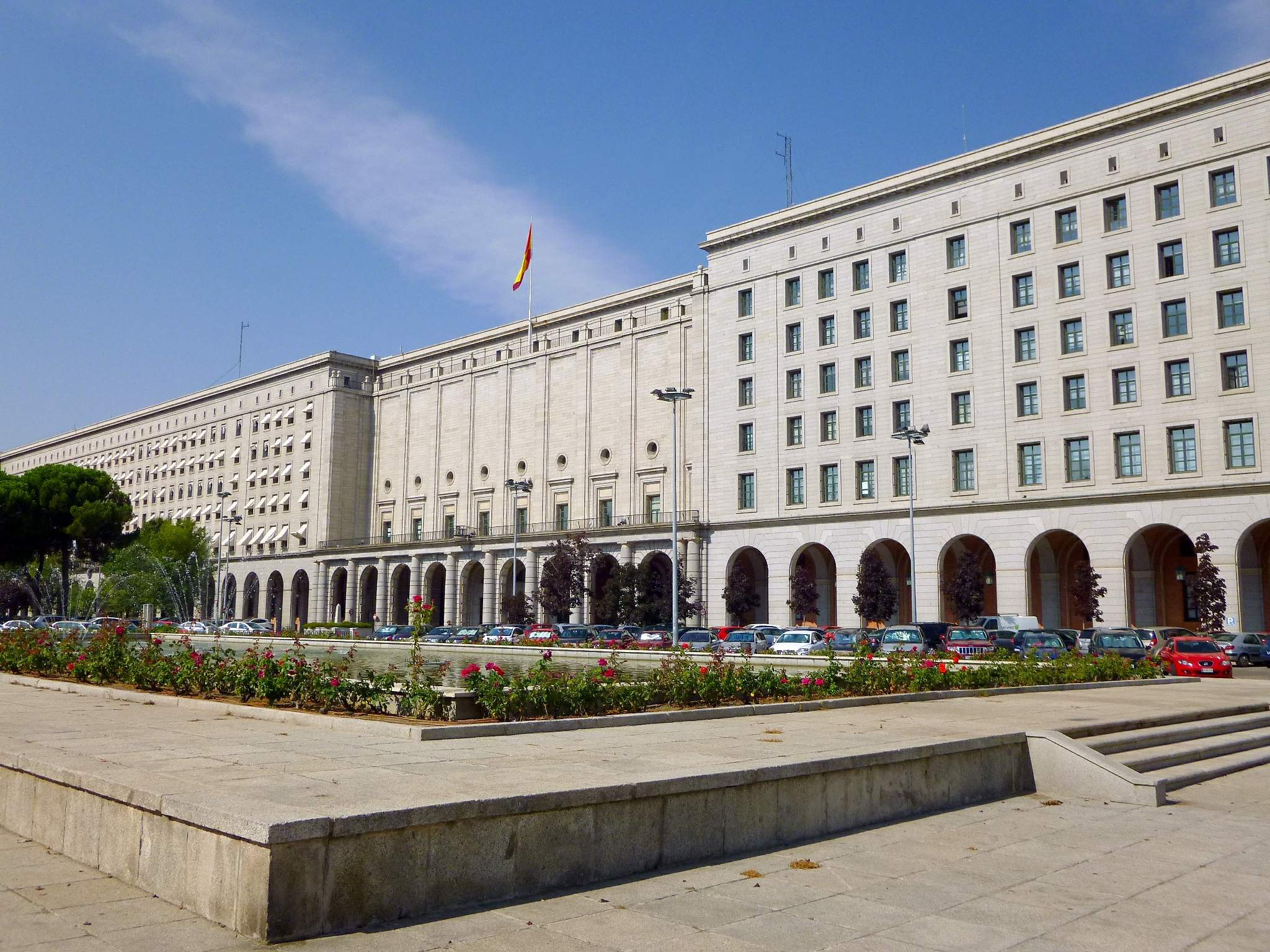
- Main headquarters

Agency overview
- Formed: 28 January 1847; 179 years ago (as Secretariat of State and of the Office of Trade, Public Instruction and Works)
- Preceding agencies: Ministry of the Interior; Ministry of the Navy
- Type: Ministry
- Jurisdiction: Government of Spain
- Headquarters: 67, Paseo de la Castellana, Madrid
- Employees: 4,867 (2024)
- Annual budget: € 11.5 billion, 2026
- Minister responsible: Carlos Cuerpo, Minister
- Agency executives: José Antonio Santano, Secretary of State; Rafael Guerra Posadas, Under-Secretary
- Website: www.mitma.gob.es

The Ministry of Transport and Sustainable Mobility, traditionally known as Ministry of Development and also as Ministry of Public Works, is the department of the Government of Spain responsible for designing and implementing the government policy on land, air and maritime transport infrastructure and the control, planning and regulation of transport, including the promotion of sustainable transport and active mobility. It is also responsible for postal services regulation and the direction of government's policies related to astronomy, geodesy, geophysics and cartography.

The department was founded in January 1847, succeeding the Ministry of the Interior (at that time called "Ministry of the Governance of the Kingdom") in the areas of public works, education, agriculture, and commerce. Later, it also assumed other responsibilities such as industry, fishing, hunting, statistics, and the supervision of banking and businesses, but from the 20th century onwards, its powers were gradually reduced in favor of other new ministries, stabilizing from the mid-20th century onwards around public works, transportation, and infrastructure.

The Ministry's headquarters are in the New Ministries government complex, in Madrid. Since 4 November 2026, Carlos Cuerpo has served as acting minister.

== History ==
=== Nineteenth century ===
The Ministry of Development, currently Ministry of Transport and Sustainable Mobility was created in 1847. In this date, the Secretariat of State and of the Office of the Governance of the Kingdom (today known as Ministry of the Interior) had a huge scope of competences and included areas of government policy that, over the years, would be splintered in the Ministries of Education, Culture, Agriculture, Development, Health, Industry and Trade.

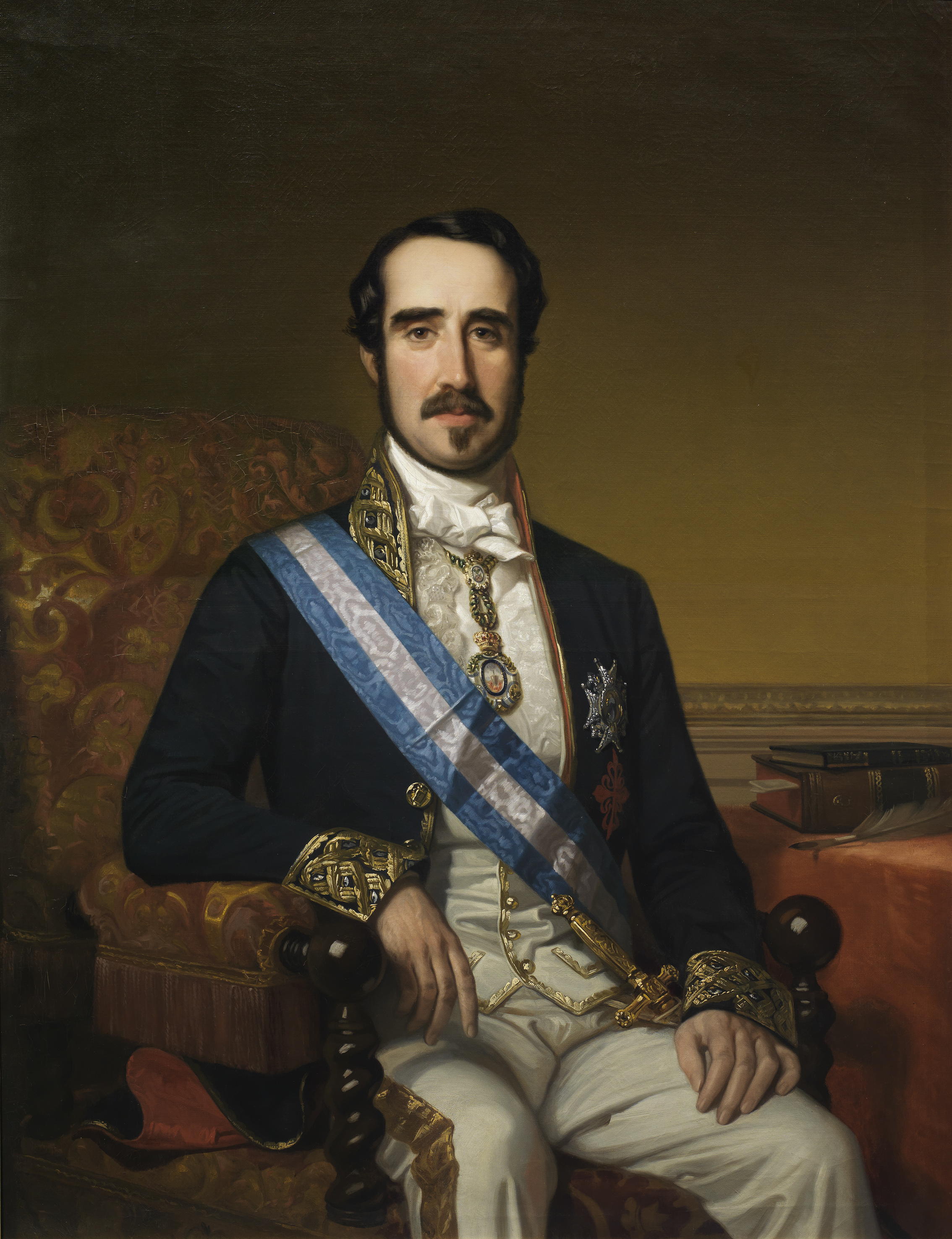
The Marquess of Molins served as the first development minister in 1847

Thus, by virtue of Royal Decree of 28 January 1847, a new government department called "Secretariat of State and of the Office of Trade, Public Instruction and Works" was established, assuming the areas of public works, public instruction and agriculture from the Ministry of the Interior, and those related to trade from the Ministry of the Navy. This new department was created not only to alleviate the burden of the heterogeneous areas of the Ministry of the Interior, but also due to the need to promote the country's economic development, an objective that was understood could not be achieved by a secretariat with so many responsibilities.

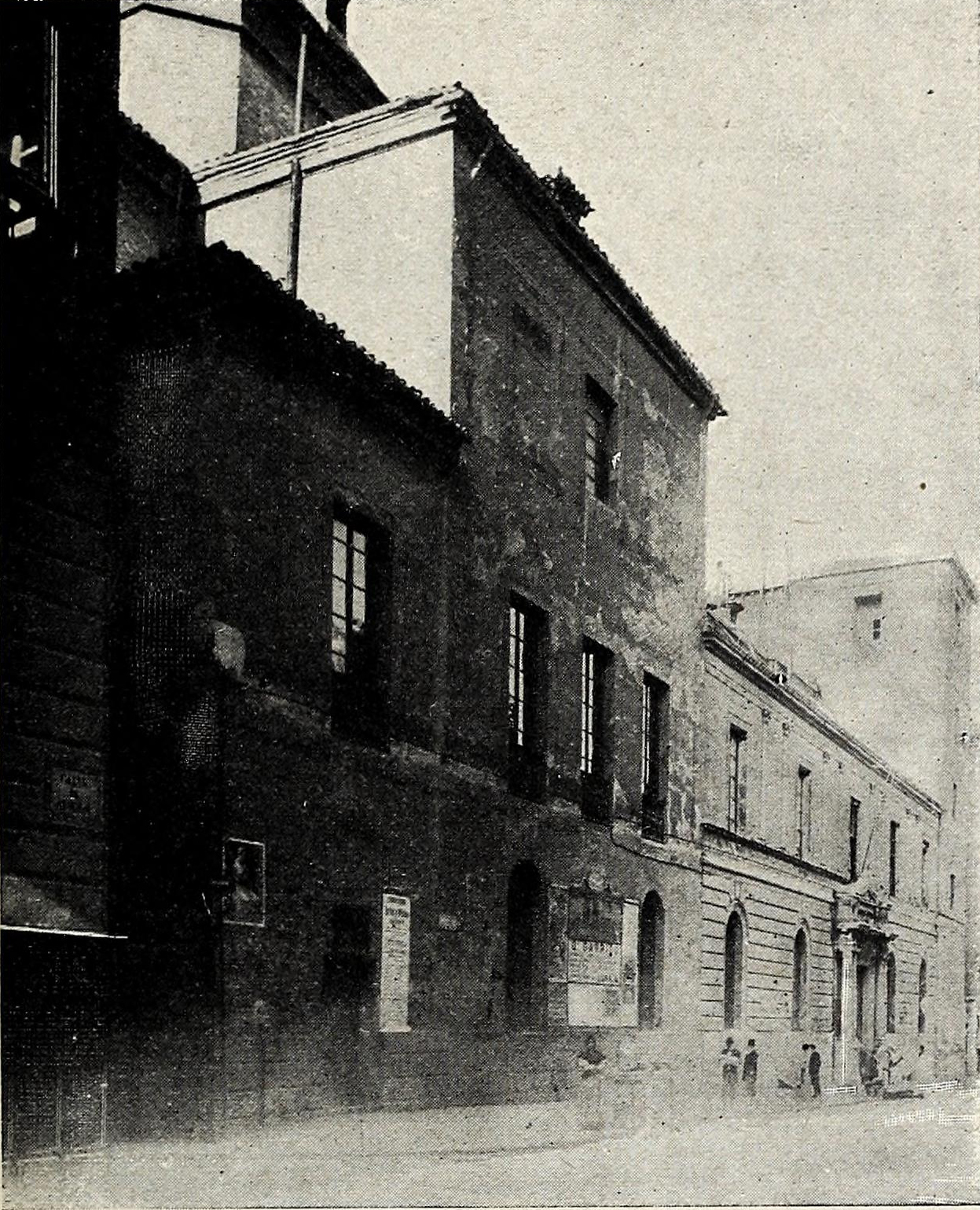
Main facade of the Convent of the Calced Trinitarians in 1897

The Convent of the Calced Trinitarians, which at that time housed the Trinity Museum, (Note: The Trinity Museum (Museo de la Trinidad) was a national museum that existed in Madrid from 1837 to 1872, when it was merged into the Prado Museum.) was chosen as the first headquarters. The museum and the ministry coexisted for years, a situation that was criticized at the time because it often prevented the museum from displaying its works and ultimately led to the museum's closure in 1872.

The original structure consisted of three directorates-general, namely: Public Instruction, Public Works, and Agriculture and Trade, this last renamed as "Directorate-General for Agriculture, Industry and Trade" in late 1847 when the Ministry assumed the powers over manufacturing industry and livestock. In December thay year it also assumed the mining policy and, in 1849, the "Commission for the Geological Mapping of Madrid and the whole Kingdom" was founded, which over the years would evolve into the current Geological and Mining Institute of Spain (IGME).

In 1851, it officially acquired the name by which it is best known, Ministry of Development, and it was stripped of educational responsibilities in favor of the Ministry of Grace and Justice, on the grounds that, as the department in charge of ecclesiastical affairs, it was logical that both aspects should be unified. This would be reversed in 1855, on the recommendation of the Cortes. Briefly, in 1856, it managed the overseas affairs.

From 1870, the Ministry assumed the direction of the country's statistical services, through a Directorate-General for Statistics and the Geographic Institute, which from 1873 were merged into one, the Geographic and Statistical Institute.

Similar to what happened with its predecessor, half a century after its founding the Ministry of Development suffered its first major split, with the creation of the Ministry of Public Instruction and Fine Arts in 1900, based on the former's responsibilities related to education, statistics, science, fine arts, museums, archives and libraries, a project that had already been attempted in 1886, but which did not succeed. The department was renamed "Ministry of Agriculture, Industry, Trade and Public Works", although five years later it recovered the name "Development". At this time the Council on Public Works (COP) was founded, replacing the Advisory Board of Roads, Canals and Ports (1835) and the only one of the advisory bodies of this period that still survives.

=== Twentieth century ===
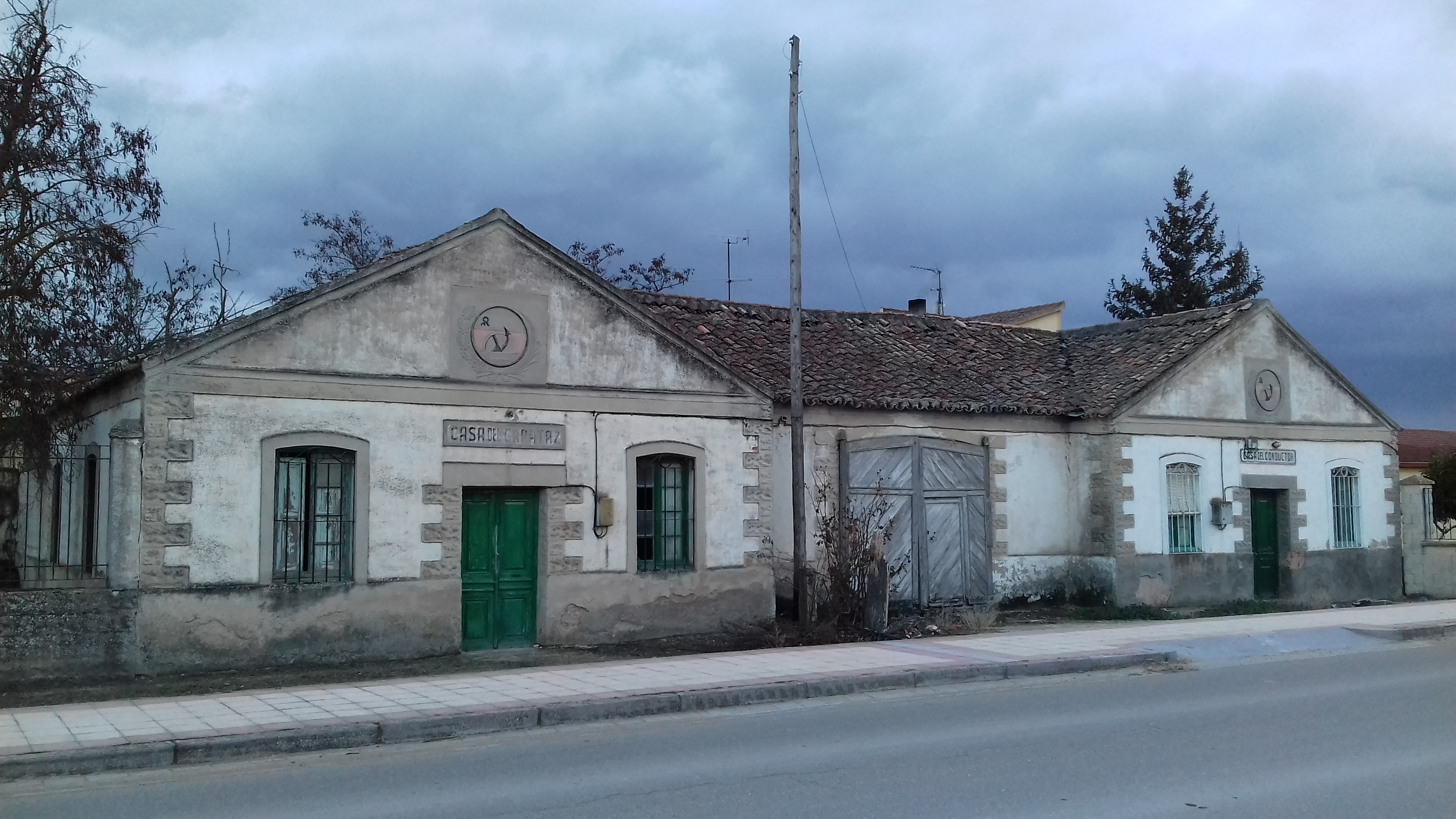
A "road worker's hut" in Quintanilla de Onésimo. Built from the reign of Charles III onwards, these huts housed the personnel responsible for maintaining the roads. Currently, most have been demolished or are abandoned.

Although the loss of the public education sector was significant, the bulk of the budget, as well as the department's work, was dedicated to public works projects, which continued to expand. So much so, that by the end of the 1920s this sector had grown from a single directorate-general to three: Public Works, Mines and Fuels, and Railways and Tramways. It also continued to incorporate new responsibilities, such as the management of tuna fishing using the almadraba technique in 1919.

During that 1920s, numerous changes occurred. First, the bodies and personnel of the abolished Ministry of Supply were integrated into the Ministry of Development, while it lost the labour affairs in favour of a new government department, the Ministry of Labour. Later, this same department stripped it of its trade and industrial powers. And, at the end of the decade, the Ministry of National Economy (today known as Ministry of Industry) was established, which, among other powers, assumed agricultural responsibilities from the Ministry of Development. For its part, the Ministry of Development assumed all fishing responsibilities from the Ministry of the Navy and those related to road transport regulations, as well as the relevant territorial bodies, from the Ministry of the Interior.

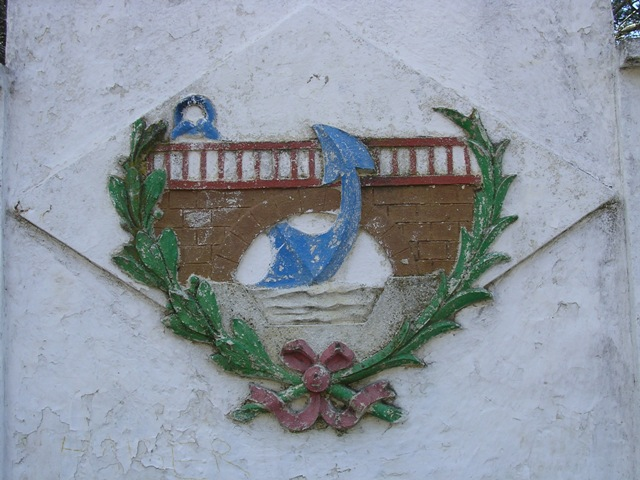
The old emblem of the Ministry of Public Works.

After the advent of the Second Republic, and by virtue of the Decree of 16 December 1931, the name of "Ministry of Public Works" was adopted. Through this decree, not only was the department renamed, but matters relating to mines, forests, and livestock were transferred to the Ministry of National Economy—now called the Ministry of Agriculture, Industry, and Commerce—. Likewise, the prominence of public works was reflected not only in the name, but also in the size of the area, in which new directorates-general were established for roads, ports and hydraulic works.

With some alterations due to the repeated creations and suppressions of the Ministry of Communications in the final stage of the republic, whose powers came and went from the Department of Public Works, it remained stable during the rest of the 20th century, including the dictatorship, undergoing minor name changes in lower bodies.

At the end of the century, Spain transitioned to a democracy and, in the second government of Adolfo Suárez, a new government department was established: the Ministry of Transport and Communications. This department assumed transport regulation, fisheries, postal services and telecommunications. For its part, this ministry, now called "Ministry of Public Works and Urban Planning", added to its jurisdiction the affairs of the defunct Ministry of Housing, as well as the rural development and environment branches of the Ministry of the Presidency. Thus, by the time the 1978 Constitution came into force, the Ministry covered the areas of public works, roads, water and hydraulic works, ports and coasts, housing, urban planning, land management, architecture and the environment.

Years later, in 1987, the Ministry of Public Works recovered some historical responsibilities, such as those of geodesy, geophysics, cartography and metrology, which were supervised by the National Geographic Institute, which was once again attached to the ministry.

High-speed lines in service in 2024. Since the 1990s, the ministry's main policy has been the implementation of high-speed railways throughout the country

Four years later, in April 1991, the Ministry of Transport, Tourism and Communications, created in 1977, was abolished and its functions were integrated into Public Works, with the exception of tourism policy, which was transferred to the Ministry of Industry. During these years, the most important policy developed by the ministry to date was initiated: the creation of a high-speed rail network, estimated to require an investment of around €70 billion from 1990 to 2025.

Also, in the 1990s, the focus began to shift to the environmental sector, which was strengthened by Royal Decree 199/1990, of February 16, by creating the General Secretariat for the Environment, which was structured through the directorates-general for Environmental Policy and for Environmental Planning and Coordination. The interest in this area did not end with this body; in 1993 the department was renamed as "Ministry of Public Works, Transport and Environment" and the Secretariat of State for Environment was created, and finally, in 1996 the Ministry of Environment was established.

It was precisely in this year, 1996, that the department regained the title of "Ministry of Development". In 2000, it lost its powers over communications—except for matters relating to postal mail—which passed to the Ministry of Science and Technology, through the Secretariat of State for Telecommunications and the Information Society.

=== Present ===
Between 2004 and 2012, several reforms in the Ministry favoured the establishment of an estable structure that lasted until the mid-2020s. Initially, housing responsibilities went to the Ministry of Housing, which was re-established in 2004 and had a General Secretariat for Housing; however, it was suppressed in 2010 and its powers returned to the Ministry of Development. At the same time, the Ministry's competences were organized through two general secretariats, one for transport regulation and other for transport infrastructure.

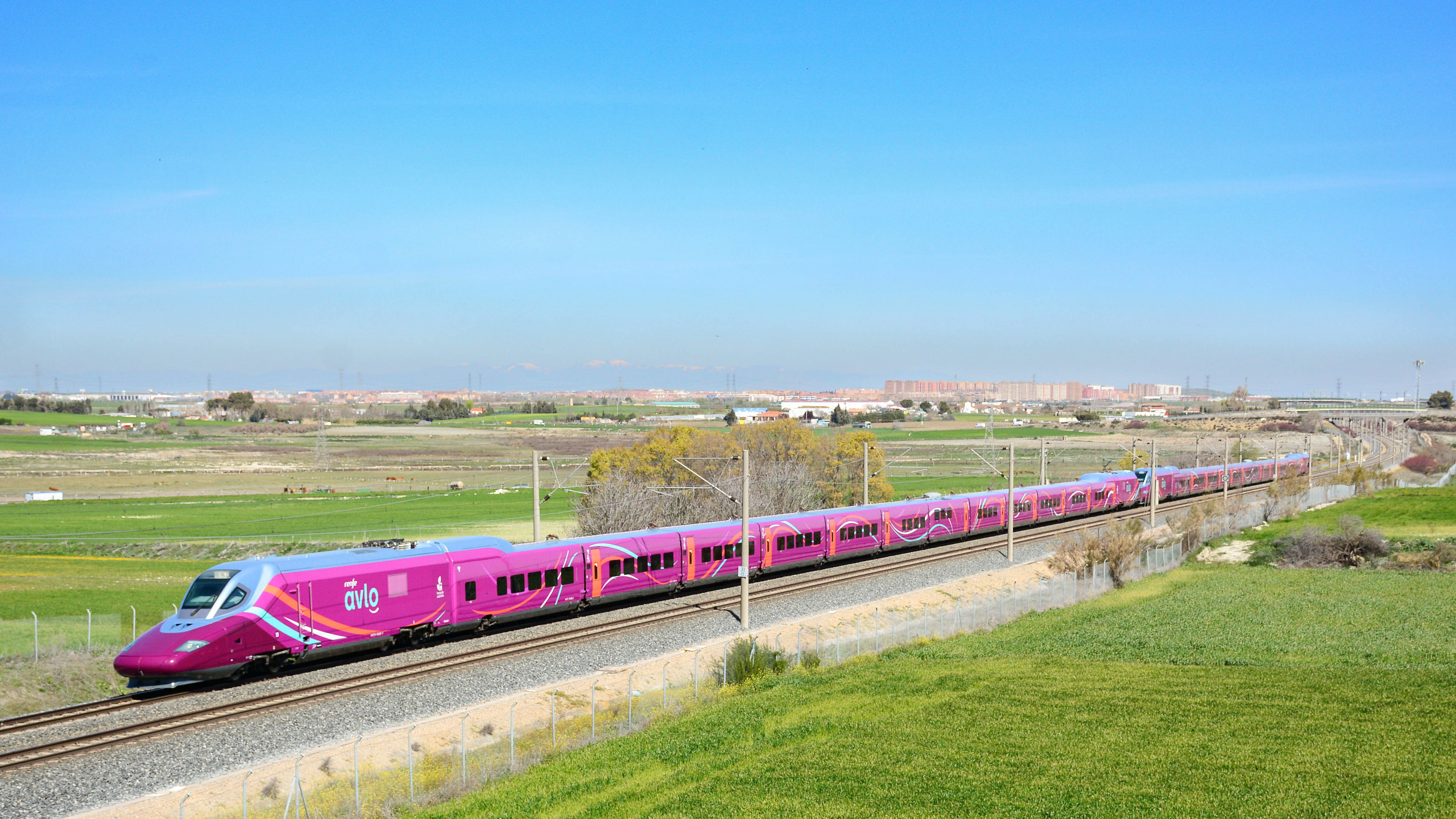
An Avlo train, Renfe's low-cost brand to compete in the rail passenger transport market.

Thus, by 2010, the Ministry had a State Secretariat that oversaw three general secretariats—Housing; Transport; and Infrastructure—, and new regulatory agencies were created for Aviation and Railway Safety. In addition, the rail transport market was liberalized, transforming some public enterprises to allow competition from private companies.

During the premiership of Pedro Sánchez, several changes were made in the Ministry. Firstly, the department was renamed once again as "Ministry of Transport, Mobility and Urban Agenda" with the aim of reorienting policies in the promotion of public works and transport, moving away from traditional terms alluding to construction and focusing more on the concepts of transport, transport infrastructure and mobility. Also, the aforementioned liberalization took place on 14 December 2020, when the rail passenger transport market was liberalized and, in June 2021, Renfe launched a new low-cost brand, Avlo, to compete with the new private operators.

In November 2023, the ministry changed its name once again, this time to "Ministry of Transport and Sustainable Mobility", after losing its housing responsibilities, which were transferred to the Ministry of Housing, which was reinstated for the third time. In December that year, new minister Óscar Puente profoundly reorganized the Ministry; as mentioned before, until then, transport infrastructure and transport regulation policies were managed separately—through the General Secretariat for Infrastructure for the former and the General Secretariat for Transport for the latter—but, since Royal Decree 1009/2023, of December 5, the powers were reorganized through two new general secretariats—General Secretariat for Land Transport and General Secretariat for Air and Maritime Transport—which unified the different specific types of transport with their respective planning and infrastructure policies. This reorganization was completed in March of the following year, with the creation of the General Secretariat for Sustainable Mobility, which grouped together the powers exercised by various bodies of the State Secretariat for Transport in this area.

Following the railway incidents in Spain in 2026—mainly 2026 Adamuz rail disaster and 2026 Urda train collision—, the position of Ombudsman for Victims of Public Transport Accidents was established—, with the rank of under-secretary, responsible for coordinating support for victims and their families, as well as strengthening the resources available for this task.

== Structure ==
Organizational chart of the Spanish Ministry of Transport, March 2024

The minister of transport and sustainable mobility, a member of the Council of Ministers, is the most senior official in the department, and is the official responsible for establishing the ministry's policy and organization.

To exercise its responsibilities, the minister is assisted by a secretary of state who coordinates everything related to transportation and infrastructure and an under-secretary, who support's the minister in everything related to managing the department, as well as coordinates the activities of the National Geographic Institute.

As of 2026, this is the organization of the Ministry:

Ministry Organization (2026)
Minister	Cabinet (Chief of Staff)
Minister	Deputy Directorate-General for International Relations
Secretary of State for Transport and Sustainable Mobility	Cabinet (Chief of Staff)
Secretary of State for Transport and Sustainable Mobility	General Secretariat for Land Transport
Secretary of State for Transport and Sustainable Mobility	Directorate-General for Roads
Secretary of State for Transport and Sustainable Mobility	Directorate-General for the Railway Sector
Secretary of State for Transport and Sustainable Mobility	Directorate-General for Road and Rail Transport
Secretary of State for Transport and Sustainable Mobility	Railway Safety Agency
Secretary of State for Transport and Sustainable Mobility	General Secretariat for Air and Maritime Transport
Secretary of State for Transport and Sustainable Mobility	Directorate-General for Civil Aviation
Secretary of State for Transport and Sustainable Mobility	Directorate-General for the Merchant Marine
Secretary of State for Transport and Sustainable Mobility	Maritime Safety and Rescue Society
Secretary of State for Transport and Sustainable Mobility	Spanish Aviation Safety Agency
Secretary of State for Transport and Sustainable Mobility	General Secretariat for Sustainable Mobility
Secretary of State for Transport and Sustainable Mobility	Directorate-General for Mobility Strategies
Secretary of State for Transport and Sustainable Mobility	Ports of the State
Secretary of State for Transport and Sustainable Mobility	Administrador de Infraestructuras Ferroviarias
Secretary of State for Transport and Sustainable Mobility	Renfe
Secretary of State for Transport and Sustainable Mobility	ENAIRE
Secretary of State for Transport and Sustainable Mobility	Centre for Public Works Studies and Experimentation
Under-Secretary	Technical Cabinet (Chief of Staff)
Under-Secretary	Technical General Secretariat
Under-Secretary	Directorate-General for Economic Programming and Budget
Under-Secretary	Directorate-General for Organization and Inspection
Under-Secretary	Directorate-General of the National Geographic Institute
Ombudsman for Victims of Public Transport Accidents	Office of the Ombudsman for Victims of Public Transport Accidents
Ombudsman for Victims of Public Transport Accidents	Technical Cabinet (Chief of Staff)
Ombudsman for Victims of Public Transport Accidents	General Secretariat
Ombudsman for Victims of Public Transport Accidents	Deputy Directorate-General for Assistance to Victims of Public Transport Accidents

The Independent Authority for the Technical Investigation of Accidents and Incidents (AITAT) is linked to the Government through this department.

== Headquarters ==
=== New Ministries ===
Nuevos Ministerios in 1967

The Ministry of Transport has its headquarters in the city of Madrid. Specifically, it is located in the Nuevos Ministerios government complex, designed by the architect Secundino Zuazo in the 1930s and inspired by the Royal Site of San Lorenzo de El Escorial.

The construction of this complex, designed to house the departments of Public Works; Governance; Agriculture, Industry and Trade; and the headquarters of the Directorate-General for Security, began in the Second Republic, in April 1933, as the express wish of the Minister of Public Works, Indalecio Prieto, and was not completed until 1942. The Ministry of Public Works finally moved into the complex in 1958, where it remains today.

In addition to this headquarters, where all the central services of the Ministry are housed, the department has other buildings that house its agencies and public enterprises, which have their own headquarters.

=== Former headquarters ===
The department's first headquarters were located in the now-demolished Convent of the Calced Trinitarians. This building had been acquired by the State during the Mendizábal confiscations and was used for the exhibition and conservation of a large part of the artistic heritage expropriated from religious orders, thus creating the Trinity Museum.

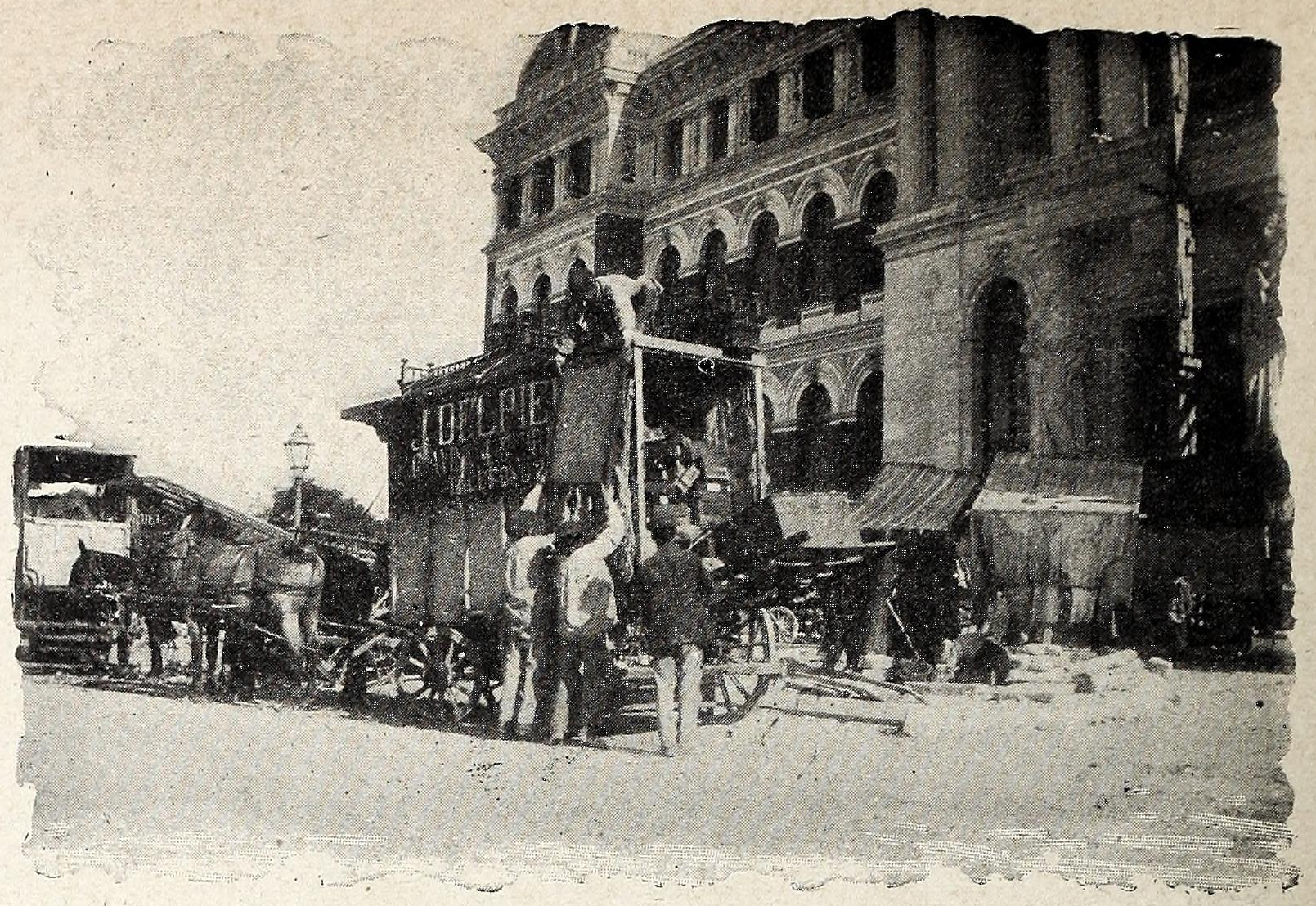
Relocation of the Ministry of Development to the Palacio de Fomento, 1897

With the creation of a new ministry, a location was sought that would not require increased public spending, and this convent was chosen, with both institutions sharing the space. The difficulties of this shared space were one of the reasons that led to the dissolution of the Trinity Museum and its eventual integration into the Prado Museum in 1872.

In addition to this use, it also housed the National Library and exhibitions of the Royal Academy of Fine Arts of San Fernando. Although there were plans to restore the building, which was in a state of disrepair, it was finally demolished in 1897 after the Ministry of Development moved to the Palacio de Fomento.

Since the completion of the Palacio de Fomento in 1897, this emblematic building served for decades as the headquarters of the Ministry of Public Works, although it shared space with other ministries such as the Ministry of Industry and Trade and the Ministry of Agriculture. Over time, this Madrid palace became too small, and the services were distributed throughout the city until the construction of the Nuevos Ministerios complex, leaving the Ministry of Agriculture as its sole occupant.

== Budget ==
In millions of euros (€)
1. Transport infrastructure 5,603.7 (48.9%)
2. Transport benefits 3,446.3 (30.1%)
3. Sustainable mobility 1,478.1 (12.9%)
4. Administration, management and general affairs 564.2 (4.92%)
5. Transport safety and regulation 365.3 (3.19%)

For fiscal year 2026, the Ministry of Transport and Sustainable Mobility has a consolidated budget of €11.46 billion. Of this amount, €11.3 billion are directly managed by the ministry's central services while €146.8 million are managed by its agencies.

The budget can be divided into five main areas:

1. Transport infraestructure (Programs 453A, 453B, 453C, 45FA, 45FB & 45FC), covering public investment in transport networks, including roads, railways and European corridors.
2. Transport benefits (441M, 441N, 441O & 441P), aimed at reducing transport costs for citizens and businesses.
3. Sustainable mobility (45AA, 45AC & 45FD), including policies such as low-emission zones, urban transport improvements and the ecological transition of mobility.
4. Administration, management and general affairs (451M, 451N, 45SC, 46AA, 46FB, 46QC, 467B, 467G & 495A), which finances the ministry's general administration services, research and technical support.
5. Transport safety and regulation (453M, 453N, 453O, 454M, 454O, 455M, 455O, 46AA & 497M), covering transport regulation policy, accidents investigation and general safety.

In addition, Programme 000X (“Internal Transfers and Disbursements”) is excluded from the analysis, as it consists of transfers between public sector entities and would otherwise lead to double counting and distort the overall budget.

=== Audit ===
The Ministry's accounts, as well as those of its agencies, are internally audited by the Office of the Comptroller General of the State (IGAE), through a Delegated Comptroller's Office within the department itself. Externally, the Court of Auditors is responsible for auditing expenditures. Likewise, the Congress of Deputies and Senate Committees on Transport and Sustainable Mobility exercise political control over the accounts.

== Bibliography ==
- Álvarez Lázaro, Pedro F. (director) (2001). Fundación BBVA (ed.). "Cien años de educación en España: en torno a la creación del Ministerio de Instrucción Pública y Bellas Artes" [One hundred years of education in Spain: around the creation of the Ministry of Public Instruction and Fine Arts]. Ministry of Education, Culture and Sport (in Spanish): 477–491. ISBN 84-369-3429-6.
