= Helimer 207 helicopter accident =

2010 aviation accident in Spain

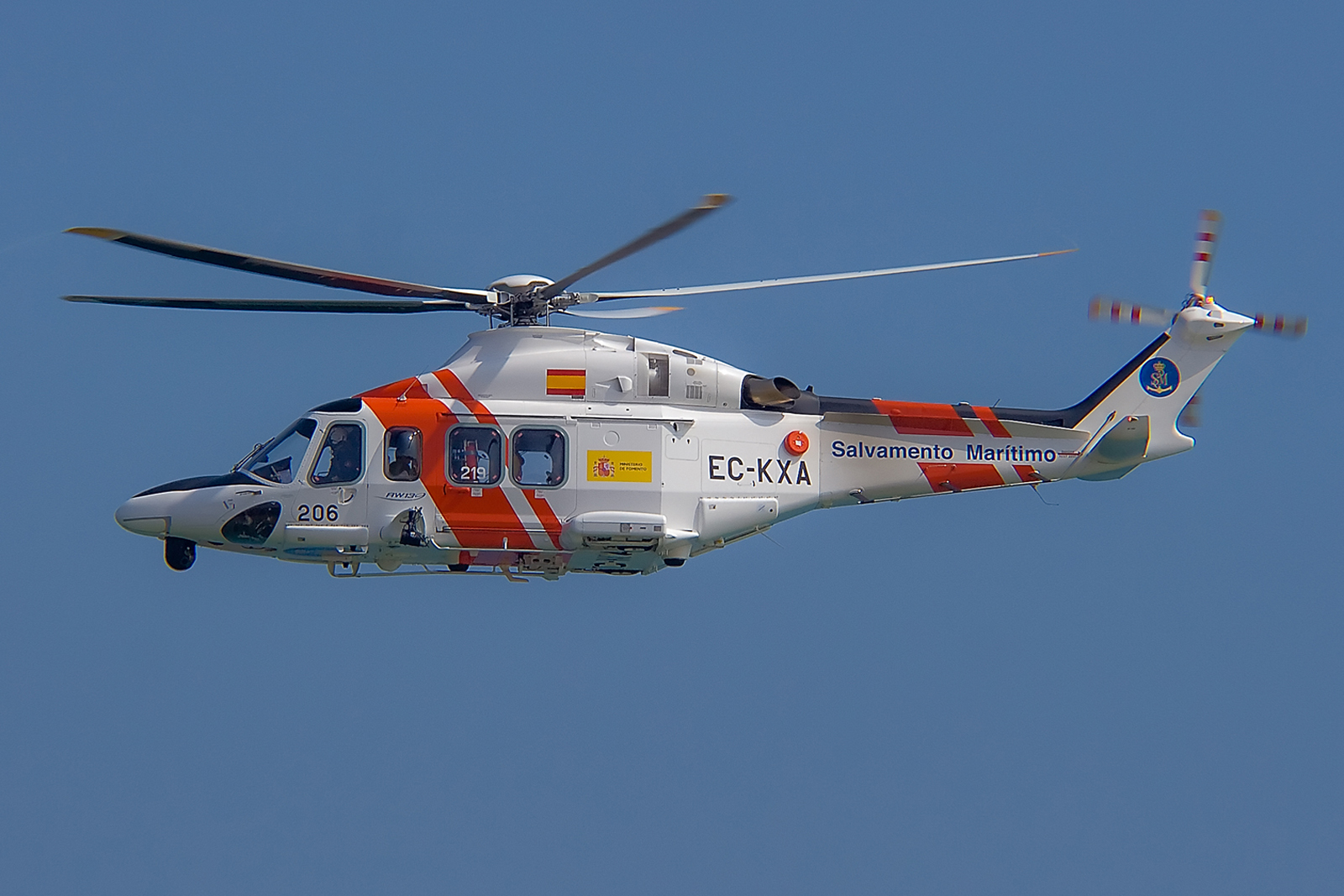
- An AW139 of SASEMAR (registration EC-KXA), similar to the crashed aircraft.

Occurrence
- Date: 21 January 2010
- Summary: Controlled flight into terrain
- Site: Mediterranean Sea, 4.5 nautical miles south of Almería Airport, Spain

Aircraft
- Aircraft type: AgustaWestland AW139SAR
- Operator: INAER
- Registration: EC-KYR
- Flight origin: Almería Airport, Spain
- Destination: Almería Airport, Spain
- Passengers: 0
- Crew: 4
- Fatalities: 3
- Survivors: 1

The Helimer 207 helicopter accident occurred at 20:16 (UTC+1) on 21 January 2010. The aircraft, an AgustaWestland AW139SAR, registered EC-KYR and with the call sign Helimer 207, departed from Almería Airport at 18:10 for a training mission consisting of three search and rescue exercises, with a planned duration of two and a half hours.

The accident occurred after completing the three exercises, during the return flight to the base. The helicopter suddenly impacted the surface of the Mediterranean Sea, 4.5 nautical miles south of Almería Airport, without the crew reporting any anomalies to air traffic control.

The helicopter was owned by the Spanish Maritime Safety Agency (SASEMAR) and operated by the aviation company INAER. Three crew members perished in the accident: the pilot, José López Alcalá; the copilot, Kevin Holmes; and the rescuer, Íñigo Vallejo García. The hoist operator, Alberto Elvira Vallejo, survived. This aviation accident was the most severe and the first with fatalities since SASEMAR's establishment in 1992.

Following the accident, the Civil Aviation Accident and Incident Investigation Commission (CIAIAC) conducted a thorough investigation, publishing an interim report on 24 November 2010. This initial report could not determine the accident's causes.

== Aircraft ==
The crashed aircraft was an AgustaWestland AW139 in the SAR (Search and Rescue) variant. In 2006, the Spanish government selected this model to modernize the Spanish Maritime Safety Agency's helicopter fleet, gradually replacing the Sikorsky S-61N in service. Spain was the fifth country to acquire this model, after the United Arab Emirates, Oman, Ireland, and Estonia.

The aircraft was manufactured by the Italian-British aerospace company AgustaWestland at its facility in Samarate (Varese, Italy). It left the assembly line in March 2009, with manufacturer serial number 31228, initially receiving the test registration I Fatsa-RAIR.

In June 2009, it was transferred to SASEMAR, registered with the Directorate General of Civil Aviation as EC-KYR. From its entry into service until the accident, the airframe and its two Pratt & Whitney PT6C-67C engines had accumulated 384:35 flight hours. The helicopter had participated in 40 emergency operations, involving 457 people, directly rescuing seven.

At the time of the accident, the aircraft was operated by INAER, which handled 100% of SASEMAR's owned and chartered helicopter operations.

== Flight ==
Location of the helicopter crash site on the map of the province of Almería.

The Helimer 207 flight began on the afternoon of 21 January 2010. The helicopter crew was tasked with a search and rescue training mission. At 18:06 (UTC+1), the copilot contacted air traffic control to request takeoff clearance and report the mission to be conducted south of Almería Airport.

At 18:10, the helicopter took off from Almería Airport, heading toward Cape Gata, 26 nautical miles from the base, to begin the planned training. The training consisted of three parts:

- The first part focused on flight practice, involving an approach to a ship and performing a hover over a selected vessel. It was successfully completed after an initial failed attempt at 18:53, 30 miles from the base near Cape Gata. Three minutes later, the helicopter headed north, on a heading of 331°, to a location 9 miles from the base where the Salvamar Denébola was positioned for the second and third exercises.
- The second exercise involved a survivor hoisting practice from the deck of a vessel, in collaboration with the Salvamar Denébola. The rescuer was lowered via the helicopter's winch with a mannequin and then hoisted back. It began at 19:28 and ended at 19:42.
- The third and final exercise was a search and survivor hoisting mission from the water, with the Salvamar Denébola acting as a support vessel. This started at 19:54 and concluded when the rescuer was back on the helicopter at 20:13.

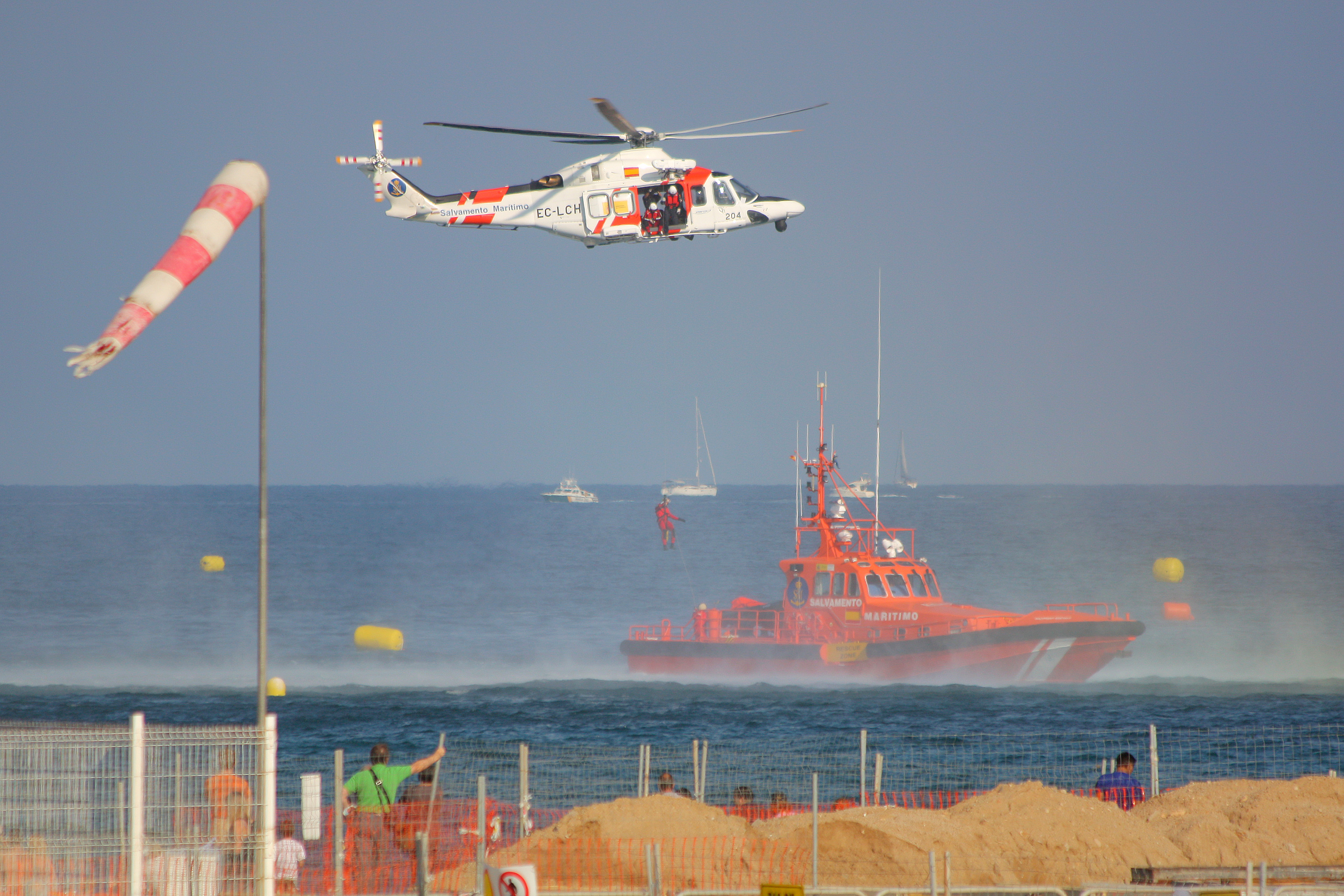
The Helimer 204 and the vessel Salvamar Mintaka simulating a survivor hoisting exercise.

After bidding farewell to the Salvamar, the crew set a heading of 082° to return to Almería Airport at a speed of 110 knots. At 20:16, the helicopter impacted the water surface.

== Search and rescue ==
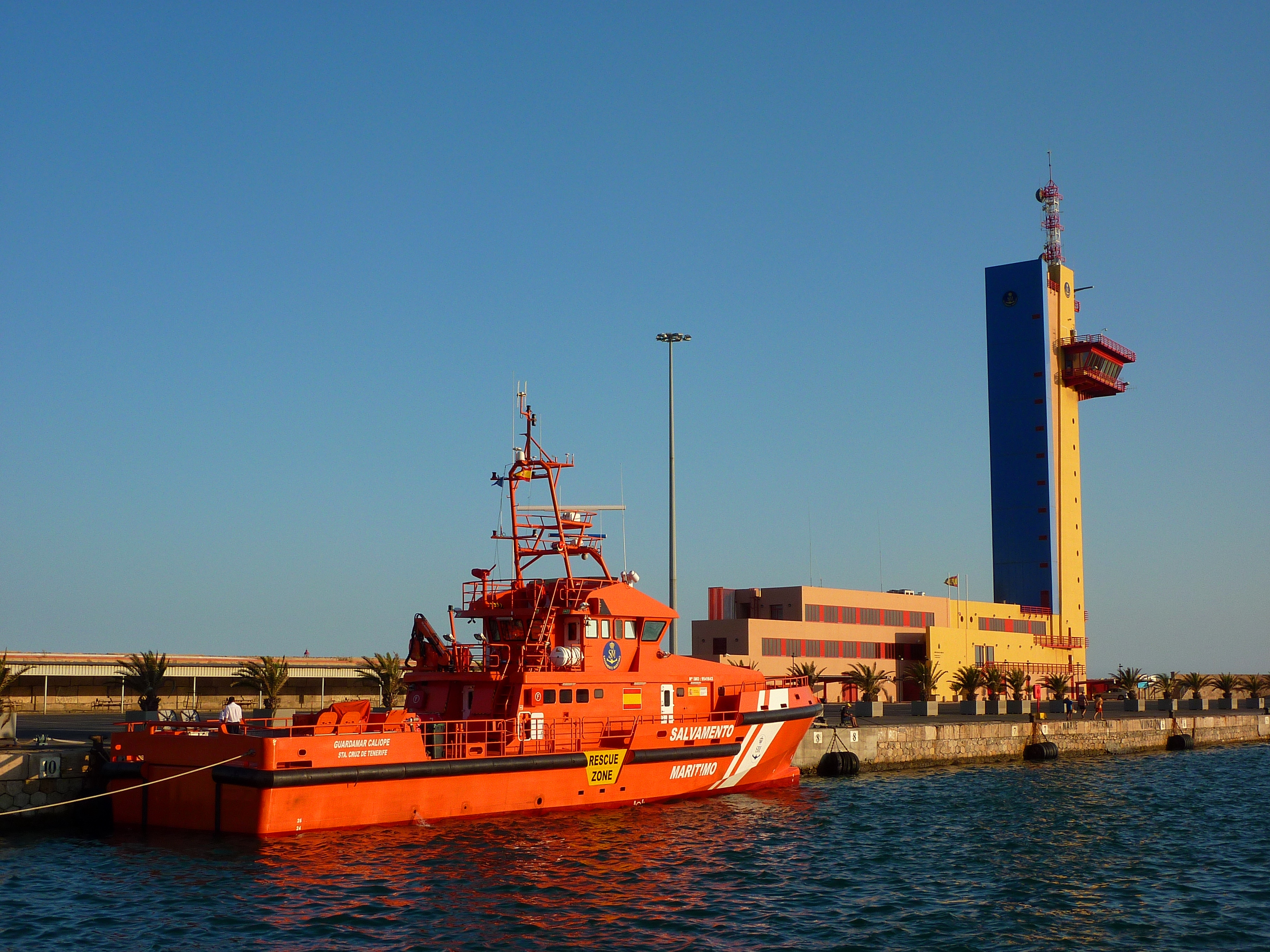
The Guardamar Calíope (G-40) in front of the Almería Rescue Coordination Centre.

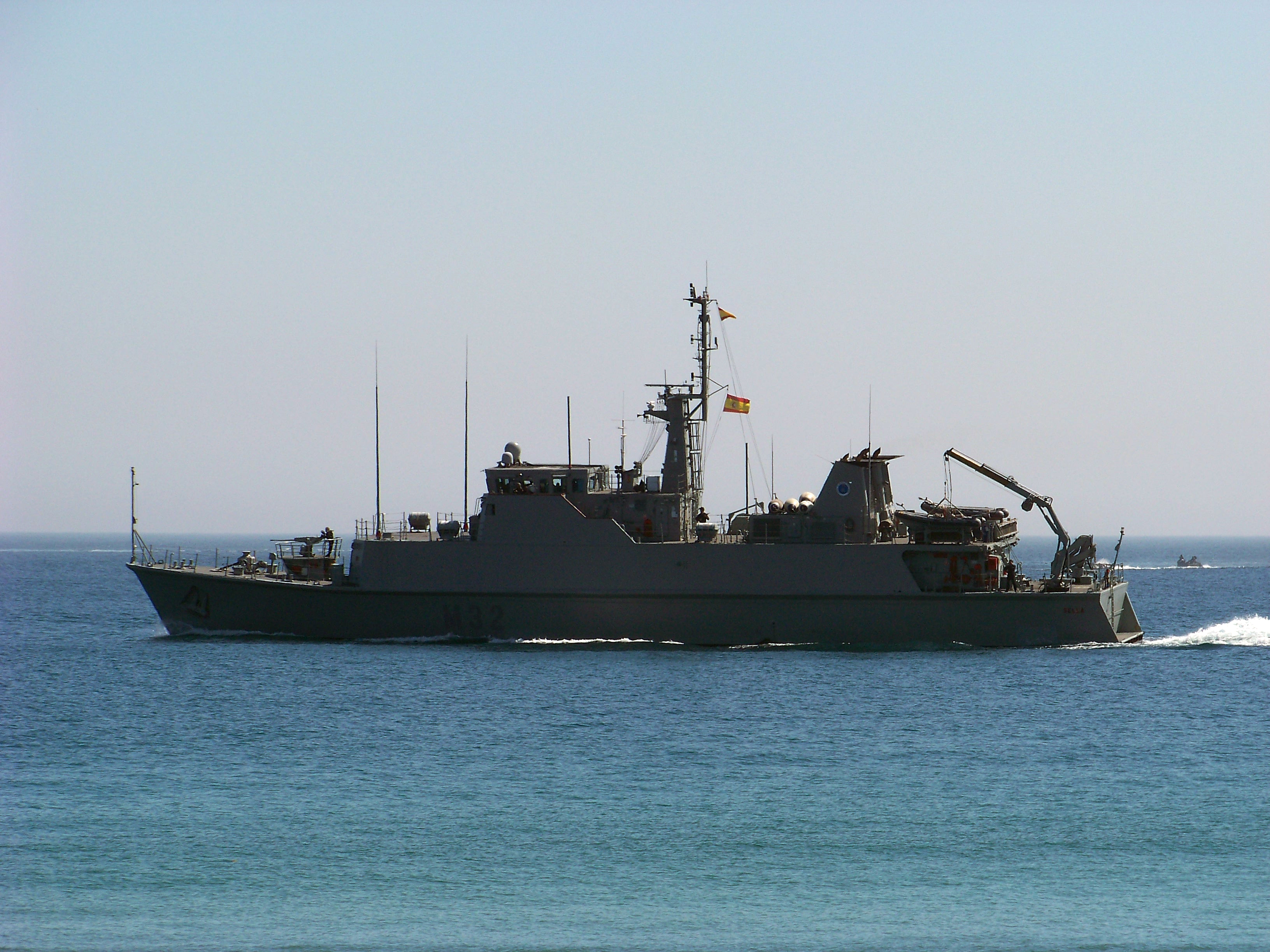
The Spanish Navy minesweeper Sella (M-32) assisted in searching for the AW139 wreckage on the seabed.

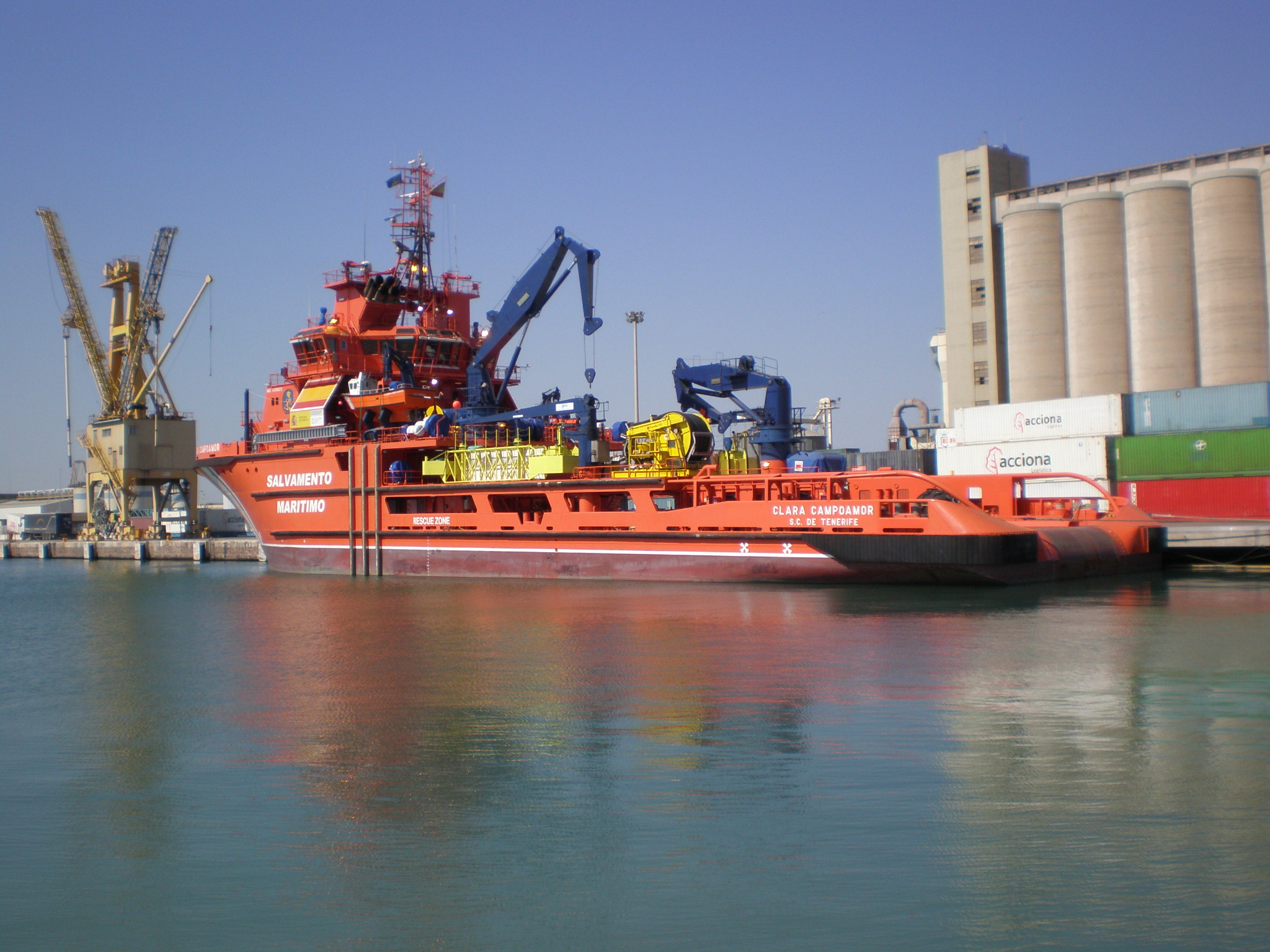
The multipurpose tug Clara Campoamor (BS-32) was used in locating and recovering the crew and fuselage.

Minutes after the accident, Almería Airport raised the alarm when the crew's approach confirmation was followed by a loss of the aircraft's radar signal. At 20:30 (UTC+1), air traffic control contacted the 112 emergency number after airport workers observed emergency flares. The Almería Rescue Coordination Centre then initiated a search operation by air and sea.

The first unit to reach the accident site was the Maritime Service of the Civil Guard patrol boat Río Jiloca, which rescued the hoist operator at 21:04. The other three crew members could not be found and were declared missing at that time. The patrol boat also confirmed the sinking of Helimer 207, finding debris floating 5 miles south of Almería Airport.

The hoist operator was taken in serious condition to Torrecárdenas University Hospital in Almería. Meanwhile, rescue units searched for the remaining crew on the surface. As only floating objects were found, an underwater search was planned using sonar, remotely operated submarines (ROVs), and specialized divers.

The Guardamar Calíope (G-40) was equipped with a side-scan sonar. A team from AgustaWestland, the helicopter's manufacturer, assisted in detecting the emergency locator transmitter signal from the black boxes. The Spanish Navy minesweeper Sella (M-32) and the Maritime Rescue multipurpose tug Clara Campoamor (BS-32) also joined the search. The minesweeper located the wreckage, overturned on the seabed at a depth of 90 meters.

After marking the wreck, Maritime Rescue's ROVs captured images of the helicopter, revealing that the three missing crew members were trapped inside the fuselage. Due to the depth, recovering the bodies was complex, with divers supported by ROVs. The first body recovered was that of the pilot, José Luis López Alcalá, followed by the copilot, Kevin Holmes. After a pause due to adverse weather, the third body, that of the rescuer, Íñigo Vallejo García, was recovered.

Subsequent efforts focused on recovering the helicopter wreckage to aid the CIAIAC investigation. The operation had two phases. In the first, the Clara Campoamor (BS-32) raised the fuselage to a depth of 23 meters. Divers then prepared the helicopter for final recovery. On 1 February, the fuselage was retrieved, along with the black boxes and control panels. Operations continued to recover additional debris to assist the CIAIAC.

== Investigation ==
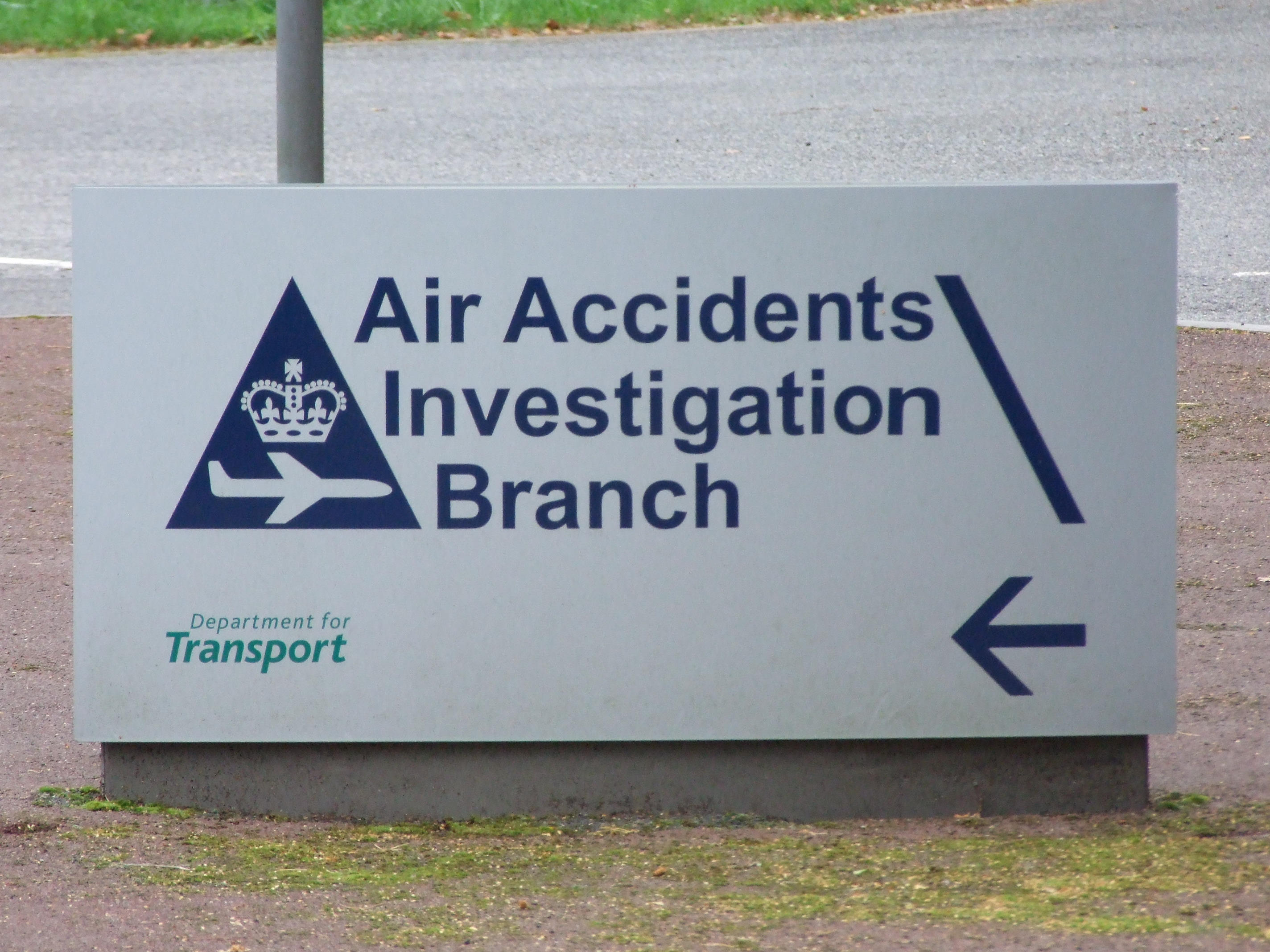
The black boxes were sent to the Air Accidents Investigation Branch.

Following the accident, the Civil Aviation Accident and Incident Investigation Commission (CIAIAC) launched a comprehensive investigation in collaboration with other aviation safety organizations and the aircraft's manufacturer. After the Clara Campoamor (BS-32) recovered the wreckage on 1 February, analysis began.

On 2 February 2010, the black boxes were sent to the Air Accidents Investigation Branch (AAIB) at Farnborough Airport, United Kingdom. After drying the devices, data and cockpit voice recordings were extracted starting 5 February. On 23 March, fuselage analysis began at Ocaña Airfield (Toledo), in collaboration with AgustaWestland.

=== CIAIAC interim report ===
The CIAIAC published an interim report on 24 November 2010, confirming that the helicopter impacted the sea frontally at high speed in a level flight attitude.

In general, a severe frontal impact at high speed in a level helicopter attitude was confirmed. The doors were ejected outward, indicating significant water pressure entering the helicopter from front to back and inside out. The main rotor damage was consistent with a sudden rotor stop while generating power. The rear fuselage and tail cone showed upward and rightward deformations due to high inertia loads from the impact and tail rotor.

— Interim CIAIAC report.

The interim report could not determine the accident's causes.

=== CIAIAC technical or final report ===
On 18 September 2012, the CIAIAC approved the technical report A-002/2010, outlining its findings on the accident's circumstances. The report concluded that the EC-KYR accident was a controlled flight into water due to a visual illusion experienced by the commander, misinterpretation of instruments, and inadequate monitoring of flight parameters by the copilot.

While mechanical failure was ruled out, the report criticized the operator (INAER, now Babcock MCS España), highlighting deficiencies in crew training, lack of checklists tailored to the helicopter model and SAR operations, and crew fatigue as contributing factors.

=== SAR and SITREP reports ===
Parallel to the CIAIAC investigation, SAR (Search and Rescue) and SITREP (Situation Report) reports were compiled regarding the search and rescue operation deployed after the accident. Despite demands from the Non-Governmental Experts Group of the Global Distress System (GENGSMS) and questions from Senator Arsenio Fernández de Mesa in the upper chamber, these reports were not made public.

Response to Mr. Arsenio Fernández de Mesa Díaz del Río (GP) regarding the availability of SAR and SITREP investigation reports, independent of the investigation into the causes of the Sasemar "Helimer 207" helicopter crash, to implement appropriate corrective measures to safeguard the lives of aircrew members:
The Spanish Maritime Safety Agency holds the file on the "Helimer 207" emergency, generated by the coordination of the search and rescue operation post-accident. The SITREP report is a summary extracted from the data in said file, used as a standardized notification of results obtained in various stages of the emergency. It is not used as the result of an investigation.

— Madrid, 16 April 2010 Secretary of State for Constitutional and Parliamentary Affairs.

== Crew ==
Three crew members died in the accident: the pilot, José Luis López Alcalá; the copilot, Kevin Holmes; and the rescuer, Íñigo Vallejo García. The hoist operator, Alberto Elvira Vallejo, survived.

Crew of Helimer 207 EC-KYR
Nationality	Fatalities	Injured	Uninjured	Total
ESP	2	1	-	3
NZL	1	-	-	1
Total	3	1	-	4

=== Pilot ===
José Luis López Alcalá, aged 40, was the pilot in command of the Maritime Rescue helicopter. He had over 4,000 flight hours of experience. A former Spanish Air Force commander, he served as a flight instructor at Armilla Air Base (Granada). He had been a Maritime Rescue pilot for nearly two years, serving at various bases before his final posting in Almería.

=== Copilot ===
Kevin Holmes, aged 43 and born in New Zealand, was the copilot of the Helimer 207 rescue helicopter. He had over 1,000 flight hours of experience.

=== Rescuer ===
Íñigo Vallejo García, aged 33, was the rescuer on the Helimer 207. He previously served three years in the Government of Andalusia's Emergency Group in a helicopter rescue unit. He joined Maritime Rescue in April 2007, initially at the Canary Islands base, then in Almería.

== Reactions following the accident ==
=== Tributes to the Helimer 207 crew ===
On 10 February 2010, a ceremony in Almería honored the four crew members with the Gold Medal for Merit in Civil Protection, with a red distinction. The awards were presented by the Minister of Development, José Blanco López, to the survivor, Alberto Elvira Vallejo, and the families of the deceased: José Luis López Alcalá, Kevin Holmes, and Íñigo Vallejo García.

In November 2010, during the Barcelona Boat Show, the "Silver Anchors" award was presented to the four crew members, collected by the survivor and the widows of the deceased.

=== Issues with other AW139s ===
Following the accident, professional groups highlighted design flaws in the AgustaWestland AW139. In 2008, the European Aviation Safety Agency (EASA) issued a directive for all AW139 operators to inspect their helicopters. The directive noted issues with the tail rotor, which, if undetected, could lead to structural failure, causing loss of control.

On 25 August 2009, a serious incident occurred with an AW139 operated by Gulf Helicopters, registered A7-GHC, when the tail rotor detached during takeoff preparations at Doha International Airport (Qatar). This incident, reported by specialized media, confirmed EASA's concerns.

On 4 September 2009, EASA issued another directive mandating thorough tail rotor inspections within the next 25 flight hours or 30 days, with subsequent inspections every 50 flight hours. Seven AW139s (serial numbers 31006, 31020, 31022, 31042, 31136, 31157, and 31248) with prior tail rotor incidents required initial inspections within five flight hours.

On 3 July 2010, nearly six months after the Helimer 207 accident, another AW139 crash occurred, involving a Sky Shuttle Helicopters aircraft on a commercial flight between Hong Kong and Macau. All occupants survived after the pilot reported an inoperative tail rotor, entered autorotation, and performed a controlled water impact.

On 25 August 2011, the global AW139 fleet faced further scrutiny after two consecutive accidents in China and Brazil on 17 and 19 August. EASA issued a directive requiring thorough inspections of tail rotor blades with over 600 flight hours or 1,500 cycles, mandating their replacement with lower-usage blades within fiveperial hours or 30 days. This grounded the fleet for inspections and blade replacements.

=== Complaints and criticisms ===
Complaints

On 24 March 2010, the General Confederation of Labour (CGT) filed a complaint with the Labour Inspection against INAER, alleging irregular working conditions, inadequate training, and the need to investigate the company's high accident rate. In October 2010, the Labour Inspection initiated a sanctioning procedure against INAER, identifying a lack of HEED training for pilots and all crew in a dunker simulator, as well as non-compliance with safety and health regulations.

In November 2010, the Official College of Commercial Aviation Pilots (COPAC) filed a complaint against INAER with the Spanish Aviation Safety and Security Agency (AESA), citing alleged failures in crew training obligations for occupational risk prevention.

Criticisms

Following the accident, media outlets reported criticisms against INAER, noting that it was not the only INAER helicopter to crash in recent years. The Spanish Airline Pilots' Union (SEPLA) reported that between 2006 and 2011, 20 crew members died in INAER helicopter accidents. SEPLA also criticized the lack of regulation for maritime rescue helicopter operations under European JAR-OPS 3 or Spanish legislation, and the AESA's lack of oversight in aviation safety.

The Non-Governmental Experts Group of the Global Distress System (GENGSMS) criticized Almería Airport's air traffic control for contacting the 112 emergency number instead of directly notifying the Almería Rescue Coordination Centre, failing to follow protocol and delaying response times. The GENGSMS also noted that Helimer 207 was not registered as a search and rescue unit with the Global Distress System of the International Maritime Organization, a mandatory requirement under the International Telecommunication Union.

== See also ==
- AgustaWestland AW139
- Maritime Safety and Rescue Society
