= Firefighting threat assessment matrix =

The firefighting threat assessment matrix is a risk assessment methodology used by German firefighters and aid organizations in order to identify the risks at the action scene. It has a form of a table with threats as columns and vulnerabilities as rows. The proposed here terms Threats and Vulnerabilities (not really defined in the origin) come from the field of risk management. The filled table helps the commander to prepare the strategy for handling the situation.

Since the table is just virtual, in the commander's head only, there is an underlying mnemonic scheme for naming the threats in German language (4A-1C-4E-Rule). For each vulnerability each likely threat is checked, not just the most likely/important one.

There are two versions of the Threat matrix, the classical and the extended. While the classical one is undisputed in the basic training of the German firemen, some experts recommend the extended version, as it allows for better description of the situation.

Threat Matrix

German version

== Vulnerabilities ==
- humans
- animals
- environment
- property
- rescuers
- equipment

== Scientific research ==
The Threat Matrix is used in some scientific projects as it allows for providing a human-computer interface in order to describe the emergency situation to the commanders.
