= Alice Eckenstein =

Swiss WW I activist

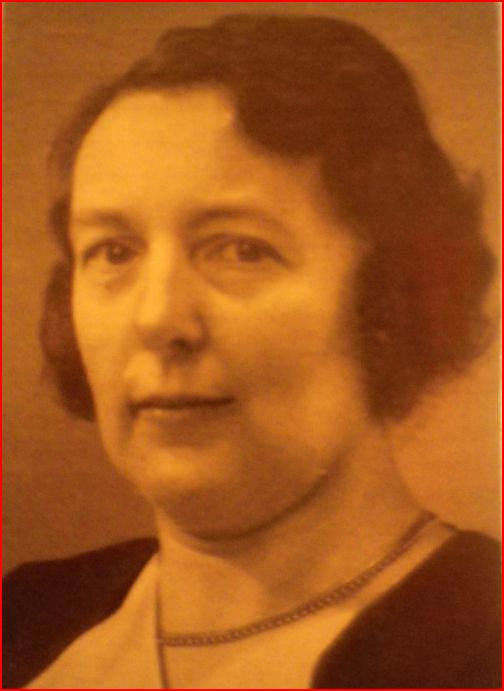
- Alice Eckenstein in 1935.
- Born: Alice Emilie Eckenstein; 31 January 1890; Basel, Switzerland
- Died: 12 May 1984 (aged 94); Basel, Switzerland

Alice Emilie Eckenstein (Basel, Switzerland 31 January 1890 – Riehen, Basel, Switzerland 12 May 1984) was a Swiss rescuer of children in need in occupied Belgium during World War I.

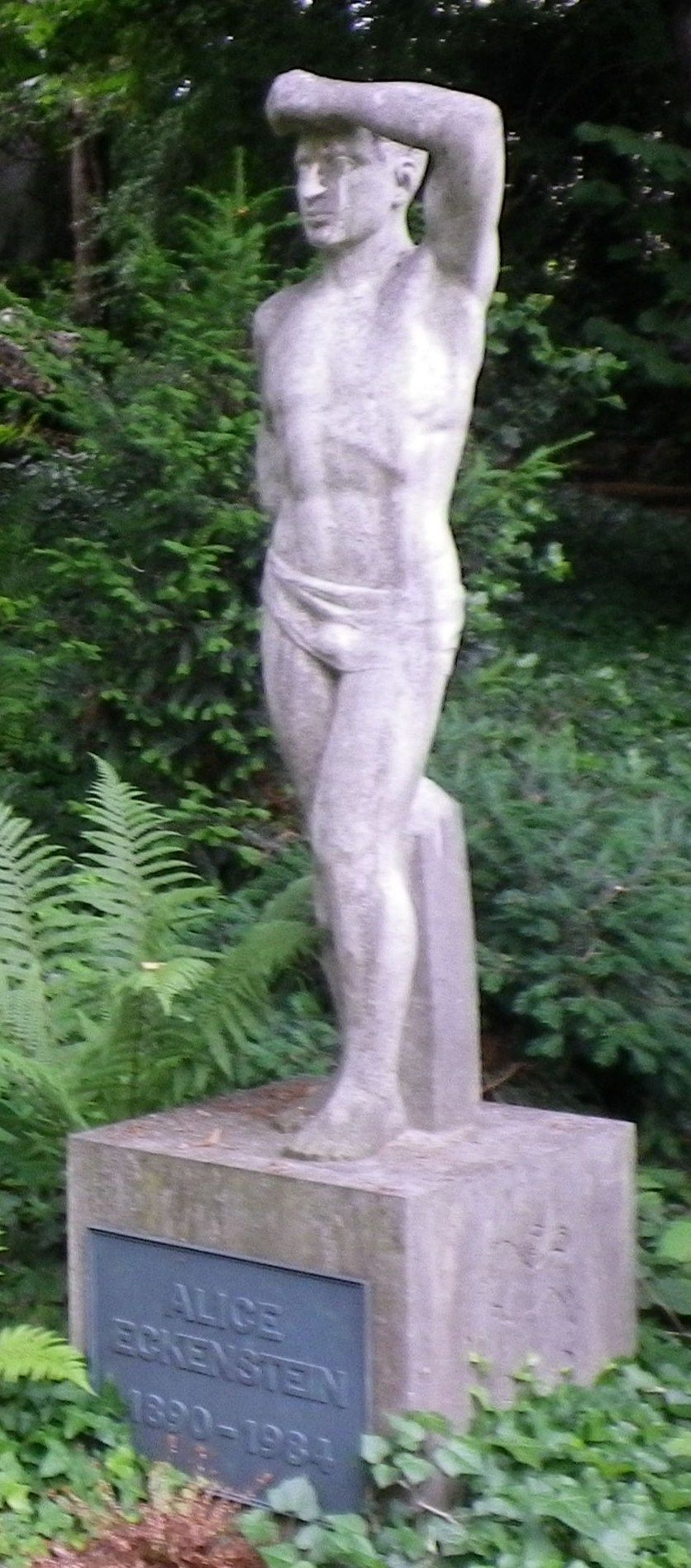
Tomb of Alice Eckenstein at the Wolfgottesacker cemetery in Basel

== Life ==
Eckenstein was the daughter of Arnold Eckenstein-Marfort, a merchant on Grellinger Street in Basel. At a young age, she desired to help others in need. After an appeal in the local press on 5 October 1914 by Mary Widmer-Curtat, she established under the patronage of the International Committee of the Red Cross (ICRC) an office in Basel with the intention to repatriate children in need from occupied Belgium. Among the numerous documents and letters that passed through her hands, those of anxious parents got her attention. During the summer campaign of 1914, multiple parents were surprised by the rapid advance of the Germans and were separated from their children, cut off by the frontline. Eckenstein, risking her life, succeeded in repatriating children from occupied Belgium to Switzerland, and then to the unoccupied zones of Belgium or France where they were reunited with their parents. Her ashes are buried at the Wolfgottesacker cemetery in Basel.
