= Maritime Safety and Rescue Society =

Spanish sea rescue service

- Sociedad de Salvamento y Seguridad Marítima
- SASEMAR emblem
- Abbreviation: SASEMAR
- Formation: 24 November 1992
- Location: C/ Fruela 3, 28011 Madrid, Spain
- Region served: Spain
- Parent organization: Ministry of Transport, Mobility and Urban Agenda
- Budget: € 213 million (2023)
- Staff: 1,534 (2023)
- Website: www.salvamentomaritimo.es

The Maritime Safety and Rescue Society (Spanish: Sociedad de Salvamento y Seguridad Marítima), also known as SASEMAR or Salvamento Marítimo, is a sea search and rescue agency that operates in Spain. It is the body in charge of maritime traffic control, safety and rescue operations, and protection of the maritime environment but lacks any law enforcement responsibilities. The agency runs 20 rescue coordination centers (RCC), employs a staff of 1,500, and operates a fleet of 19 vessels, 54 boats, 11 helicopters, and 4 airplanes.

== Equipment ==
=== Tugboats ===
María de Maeztu class

Name	Code	Year	Power (cv.)	Displ. (tons.)	Length (m.)	Area	Namesake
María Pita	BS-14	2007	5,500	60	39,7	Galicia (Rías Bajas)	María Pita
María Zambrano	BS-22	2007	5,500	60	39,7	Golfo de Cádiz	María Zambrano
María de Maeztu	BS-13	2008	5,500	60	39,7	Cornisa Cantábrica	María de Maeztu
Marta Mata	BS-33	2008	5,500	60	39,7	Baleares	Marta Mata
SAR Mastelero	BS-23	2010	5,500	60	39,7	Southern Mediterranean	Topmast
SAR Gavia	BS-15	2010	5,500	60	39,7	Galicia (Rías Altas)	Topsail
SAR Mesana	BS-34	2010	5,500	60	39,7	Levante	Mizzen mast

Luz de Mar class

Name	Code	Year	Power (cv.)	Displ. (tons.)	Length (m.)	Area	Namesake
Luz de Mar	BS-41	2005	10,300	128	56	Strait	
Miguel de Cervantes	BS-21	2005	10,300	128	56	Canarias	Miguel de Cervantes

Don Inda class

Name	Code	Year	Power (cv.)	Displ. (tons.)	Length (m.)	Area	Namesake
Don Inda	BS-11	2006	20,600	228	80	Atlantic	Indalecio Prieto
Clara Campoamor	BS-32	2007	20,600	228	80	Mediterranean	Clara Campoamor

=== Lifeboats ===
- Salvamar class
- Guardamar class

=== Aircraft ===
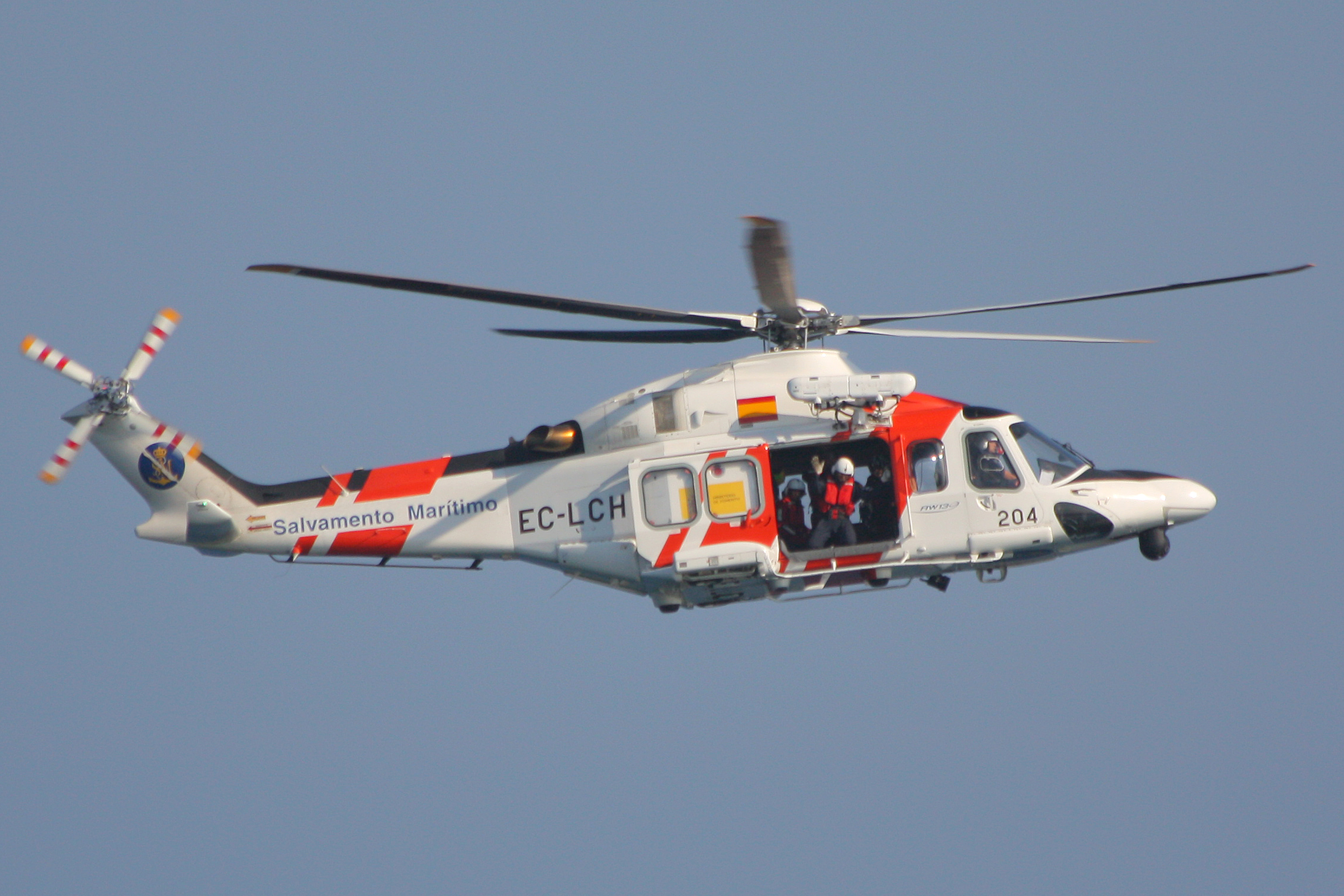
A Maritime Security and Rescue Society AW139SAR rescue helicopter

- 8 AgustaWestland AW139 (another 1 crashed)
- 3 Sikorsky S-61
- 1 Eurocopter EC225
- 3 CASA CN-235(4 in order)
- 3 Cessna 337 Super Skymaster
- 1 Airbus ACH160
- 1 Schiebel Camcopter S-100.

== Aircraft accidents ==
- On 21 January 2010, a Spanish Maritime Safety Agency AW-139SAR crashed into the sea close to Almería. Three of the four on board died.

== Gallery ==
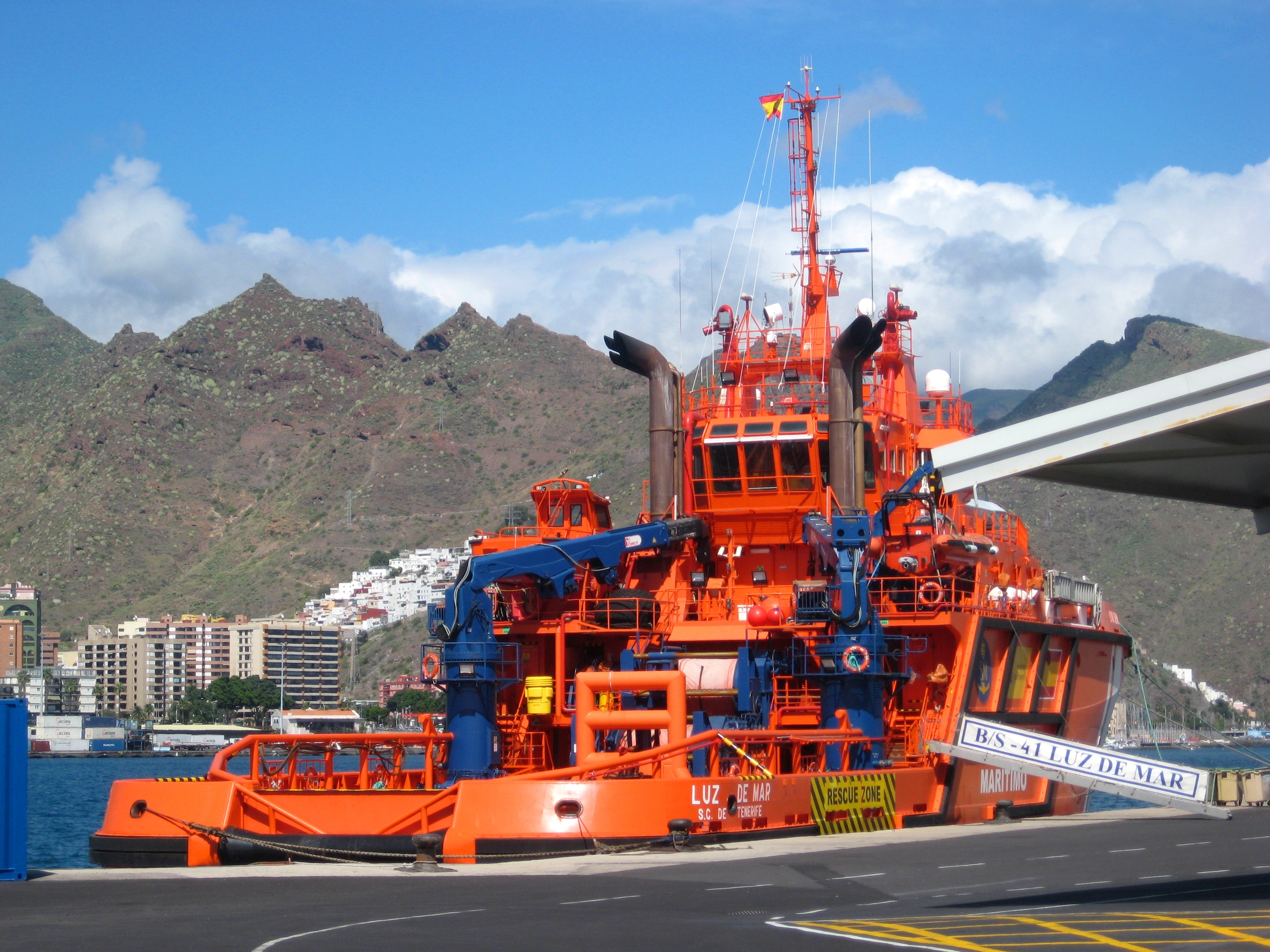
Luz de Mar-class tugboat Luz da Mar.

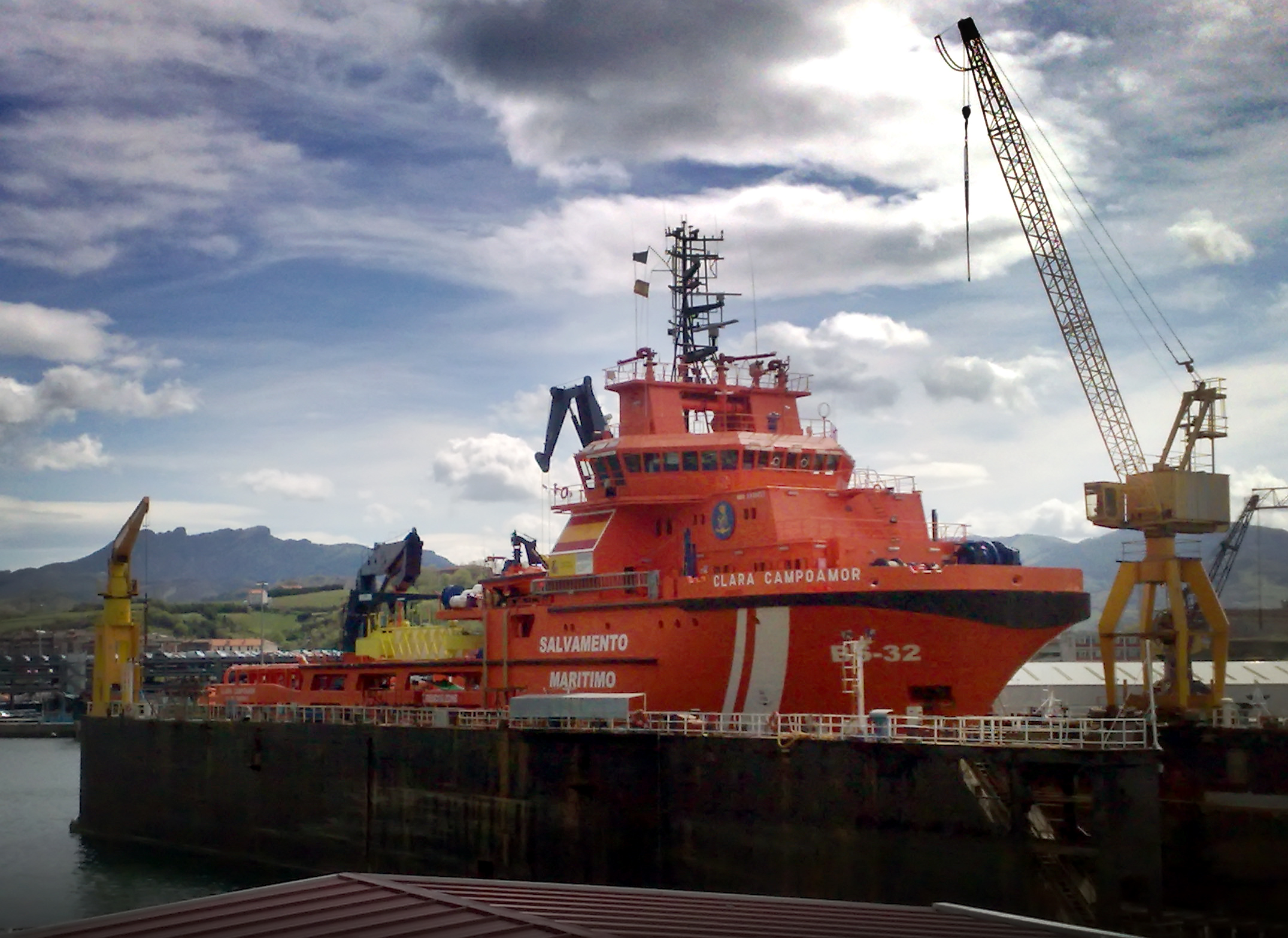
Don Inda-class tugboat Clara Campoamor.

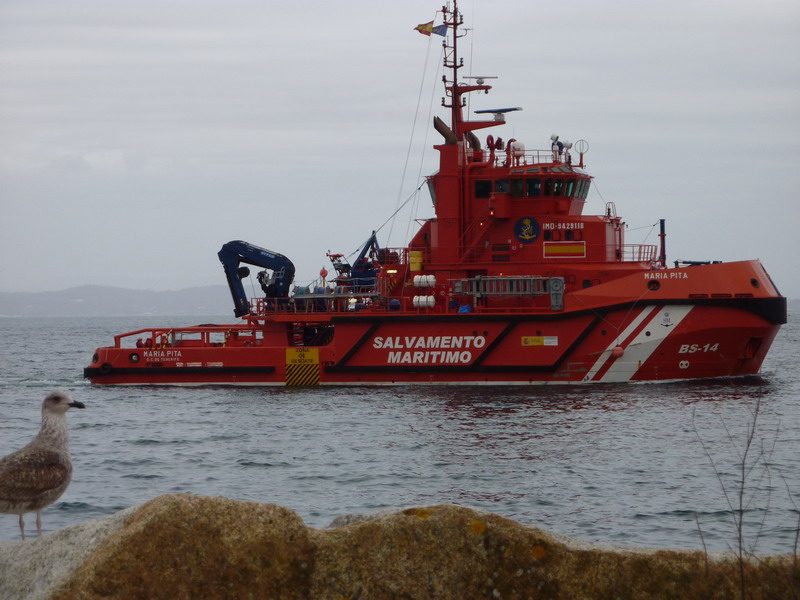
María de Maeztu-class tugboat Maria Pita.

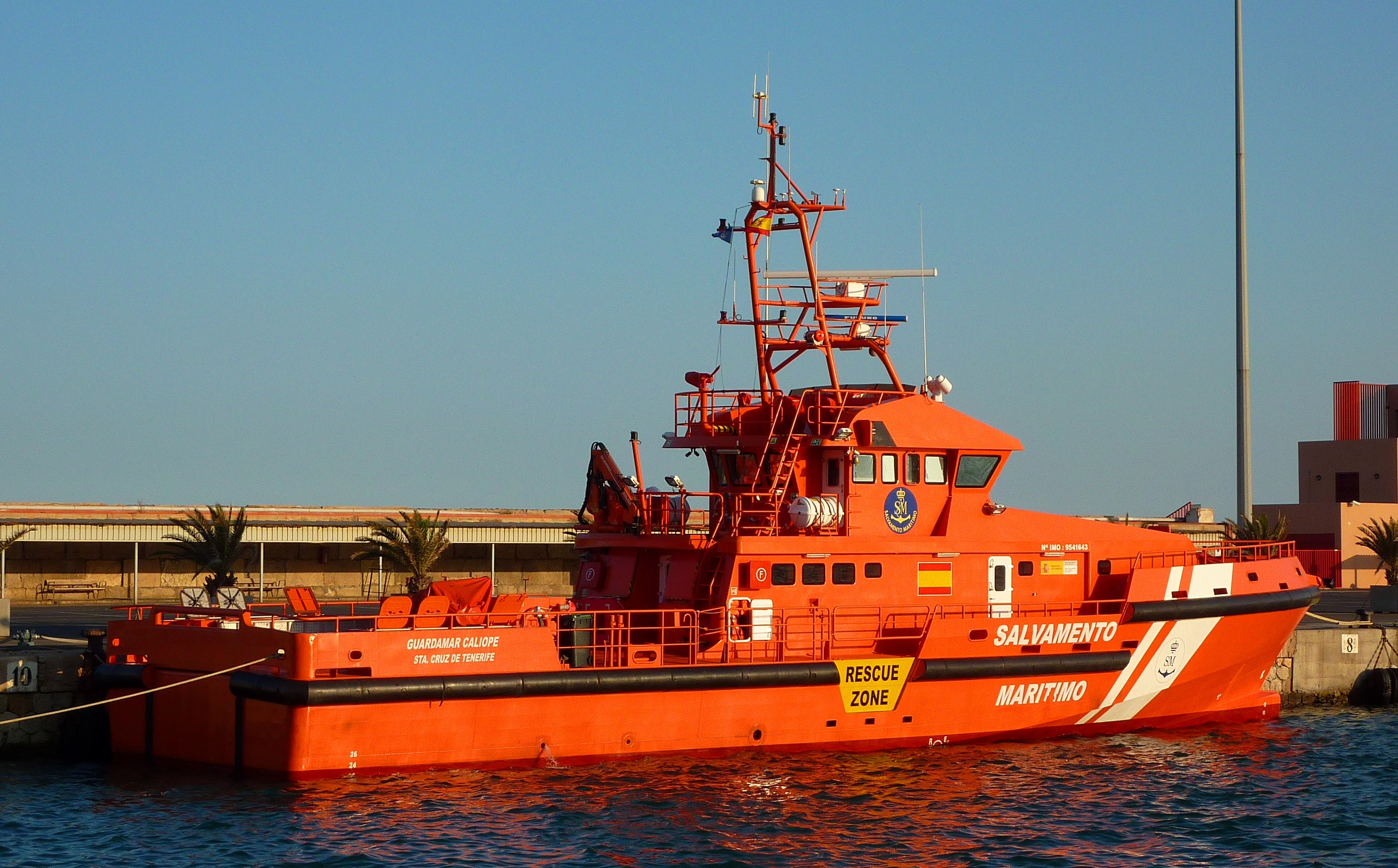
Guardamar-class lifeboat Guardamar Calíope.

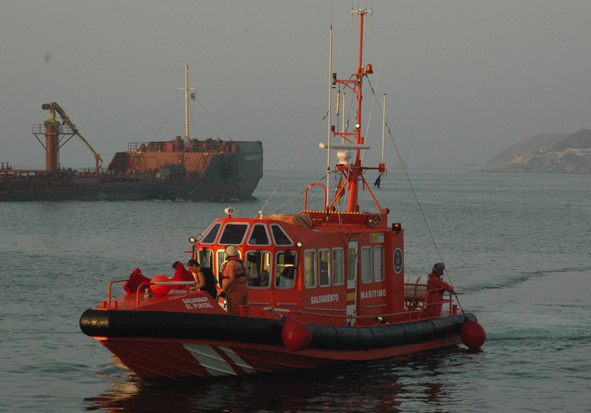
Salvamar-class lifeboat Salvamar El Puntal.

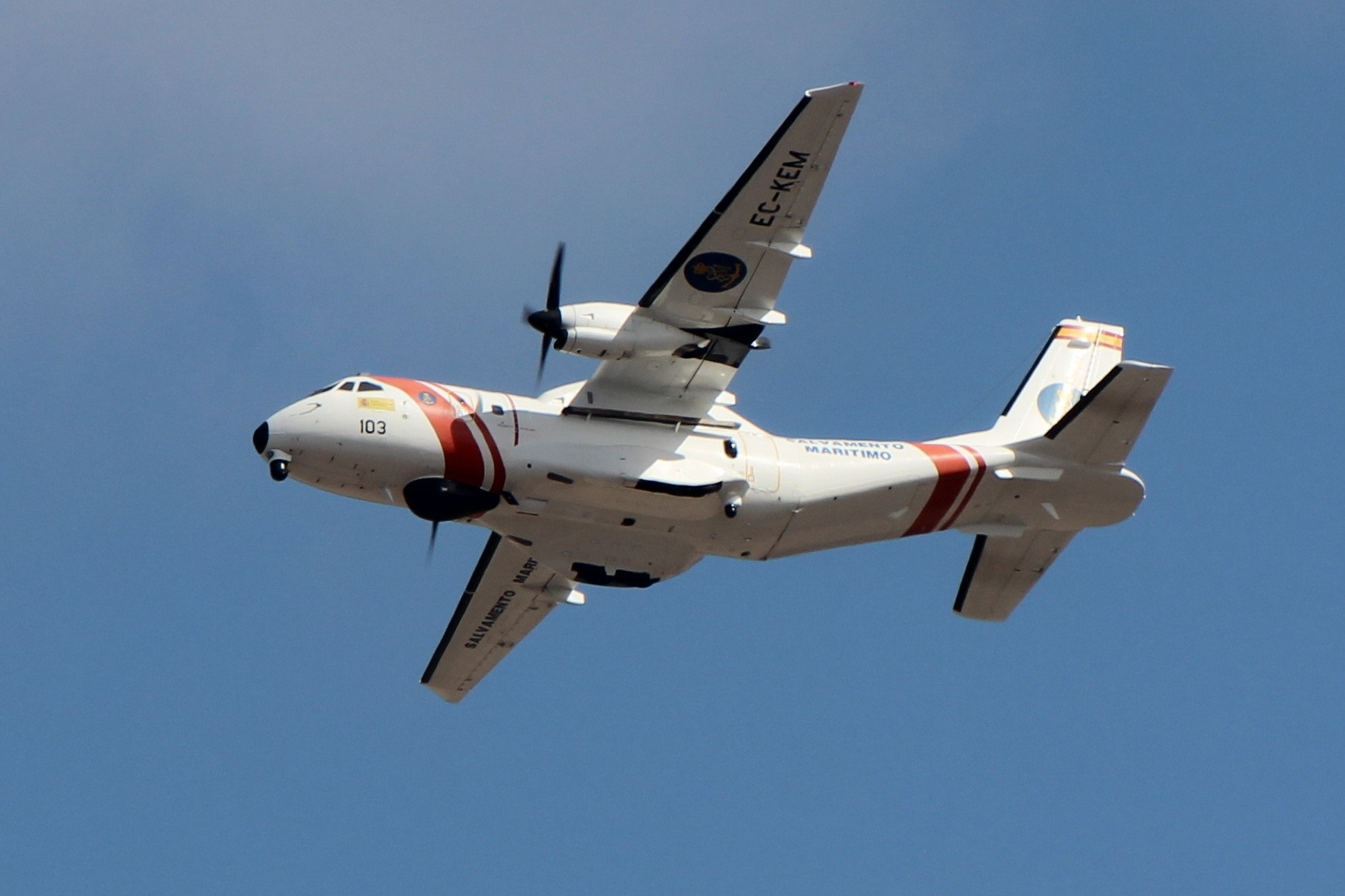
CASA CN-235 maritime patrol aircraft.

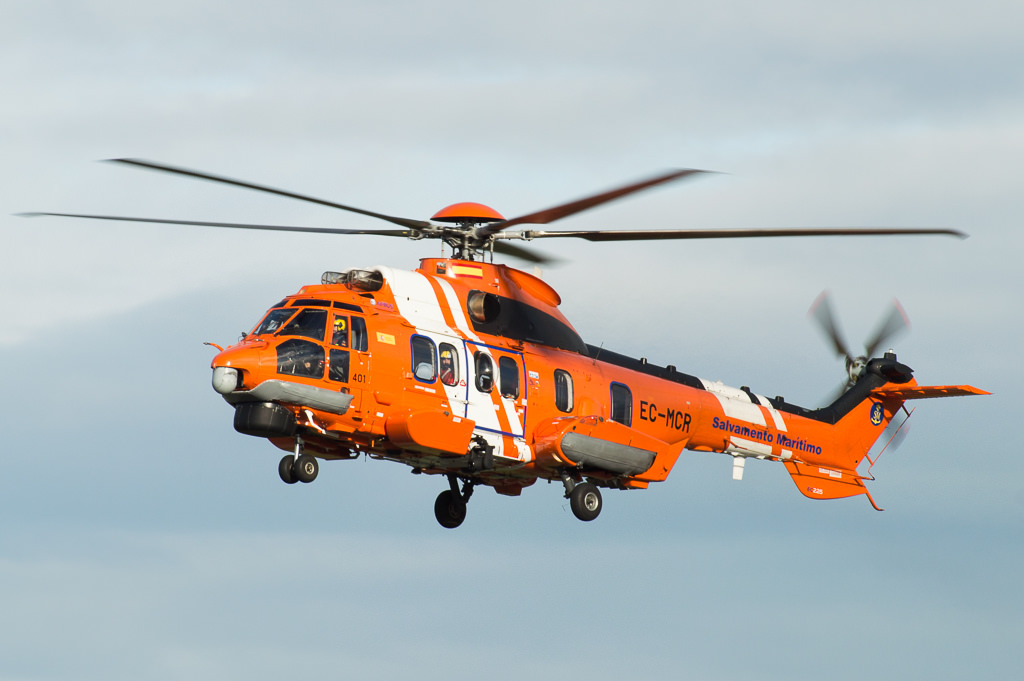
Eurocopter EC225 Super Puma helicopter.

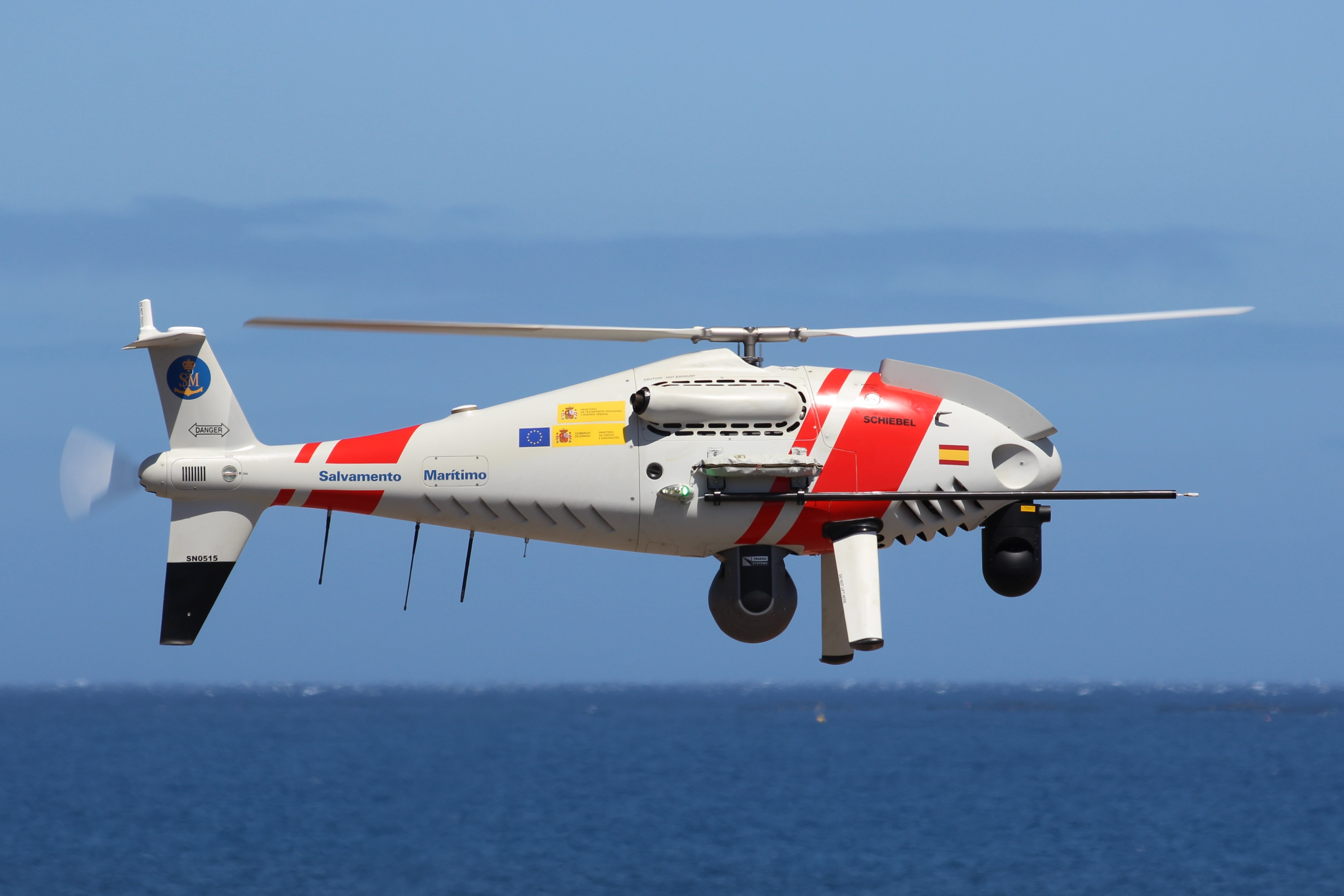
Schiebel Camcopter S-100 unmanned air system.

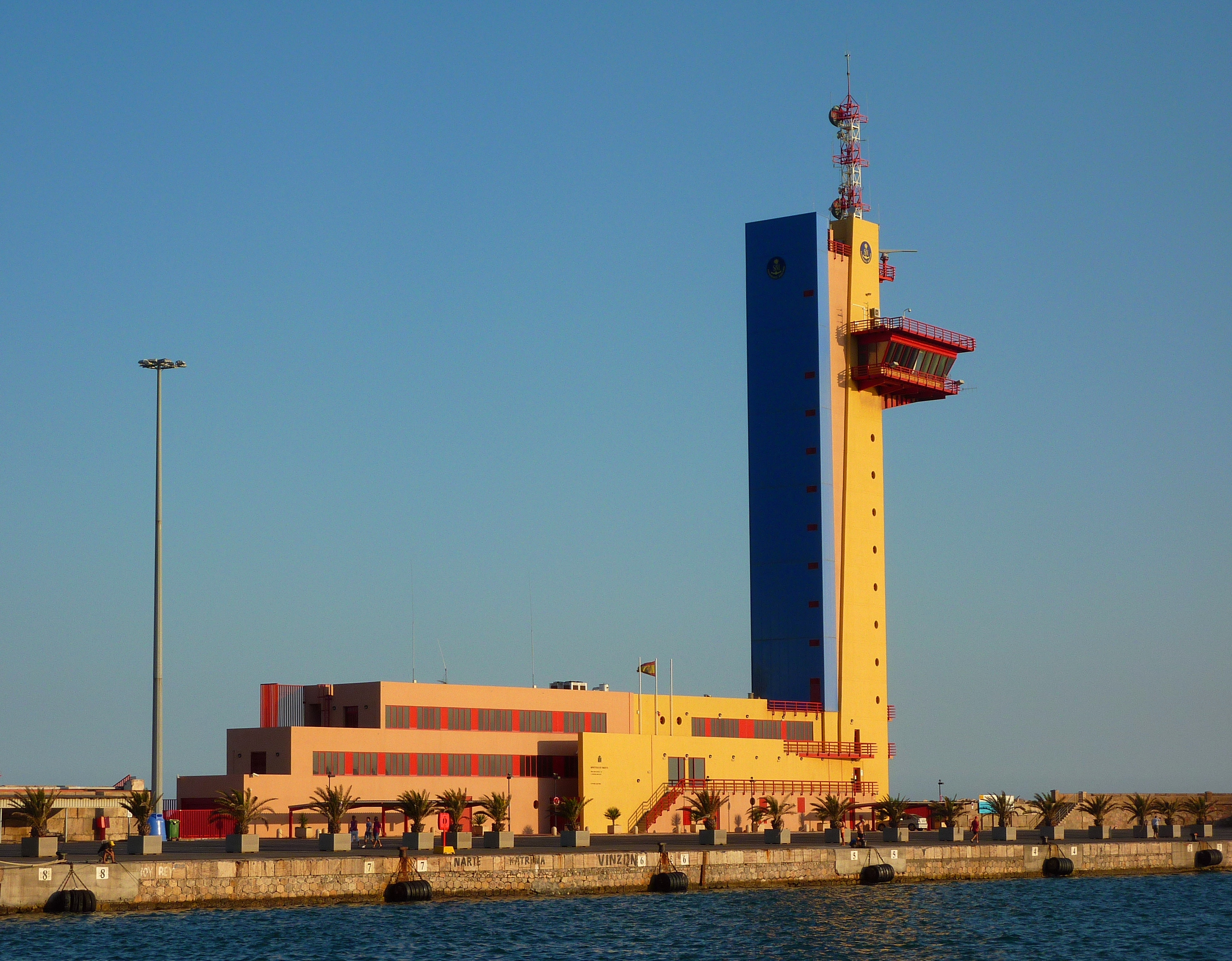
CCS tower at Almería.

== See also ==
- Salvamento Marítimo Humanitario
- Société Nationale de Sauvetage en Mer
- German Maritime Search and Rescue Service
- Helimer 207 helicopter accident
