= Rescuer =

Person who rescues something from harm or danger

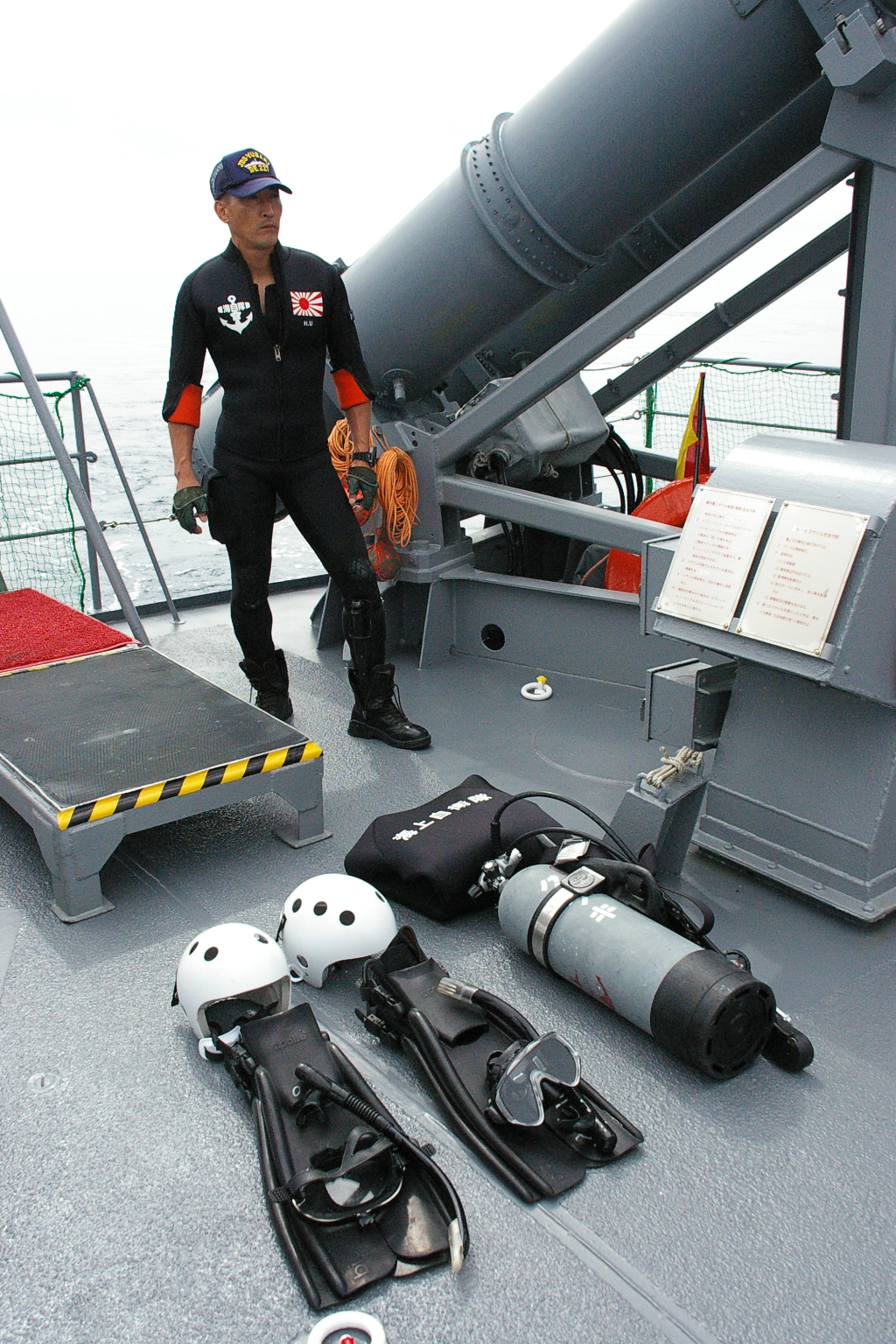
- Japanese JMSDF Rescue diver.

Occupation
- Occupation type: Employment, Recruit Training, Volunteer
- Activity sectors: Rescue, Fire Department, law enforcement, Coast Guard, Military

Description
- Related jobs: Firefighter, Aid worker, Ranger, Diver

A rescuer is a person who saves lives or property from harm or danger. Rescuers are typically trained in some combination of technical rescue, water rescue, mountain rescue, extrication, and firefighting. The term is used both as a job title and as a general description of anyone performing a rescue.

== Types ==
=== Fire department ===
Fire department rescuers are specialist personnel trained and equipped for emergency operations beyond standard firefighting, including confined space rescue, water rescue, high-angle rope rescue, and vehicle extrication.

The organisation of rescue functions varies by country. In many North American fire departments, rescue-trained firefighters are integrated within regular fire companies and take a leading role during rescue operations. Dedicated rescue teams are typically activated during complex incidents such as water rescue, high-angle rescue, confined space emergencies, or large-scale disasters.

In Japan, fire departments organise dedicated rescue companies (救助隊) as distinct units with their own equipment and facilities, classified into standard, special, advanced, and special advanced tiers based on the population and risk profile of the jurisdiction. Candidates must first serve as firefighters before qualifying for rescue selection, and training is highly competitive.

=== Military ===
A rescuer in the military is a soldier or sailor with specialist training in diver rescue, mountain rescue, or extrication. Military rescue personnel serve in roles such as Coast Guard rescue swimmer, combat search and rescue crew, and pararescue specialist. Their primary duty is to recover military or civilian personnel from hazardous environments during combat or peacetime operations.

== See also ==
- Rescue
- Search and rescue
- Rescue Diver
