= Hector Izquierdo Triana =

Commissioner of the Spanish Government for volcanic eruptions

The Most Excellent Hector Izquierdo Triana
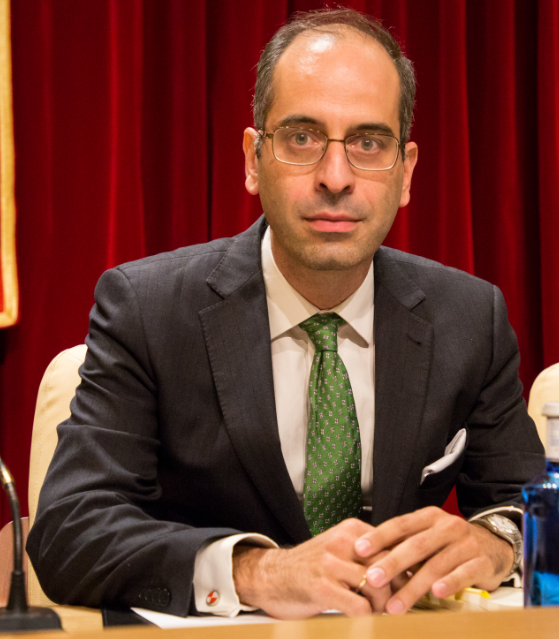

Special Government Commissioner for the Volcano Reconstruction
- Incumbent
- Assumed office 2022

Secretary of State for Finance
- In office 2021–2022

President of the Spanish Tax Agency
- In office 2021–2022

President of the Spanish National Real State Company
- In office 2020–2021

Personal details
- Born: 1 June 1974 (age 52) Los Llanos de Aridane, Spain
- Party: Independent
- Spouse: Eva Balleste
- Children: 2
- Education: PhD ICADE, Executive MBA Instituto de Empresa
- Awards: Knight Grand Cross of the Order of Civil Merit; Medal of Honor from the Illustrious College of Notaries. Commander category.; Professor of the Week Financial Times.

Hector Izquierdo Triana is a Spanish politician who serves as the Special Commissioner for the reconstruction of the 2021 Cumbre Vieja volcanic eruption in La Palma. He was the former Spanish Secretary of State of Finance and President of the Spanish Tax Agency. In 2024, he was awarded with the Knighthood of the Grand Cross of the Royal Order of Civil Merit.

== Biography ==
Triana was born in 1974 in La Palma. He had a Bachelor of laws from ICADE, and in 2016, a Doctor in Philosophy in Economics.

== Career ==
=== Commissioner ===
Triana is the Special Commissioner, created to coordinate and promote the actions adopted by the Government of Spain to repair the damage caused by the 2021 Cumbre Vieja volcanic eruption and for the reconstruction of the island of La Palma, Hector Izquierdo Triana has the rank of Under Secretary and he depends from the Ministry of the Presidency.

The concerns remain as La Palma volcanic eruption ends the post volcano will be tougher than the volcano because there were many fields to work (agriculture, infrastructures, employment, towns closed by gases...). At 85 days, it is the longest known and the most damaging volcanic eruption on La Palma since records began. Hector Izquierdo Triana also helped in the investment of 53 millions € in geothermal in order to become a clean island in the future energy and in fields as ports, strategic lines, hydraulic connections, social services, local taxes or to open the towns in a safe and proper way.

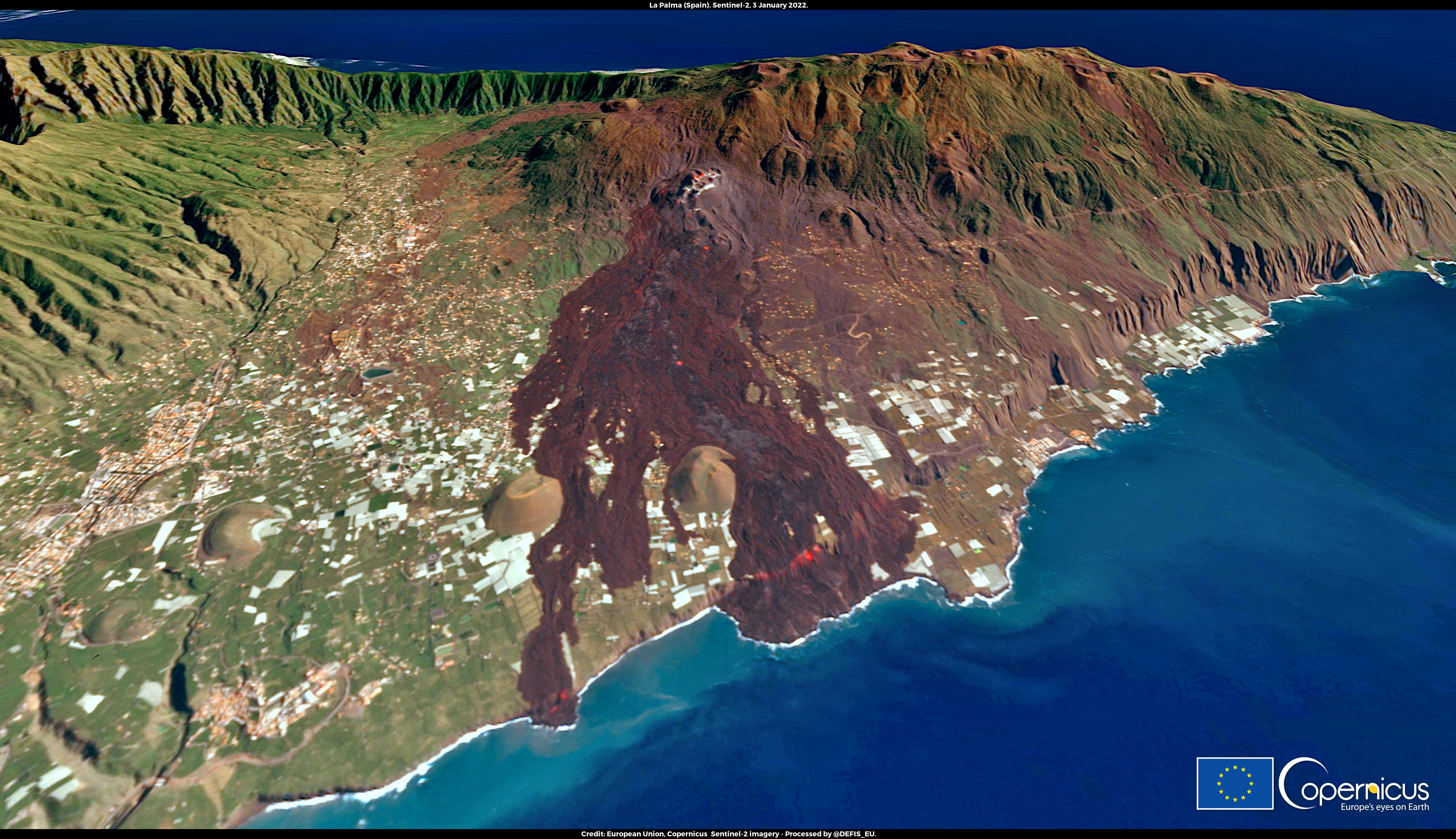
Three-dimensional visualisation (from Copernicus Sentinel-2 satellite imagery) of the Tajogaite vent and its lava flows as of January 2022

The lava flow covered over 1,000 hectares, prompting the evacuation of around 7,000 people and it meant to realocate the people in new houses. The lava flow was about 3.5 kilometres wide and 6.2 kilometres long and reached the sea, destroying more than 3,000 buildings, motorways that Hector Izquierdo Triana worked later with other administration to rebuild and 6,500 beds in towns as Puerto Naos or La Bombilla in Los Llanos de Aridane closed due to carbon dioxide (CO_{2}) diffuse degassing. Hector Izquierdo Triana was born in Puerto Naos and he encouraged the project Alerta CO_{2} to allow the return of the people to their homes. The eruption was assigned a rating on the Volcanic Explosivity Index (VEI) of VEI 3. The volcano released large amounts of toxic sulphur dioxide gas and 30,000 residents were ordered to remain indoors and this meant an important effort in employment. On 25 December, the eruption was declared to have ended after three months. the next step was the process to recover and to improve the economy and to attract tourism in a construction of 1,000 millions € in a critical moment in the history of La Palma.

=== Before Commissioner ===
Hector Izquierdo Triana was Secretary of State for Finance Ministry of Finance, during new tax regulations and transfer of decision-making power, responsibilities and resources to communities. President of the Spanish Tax Agency during the 20 cents discount per litre of fuel as part of an overall financial plan announced to lessen the economic impact on the Spanish economy of the Russian invasion of Ukraine, President of the national real state company SEGIPSA Ministry of Finance in charge of more than 1,000 official buildings to adapt during the COVID-19 pandemic and Internal Audit and Compliance Director at Renfe during the construction of the Haramain High Speed Railway.

He was Professor at IE Business School since 2008, he has also been associated professor at ICADE, University of Deusto and invited professor at Notre Dame University–Louaize (Beirut), KEDGE Business School (Bordeaux), St. Xavier's College Ahmedabad, Insper-ie São Paulo, Saudi Aramco Dhahran to train managers after the IPO, Large Family Business Programs-ie Mexico City, Islamic Development Bank (Jeddah).

He has been teaching in the Jesuits Mission of Dhandhuka for dalits/untouchables and outcasts, who represented the lowest stratum of the caste system in India and with the IE Business School in microcredits for NGO in Cape Coast in Ghana. In May 2013 he was Financial Times "Professor of the Week".

== Awards and honors ==
- Knight Grand Cross of the Royal Order of Civil Merit awarded by the King Felipe VI.
- Medal of Honor from the Illustrious College of Notaries (Ministry of Justice (Spain)) in its Commander category
- Financial Times "Professor of the Week", May 2013.

== Publications ==
He is co-author of several books:

- Economic and Competitive Intelligence Handbook (Expanded Edition) de Tirant lo Blanch (editorial), ISBN 978-8-4113-0135-0.
- Economic and Competitive Intelligence Handbook (Original Edition) de Tirant lo Blanch (editorial), ISBN 978-8-4919-0618-6.
- Audit of a Competitive Intelligence Unit, Taylor&Francis ISSN 2380-0992.
- Fundamentel concepts of Intelligence, Tirant lo Blanch (editorial) ISBN 978-8-4911-9314-2.
- Academic report 2023-2024. Social and economic reconstruction in Puerto Naos and La Bombilla by Tajogaite volcano, Iberdrola Chair of Economic and Business Ethics, Social and Economic ISBN 978-8-4739-9160-5.
- The Economic and Social COVID-19, Escuela de Inteligencia Económica UAM. ISBN 979-8-3558-4518-6.
- Readings on company internationalization. Economic and competitive intelligence in large Spanish companies, Club de Exportadores e Inversores de España. Sanz y Torres. ISBN 978-8-4193-8277-1.
- Code 2022 (Prologue) Éditions Lefebvre Sarrut. ISBN 978-8-4188-9959-1.
- In Treble Clef. Studies on 15-M and citizen movements. Lapsus Calami. ISBN 978-8-4157-8639-9.
- La Palma: an island of opportunities Fundación CajaCanarias. ISBN 978-8-4094-7553-7.
- Application of the Integrated Internal Control Framework (COSO) in the Spanish Public Sector. Instituto de Auditores Internos. ISBN 978-8-4945-5941-9.
