= Estanislao Rodríguez-Ponga =

Spanish economist (born 1956)

Estanislao Rodríguez-Ponga Salamanca is a Spanish economist who was born in Madrid, 20 March 1956. He was Secretary of State for Finance from 2001 to 2004.

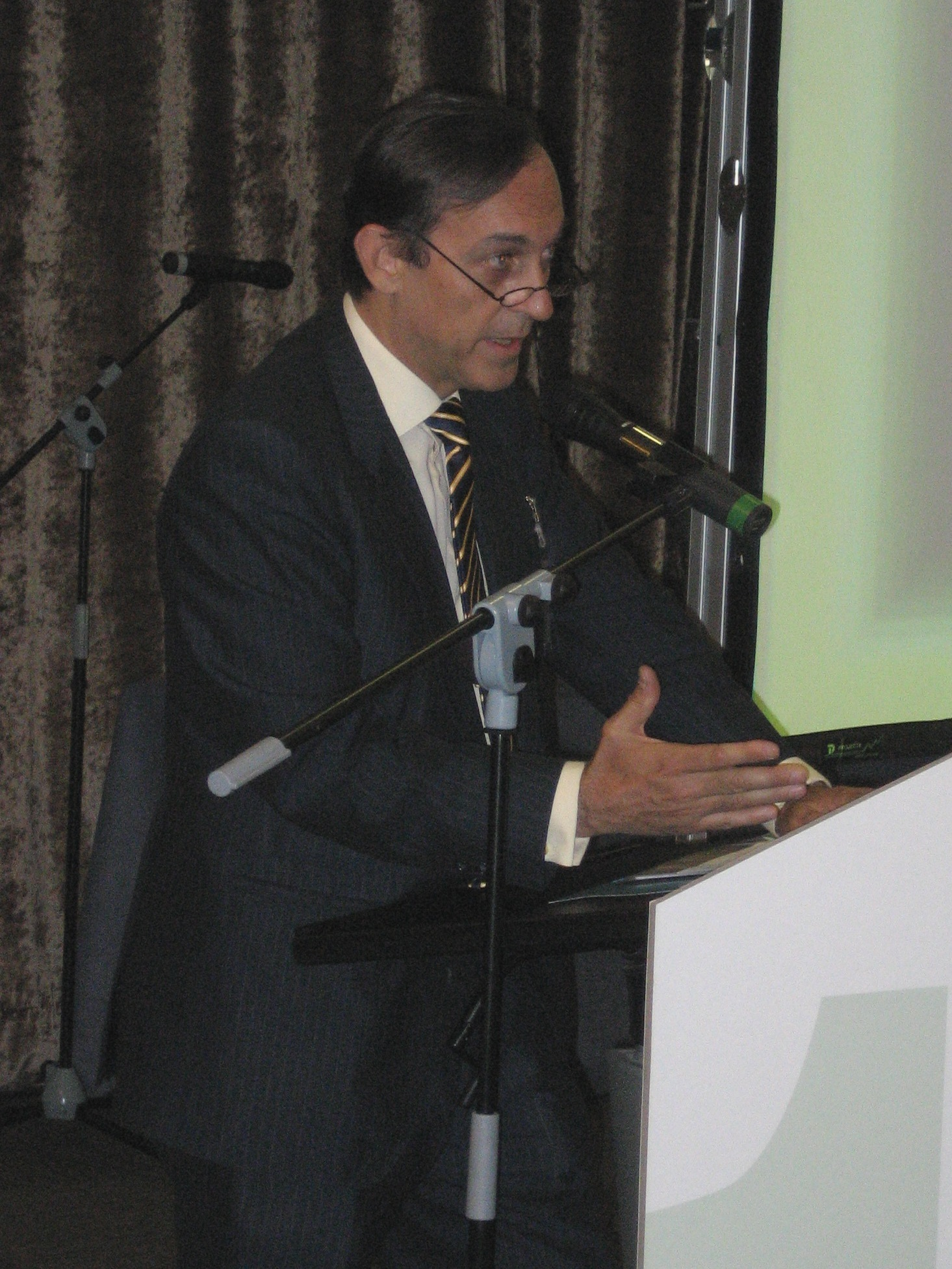

== Education ==
He studied economics at the Complutense University of Madrid, graduating in 1978. He became a Tax Inspector in 1982 and in 1992 he received an MBA from the IE Business School.

== Career ==
He began his professional career in 1982 as Tax Inspector of the Tax Delegation in Madrid and the National Inspection Office. In 1989, Estanislao left his civil job and from that time forth, worked for the private sector: Cremades Abogados (law firm) from 1989 to 1992; BBV from November 1992 to February 1997; Caja Madrid from 1997 to 1999; and Repsol from 1999 to 2000.

In 2000 was appointed as Director-General for Taxes in the Ministry of Finance, whose minister was Cristóbal Montoro. In 2001 was appointed as Secretary of State for Finance and lead the tax reform. The legal activity was reflected in the new Income Tax (IRPF), in the reform of the Corporate Tax (Impuesto de Sociedades), the new Income Tax for non-residents, the Sponsorship Law, and the new General Tax System Law (Ley General Tributaria), taking over the 1963's one. Although a group of Tax Inspectors accused him for not preventing enough the tax evasion, the reality was that the Tax Administration National Agency (Agencia Tributaria) increased the rates of tax evasion detection in 16%.

For the autonomous regions, the new model of autonomic financing, the new economic agreement with the Basque Country and the new economic agreement with Navarre were approved.

Regarding the local taxes, both the Cadastre Law (Catastro) and the new Law for local taxes (Ley de Haciendas Locales) were also approved. Furthermore, the double imposition agreements were expanded to 20 countries more.

In 2002, he was the president of the European Union Tax Committee, writing the proposals of savings, tobacco and energetic community directives.

In 2002, the Public Prosecutor's Office accused him for the alleged creation of a finance products handbook, found in BBV. The judge, Baltasar Garzón dismissed the accusation because Estanislao was not working in BBV when the handbook was, supposedly, created. Eventually, in 2006, another judge, Fernando Grande-Marlaska shelved definitely the case.

After Spanish Socialist Workers' Party won the general election in 2004, he resigned his position. Afterwards, he was awarded with the Knighthood of the Grand Cross of the Order of Isabella the Catholic.

Since 2004, he participates in different boards of directors. In 2006, he was elected as a member of the board of directors of Caja Madrid. He is the treasurer of the Economists Association of Madrid and manager in El Corte Inglés.
