= Secretary of State for Finance =

- Secretario de Estado de Hacienda
- Coat of Arms used by the Government

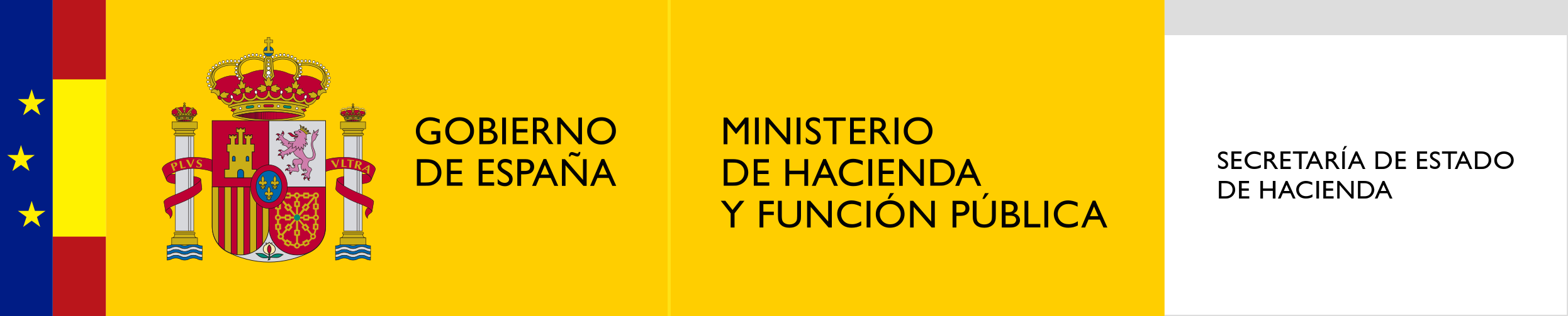

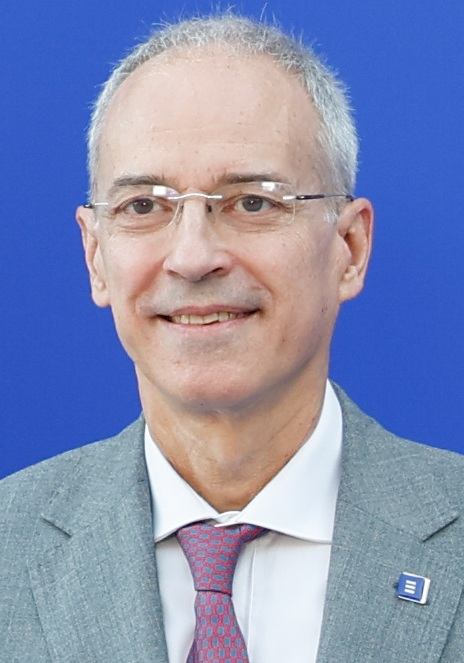
- Incumbent; Jesús Gascón Catalán since 9 June 2022
- Ministry of Finance; Secretariat of State for Finance; Spanish Tax Agency
- Style: The Most Excellent (formal); Mr./Ms. Secretary of State (informal)
- Abbreviation: SEH
- Member of: Government Delegated Committee for Economic Affairs; Fiscal and Financial Policy Council; National Commission on Local Administration
- Nominator: The Finance Minister
- Appointer: The Monarch
- Precursor: Under-Secretary of Finance
- Formation: December 7, 1982; 43 years ago
- First holder: José Víctor Sevilla
- Website: hacienda.gob.es

The secretary of state for finance is a senior minister of the Spanish Ministry of Finance responsible for assisting the minister in the design and implementation of the fiscal and tax policies.

It is also responsible for the forecasting and analysis of tax, non-tax and other public revenues, the management of the cadastre and assisting the minister in matters of financial collaboration with other public administrations, regional and local financing, and the exercise of State financial oversight to guarantee the country's budgetary stability and financial sustainability.

As the highest-ranking official responsible for tax and financial policies, the secretary of state is the President of the Spanish Tax Agency and is a member of the Government Delegated Committee for Economic Affairs, the Fiscal and Financial Policy Council and the National Commission on Local Administration.

The secretary of state is appointed by the Monarch on the advice of the Finance Minister. Since 9 June 2022, finance inspector José Gascón Catalán, former executive director of the Spanish Tax Agency (2018–2022), has served as sercretary of state.

== History ==
In December 1982, the ministries of Finance and Economy were merged, and to assist the minister of finance and economy in its financial responsabilities the position of Secretary of State for Finance was established. In its early years, the Secretariat of State was responsible for all kind of taxes, fiscal policy and financing of all administrations, legal counsel (Solicitor General), State properties, budget and accounts auditing.

Over the years, it gradually transferred powers to other Ministry's officials, such as the Office of the Solicitor General or the management of State properties in 1984, which were transferred to the Under-Secretary, or everything related to budget matters, European funds and auditing of accounts, which was transferred in 1996 to the new Secretary of State for Budget and Expenditure.

From April 2004 to December 2011, all budgetary powers returned to this Secretariat of State when the one for budget and expenditure was suppressed. At this time, the position was known as "Secretary of State for Finance and Budget".

== Organization ==
The secretary of state is the head of the Secretariat of State and, by the minister's delegation, is the ultimate authority responsible for taxation, cadastre and government financing.

The secretary of state is assisted by a secretary-general, two directors-general and supervises the Central Economic-Administrative Court, whose head has the rank of director-general.

Secretariat of State Organization as of 2026
| Secretary of State | Cabinet (Chief of Staff) |
| Secretary of State | Spanish Tax Agency |
| Secretary of State | Customs Surveillance Service |
| Secretary of State | Institute for Fiscal Studies |
| Secretary-General for Regional and Local Financing | Directorate-General for Budgetary Stability and Territorial Financial Management |
| Secretary-General for Regional and Local Financing | Deputy Directorate-General for Regional Financing Management |
| Secretary-General for Regional and Local Financing | Deputy Directorate-General for Regional Budgetary Analysis and Statistics |
| Secretary-General for Regional and Local Financing | Deputy Directorate-General for Sustainability and Regional Financial Policy |
| Secretary-General for Regional and Local Financing | Deputy Directorate-General for Local Financing Management |
| Secretary-General for Regional and Local Financing | Deputy Directorate-General for Local Budgetary and Financial Management |
| Secretary-General for Regional and Local Financing | Deputy Directorate-General for Regional Financial Studies |
| Secretary-General for Regional and Local Financing | Deputy Directorate-General for Regional Tax Relations |
| Secretary-General for Regional and Local Financing | Deputy Directorate-General for Local Financial Studies |
| Secretary-General for Regional and Local Financing | Deputy Directorate-General of Systems and Applications for Territorial Financing |
| Directorate-General for Taxes | Deputy Directorate-General for Tax Policy |
| Directorate-General for Taxes | Deputy Directorate-General for Taxes |
| Directorate-General for Taxes | Deputy Directorate-General for Personal Income Taxes |
| Directorate-General for Taxes | Deputy Directorate-General for Corporate Taxes |
| Directorate-General for Taxes | Deputy Directorate-General for Consumption Taxes |
| Directorate-General for Taxes | Deputy Directorate-General for Financial Operations Taxes |
| Directorate-General for Taxes | Deputy Directorate-General for Property Taxes, Fees and Service Charges |
| Directorate-General for Taxes | Deputy Directorate-General for Special Taxes and Foreign Trade and Environmental Taxes |
| Directorate-General for Taxes | Deputy Directorate-General for International Taxation |
| Directorate-General for Taxes | Deputy Directorate-General for Local Taxes |
| Directorate-General for Taxes | Deputy Directorate-General for Organization and Resource Management |
| Directorate-General for the Cadastre | Deputy Directorate-General for Property Valuation and Inspection |
| Directorate-General for the Cadastre | Deputy Directorate-General for Cadastral Management, Coordination and Citizen Services |
| Directorate-General for the Cadastre | Deputy Directorate-General for Technology and Digital Systems |
| Directorate-General for the Cadastre | General Secretariat |
| Central Economic-Administrative Court | Deputy Directorate-General for Organization, Resources and Procedures |
| Central Economic-Administrative Court | General Secretariat |
| Central Economic-Administrative Court | 12 Court Members |
| Central Economic-Administrative Court | Regional and Local Economic-Administrative Courts |

== List of secretaries of state ==
| Officeholder | | Term | | | Government | |
| Officeholder | | Start | End | Duration | Government | |
|---|---|---|---|---|---|---|
| 1 | José Víctor Sevilla Segura | 8 December 1982 | 2 February 1984 | 1 year, 56 days | Felipe González | Juan Carlos I (1975–2014) |
| 2 | Josep Borrel | 2 February 1984 | 16 March 1991 | 7 years, 42 days | Felipe González | Juan Carlos I (1975–2014) |
| 3 | Antonio Zabalza Martí | 16 March 1991 | 24 July 1993 | 2 years, 130 days | Felipe González | Juan Carlos I (1975–2014) |
| 4 | Enrique Martínez Robles | 24 July 1993 | 8 May 1996 | 2 years, 289 days | Felipe González | Juan Carlos I (1975–2014) |
| 5 | Juan Costa | 8 May 1996 | 6 May 2000 | 3 years, 364 days | José María Aznar | Juan Carlos I (1975–2014) |
| 6 | Enrique Giménez-Reyna Rodríguez | 6 May 2000 | 28 July 2001 | 1 year, 83 days | José María Aznar | Juan Carlos I (1975–2014) |
| 7 | Estanislao Rodríguez-Ponga | 28 July 2001 | 20 April 2004 | 2 years, 267 days | José María Aznar | Juan Carlos I (1975–2014) |
| 8 | Miguel Ángel Fernández Ordóñez | 20 April 2004 | 11 March 2006 | 1 year, 325 days | José Luis Rodríguez Zapatero | Juan Carlos I (1975–2014) |
| 9 | Carlos Ocaña y Pérez de Tudela | 11 March 2006 | 11 June 2011 | 5 years, 92 days | José Luis Rodríguez Zapatero | Juan Carlos I (1975–2014) |
| 10 | Juan Manuel López Carbajo | 11 June 2011 | 24 December 2011 | 196 days | José Luis Rodríguez Zapatero | Juan Carlos I (1975–2014) |
| 11 | Miguel Ferre Navarrete | 31 December 2011 | 12 November 2016 | 4 years, 317 days | Mariano Rajoy | Juan Carlos I (1975–2014) |
| 11 | Miguel Ferre Navarrete | 31 December 2011 | 12 November 2016 | 4 years, 317 days | Mariano Rajoy | Felipe VI (2014-present) |
| 12 | José Enrique Fernández de Moya | 12 November 2016 | 9 June 2018 | 1 year, 209 days | Mariano Rajoy | Felipe VI (2014-present) |
| 13 | Inés Bardón Rafael | 9 June 2018 | 12 January 2022 | 3 years, 217 days | Pedro Sánchez | Felipe VI (2014-present) |
| 14 | Hector Izquierdo Triana | 12 January 2022 | 9 June 2022 | 148 days | Pedro Sánchez | Felipe VI (2014-present) |
| 15 | Jesús Gascón Catalán | 9 June 2022 | Incumbent | 4 years, 90 days | Pedro Sánchez | Felipe VI (2014-present) |

== See also ==
- Taxation in Spain
- Revenue service
- Balanced budget amendment
- Cadastre
