= Spanish Tax Agency =

Agency overview
- Formed: January 1, 1992; 34 years ago
- Employees: 26,363 (2024)
- Annual budget: €1.82 billion (2024)

Jurisdictional structure
- Operations jurisdiction: Spain
- Constituting instrument: General State Budget Act, 1990
- Specialist jurisdictions: Customs, excise, gambling; Taxation

Operational structure
- Headquarters: Madrid, Spain
- Agency executives: Jesús Gascón Catalán, President; Antonio Francisco Ansón Latorre, Chief executive officer
- Parent agency: Ministry of Finance
- Child agency: Customs Surveillance Service

Website
- www.agenciatributaria.es

The Spanish Tax Administration Agency (Spanish: Agencia Estatal de Administración Tributaria, AEAT), commonly known as Agencia Tributaria, is the revenue service of the Kingdom of Spain. The agency is responsible for the effective application of the national tax and customs systems and for those resources of other Public Administrations and the European Union whose management is entrusted to it by law or agreement.

For the investigation, prosecution and repression of contraband and other crimes related to organized crime, drug trafficking or money laundering it counts on a law enforcement agency, the Customs Surveillance Service.

== History ==
The Tax Agency was created officially in 1991 by the General State Budget Act of December 27, 1990 (in force since January 1, 1991) but it was not effectively formed until January 1, 1992. It was set up as an autonomous agency attached to the former Ministry of Economy and Treasury through the former Secretariat of State for Finance and Budget. As an autonomous agency, it has its own legal regulation different from that of the General State Administration, a regulation which, without detriment to the essential principles that must preside over every administrative performance, confers a certain autonomy to it in budgetary and personnel management issues.

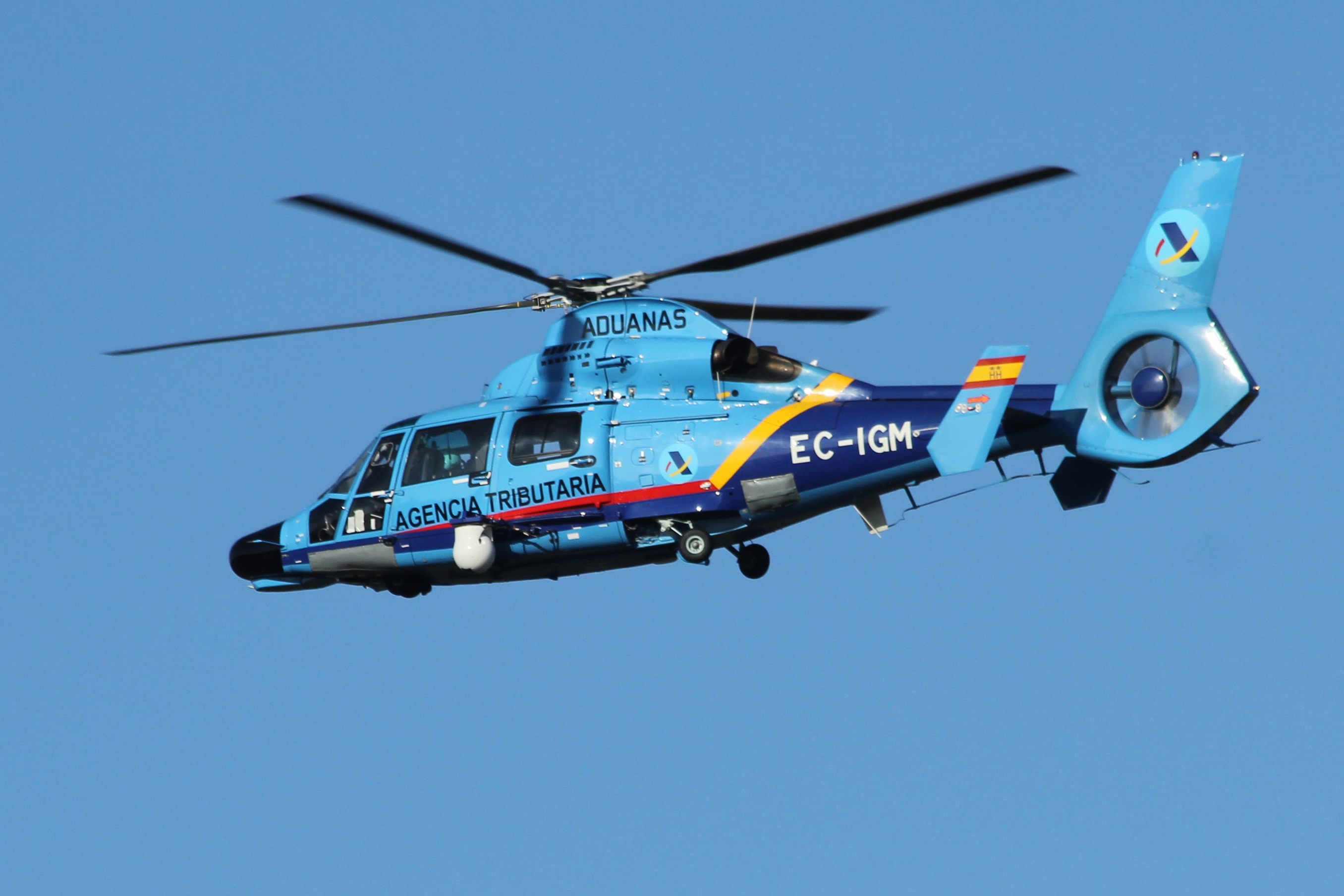
Helicopter of the AEAT

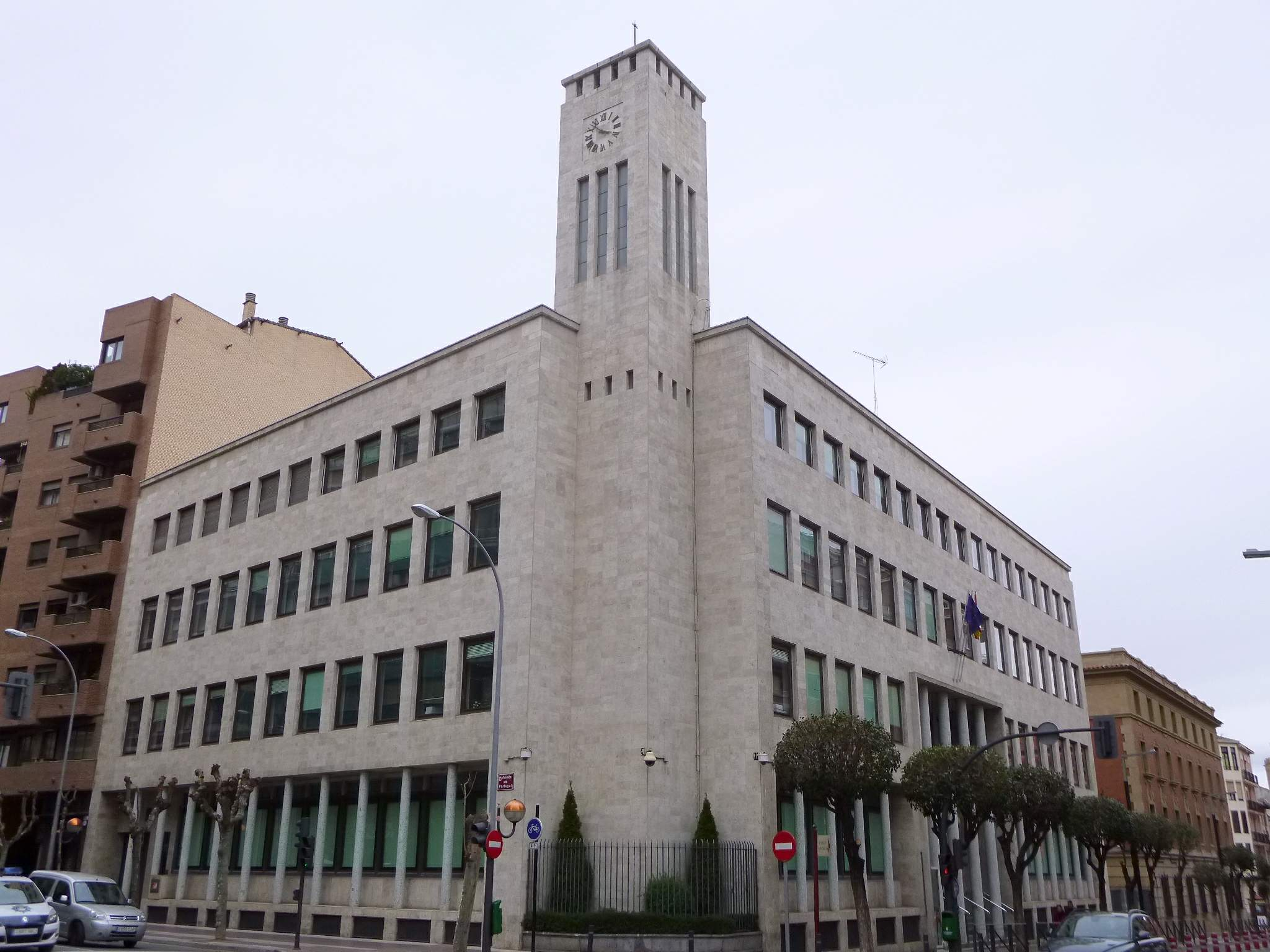
AEAT regional headquarters in Logroño, Spain

== Functions and mission ==
It is therefore the Tax Agency's duty to apply the tax system in such a way that the constitutional principle is complied with by virtue of which everyone has to contribute to the maintenance of public expenditure according to his or her economic capacity. Yet, it does not have the powers for the elaboration and approval of tributary norms nor can it assign, in the aspect of public expenditure, the public resources among the different aims. The function of integral management of the state and customs tax system materialises in a wide ensemble of activities, among which there are the following:

- The management, inspection and collection of the taxes that belong to the State (Personal Income Tax, Corporation Income Tax, Income Tax for Non-Residents, Value Added Tax and Special Taxes).
- The performance of important functions in relation to the income of the Autonomous Communities and Autonomous Cities, not only concerning the management of the Income Tax, but also the collection of other income from these regions, whether by legal regulation or by the relevant collaboration agreements.
- The collection of revenue on behalf of the European Union.
- The management of customs and the repression of smuggling.
- The collection of taxes due to the State Public Sector in the voluntary payment period.
- The collection, through enforcement, of public revenue due to the General State Administration and associated or dependent Public agencies.
- Participation in the persecution of certain offences, including offences against the Public Treasury and offences related to contraband of goods.

Likewise, other autonomous and local bodies manage own taxes and transferred taxes.

The mission of the Tax Agency is to encourage all citizens to discharge their tax duties. It performs two lines of action to achieve this: on the one hand, the provision of information and assistance services for taxpayers in order to minimise the indirect costs associated with meeting tax obligations and, on the other, through the detection and correction of tax defaults through control actions.

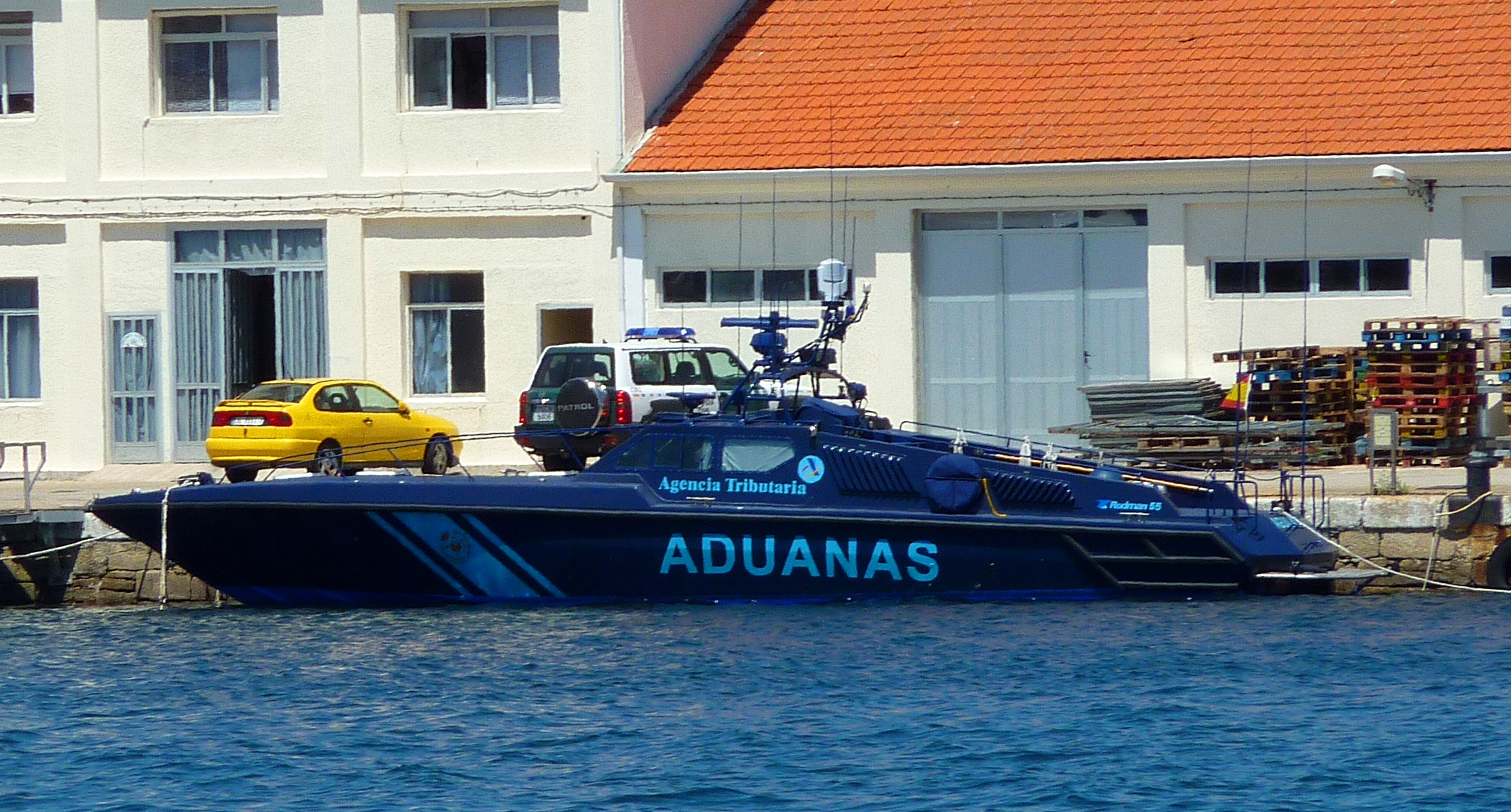
Ship of the AEAT

== Government of the agency ==
The head of the AEAT is the President, a position hold always by the person who holds the office of Secretary of State for Finance. As such, the office of AEAT President is held ex officio by a government official which is appointed by the Council of Ministers at the request of the Minister of Finance.

Due to this, the chief executive of the agency is the Director-General, which has the rank of Under-Secretary. The Director-General is appointed in the same way that the President.

== Structure ==
- President of the AEAT
  - Superior Council for the Management and Coordination of Tax Management
  - Standing Steering Committee
  - Coordination Committee of the Territorial Directorate
  - Committee on Security and Control
- Director-General of the AEAT
  - Cabinet
  - Internal Audit Service
  - Comptroller Delegation.
  - Support Unit to the Special Prosecutor (economic crimes).
  - Department for Tax Management

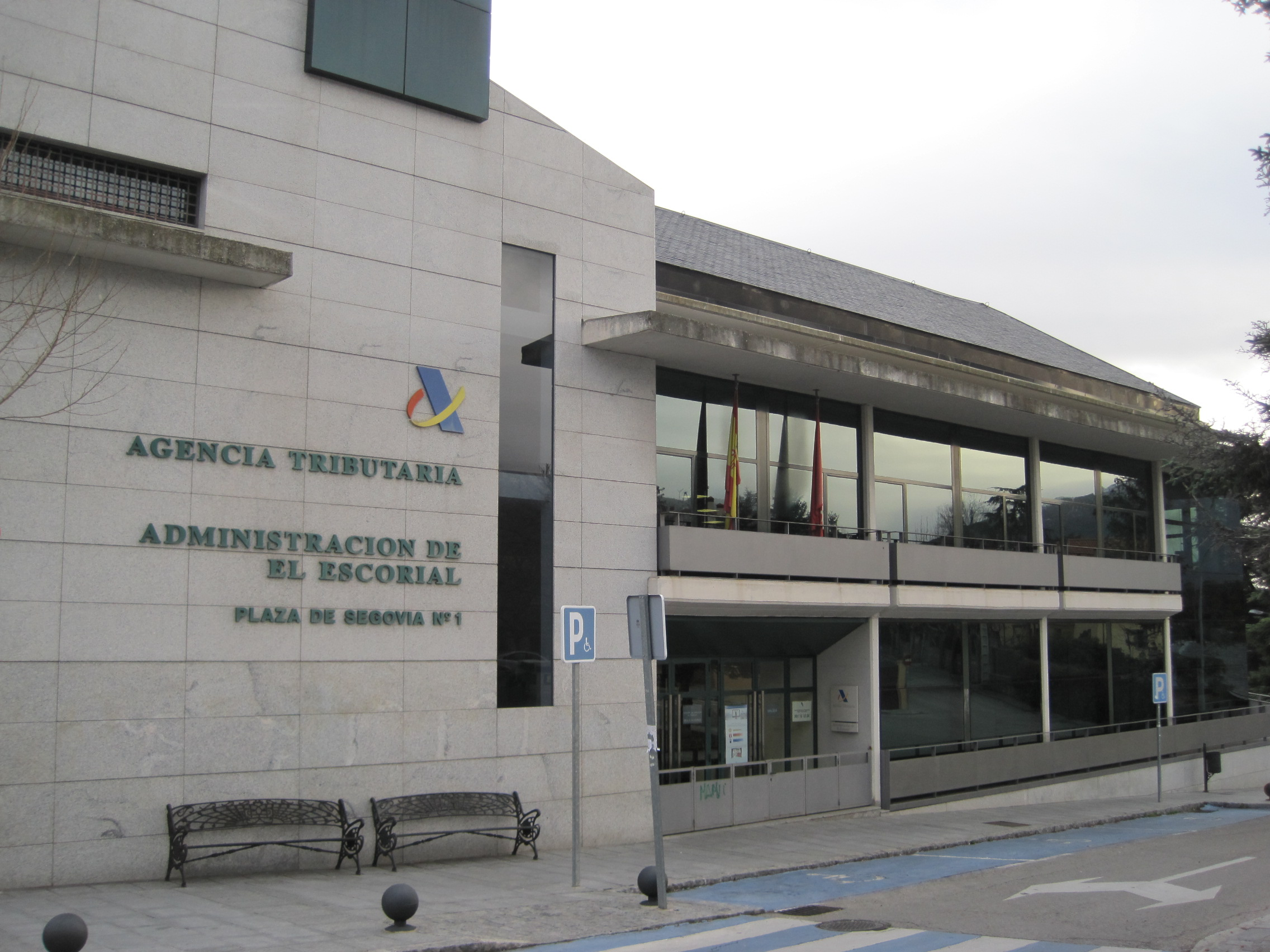
AEAT headquarters in El Escorial, Spain

  - Department for Financial and Tax Inspection
  - Department for Tax Collections
  - Department for Customs and Special Taxes
  - HR Department
  - Department for Tax Computing
  - Legal Service
  - Economic Management Service
  - Taxation and Statistics Service
  - Planning and Institutional Relations Service
  - Central Delegation for Great Contributors
  - Special Delegations

The agency is organized in 17 special delegations, one for each autonomous community. Of these, it depends 39 smallest delegations and another 31 special delegations for customs and special taxes. With competencies throughout the national territory, there is the Central Delegation for Great Taxpayers (which are persons or companies which contribute a lot or with some specials taxes).

== List of presidents ==
- José Víctor Sevilla Segura
- Josep Borrel
- Antonio Zabalza Martí
- Enrique Martínez Robles
- Juan Costa
- Enrique Giménez Reyna
- Estanislao Rodríguez-Ponga
- Miguel Ángel Fernández Ordóñez
- Carlos Ocaña y Pérez de Tudela
- Juan Manuel López Carbajo
- Miguel Ferre Navarrete
- José Enrique Fernández de Moya
- Inés Bardón Rafael
- Hector Izquierdo Triana

== See also ==
Similar revenue services:

- Internal Revenue Service, United States of America.
- HM Revenue and Customs, United Kingdom.
- Administración Federal de Ingresos Públicos, Argentina.
- Australian Taxation Office, Australia.
- Receita Federal do Brasil, Brazil.
