= Commission for the Tobacco Market =

Agency of the Spanish Department of Finance

- Comisionado para el Mercado de Tabacos
- CMT logotype

Agency overview
- Formed: December 11, 1998; 27 years ago
- Preceding agency: Government Delegation on the Tobacco Monopoly (1887–1998)
- Jurisdiction: Spain
- Headquarters: Madrid
- Employees: 46 (As of 31 December 2024)
- Annual budget: € 30.2 million, 2025
- Agency executive: Luis Gavira Caballero, Chairman
- Parent agency: Ministry of Finance
- Website: CMT website

The Commission for the Tobacco Market (Spanish: Comisionado para el Mercado de Tabacos, CMT) is a regulatory agency of the Spanish Ministry of Finance responsible for ensuring compliance with tobacco regulations and guaranteeing free competition in the tobacco market.

== History ==
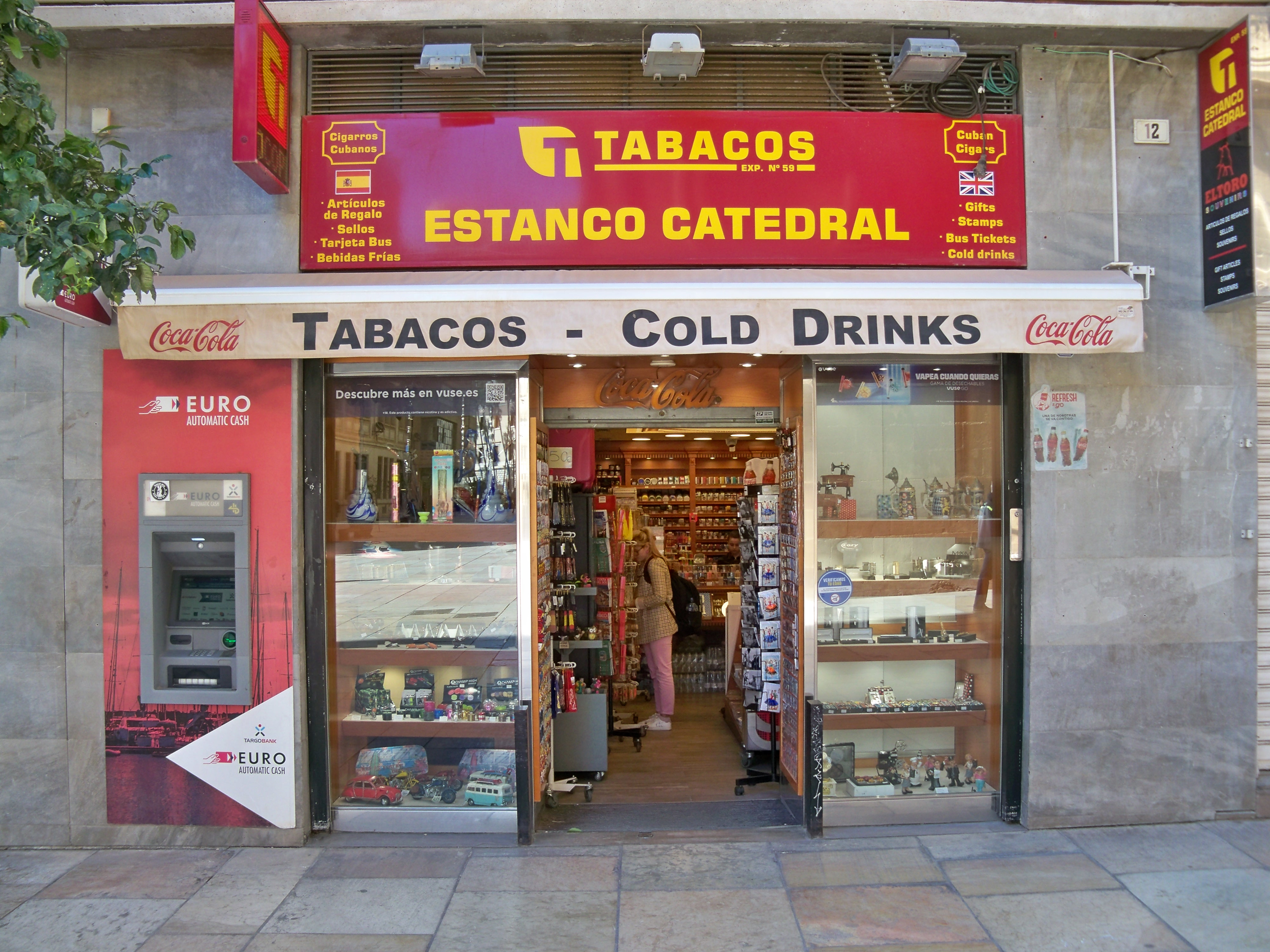
Tobacconist shop in Málaga, an establishment that sells tobacco, postage stamp, stamped paper, and other products that are also prohibited from being sold freely.

With Spain's entry into the European Communities, the national government committed to guaranteeing freedom of business in the manufacturing, importing, and wholesale of tobacco products, a right also protected by Article 38 of the Spanish Constitution. In this way, Spain had to reduce its influence in a highly intervened market (until then, it constituted a state monopoly), replacing this intervention with surveillance that would guarantee the free market.

Consequently, the Cortes Generales approved the Tobacco Market Regulation and Tax Regulations Act of 1998, which replaced the Government Delegation on the Tobacco Monopoly with a new agency, the Commission for the Tobacco Market. Also, this law abolished the manufacturing, import, and wholesale trade monopolies for tobacco products not originating in European Union member states. However, following European jurisprudence and the judgment of the Court of Justice of the European Communities of 14 December 1995 (Case C-387/93 "Banchero Case"), the monopoly on retail trade in tobacco products was maintained in favour of the State through the Red de Expendedurías de Tabaco y Timbre (Network of Tobacco and Stamp Retailers).

Since then, to establish one of these stores (tobacconist), interested parties must submit bids to public auctions, and the bidder with the highest price will be awarded the contract. The government also reserves the right to determine the number of stores needed based on territorial, commercial, profitability, public service, distance between stores, and population criteria.

The Tobacco Market Regulation and Tax Regulations Act established a simple structure, based on a central figure: the Chair of the Commission for the Tobacco Market. Subsequently, the CMT's internal rules created the position of Vice-Chair, to assist the President in the day-to-day management of the agency.

In July 2025, the agency was restructured, harmonizing its structure with that of other government agencies. First, a Governing Council was created as a collegiate governing body, while the Vice-Chair—which performed domestic management tasks—was eliminated and replaced by a Secretary-General. Furthermore, the agency was structured into three additional deputy directorates-general: Administration of the Tobacco Monopoly and State Stamp; Legal Coordination and Relations with Operators; and Supervision. Finally, the financial, personnel, asset, and contracting regime was updated, and operators were required to communicate with the Commission through electronic means.

== Structure ==
The CMT is structured as follows:

- The Governing Council. It is the highest and collective governing body of the Tobacco Market Commission.
- The Chairperson. With the rank of deputy director-general, the chairperson is appointed by the finance minister and is responsible for directing the agency's activities and setting the objectives of the different administrative units. The latter are:
  - The Secretary-General, who assists the chairperson in the day-to-day management of the agency.
  - The Deputy Directorate-General for Administration of the Tobacco Monopoly and State Stamp.
  - The Deputy Directorate-General for Legal Coordination and Relations with Operators.
  - The Deputy Directorate-General for Supervision.

There is also an Advisory Committee to provide assistance and advice to the agency's departments on all matters relating to the tobacco market, as well as its organization and operation.

== Chairpersons ==
1. Santiago Cid Fernández (1998–2000)
2. Tomás Suárez-Inclán González (2000–2004)
3. Felipe Sivit Gañán (2004–2012)
4. Juan Luis Nieto Fernández (2012–2017)
5. Isabel Eugenia Juliani Fernández de Córdoba (2017–2019)
6. Luis Gavira Caballero (2020–present)

== See also ==
- Tobacconist
- Royal Tobacco Factory
- Tabacalera
