= José Enrique Fernández de Moya =

Spanish politician

José Enrique Fernández de Moya Romero
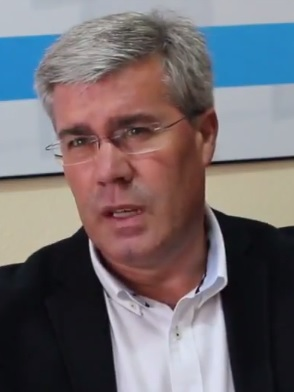

Secretary of State for Finance
- In office 11 November 2016 – June 2018
- President: Mariano Rajoy
- Preceded by: Miguel Ferre Navarrete
- Succeeded by: Inés Bardón

Mayor of Jaén, Spain
- In office 11 June 2011 – 23 November 2015
- Preceded by: Carmen Peñalver
- Succeeded by: Francisco Javier Márquez Sánchez

Member of the Congress of Deputies
- In office 13 January 2016 – 11 November 2016
- Constituency: Jaén

Senator from Jaén
- In office 13 December 2011 – 27 October 2015

Member of the Andalusian Parliament
- In office 1998–2008

Personal details
- Born: April 17, 1969 (age 57) Jaén, Spain
- Party: People's Party
- Education: University of Jaén
- Profession: Professor of Financial Law

José Enrique Fernández de Moya Romero (17 April 1969) is a Spanish politician. He served as Secretary of State for Finance and, therefore, ex officio President of the Spanish Tax Agency from 2016 to June 2018. He was also the Mayor of Jaén and a member of the Congress of Deputies.

== Career ==
Fernández de Moya is an associate professor of Financial Law in the Department of Civil Law, Financial, and Tax Law at the University of Jaén.

== Political career ==
He joined the People's Party in 1991 and served as provincial president of the party's youth organization, Nuevas Generaciones, from 1994 to 1995. From 1996 to 2000, he was the party's Secretary General in Jaén, and in 2000, he became its president. Between 2002 and 2015, he was Deputy Secretary General of the Andalusian People's Party, responsible for Studies and Programs. He was a member of the Andalusian Parliament during the 7th and 8th legislatures. In 2011, he was elected senator for the province of Jaén, a position he held until 2015.

In 2017, he stepped down as provincial president of the People's Party in Jaén, endorsing Juan Diego Requena as his successor. Requena won in a controversial primary election in which Fernández de Moya and the then-General Coordinator of the party in Jaén, Miguel Contreras, allegedly committed irregularities to prevent the victory of Miguel Moreno Lorente, the mayor of Porcuna, who was favored by party members.

=== Mayor of Jaén ===
In the 2011 municipal elections, Fernández de Moya led the People's Party list for the Jaén city council and secured an absolute majority. He took office on June 11. In 2015, he was re-elected but without an absolute majority. That same year, he was nominated as the lead congressional candidate for Jaén in the general elections. Following this decision, it was announced that he would leave the mayoralty to focus on the national elections, and Francisco Javier Márquez Sánchez, the councilor for Urbanism and Housing, would replace him. On November 23, 2015, he formally resigned as mayor.

=== Member of Parliament ===
After the general elections, he secured a seat in the Congress of Deputies. He served during the short legislature, and following the dissolution of the Cortes and the subsequent repeat elections, he was re-elected. He resigned in November 2016 after being appointed Secretary of State for Finance.

=== Secretary of State for Finance ===
On 11 November 2016, Minister of Finance and Civil Service Cristóbal Montoro Romero appointed him Secretary of State for Finance. Following this appointment, he resigned from his seat in Congress and was replaced by Javier Calvente Gallego.

In June 2018, he was dismissed as Secretary of State for Finance and succeeded by Inés Bardón after a motion of no confidence.

=== Departure from Politics ===
After his dismissal as Secretary of State for Finance, Fernández de Moya left active politics and returned to his position as a professor at the University of Jaén.
