= Customs Surveillance Service =

Law enforcement agency of the Spanish Ministry of Finance

Customs Surveillance Service Servicio de Vigilancia Aduanera
- Badge of the Spanish Customs Service
- Common name: Aduanas (Customs)
- Abbreviation: SVA or DAVA
- Motto: Por tierra, mar y aire Through land, sea and air

Agency overview
- Formed: Since the 16th century; reorganized on February 12, 1982
- Preceding agencies: Servicio Especial de Vigilancia Fiscal; Servicio Especial de Vigilancia Marítima y Terrestre de Tabacalera S.A.
- Employees: 2,276 (2025)

Jurisdictional structure
- National agency: Spain
- Operations jurisdiction: Spain
- Governing body: Government of Spain
- Constituting instruments: Decreto Real 319/1982; Ley Orgánica 12/1995
- Specialist jurisdictions: Customs, excise, gambling; National border patrol, security, integrity

Operational structure
- Overseen by: Department of Customs and Special Taxes
- Headquarters: Madrid, Spain
- Minister responsible: Arcadi España, Minister of Finance and Public Administrations
- Agency executives: Jesús Gascón Catalán, Agency's President; Soledad Fernández Doctor, Agency's Director-General
- Parent agency: Agencia Tributaria

Website
- Web site

The Customs Surveillance Service (Spanish: Servicio de Vigilancia Aduanera, SVA), officially Deputy Directorate for Customs Surveillance (Spanish: Dirección Adjunta de Vigilancia Aduanera, DAVA), is a law enforcement agency of the Spanish Ministry of Finance, integrated in the Spanish Tax Agency. Its responsibilities include the investigation and prosecution of cases involving smuggling, illegal drug trade, and related crimes, such as money laundering and tax evasion.

Its activities can be compared with United States agencies like the Drug Enforcement Administration, Bureau of Alcohol, Tobacco, Firearms and Explosives, or some of the U.S. Customs and Border Protection, as well as UK's Border Force.

== History ==
=== Origins ===
The origin of the service goes back to the creation of a paramilitary organization (called in Spanish Resguardo) to protect the monopoly of tobacco of the Tabacalera (the oldest tobacco company in the world), a Spanish tobacco monopoly which was established in 1636. The primary duty of the Resguardo was to protect the monopoly that the State exercised over the tobacco, combatting smuggling since its trade was one of the primary sources of funds of the Spanish Royal Treasury between the seventeenth and the 18th centuries.

=== Recent history ===
Recent history of the service begins in 1944 with the creation of the Servicio Especial de Vigilancia Marítima y Terrestre de Tabacalera S.A. (Special Service of Maritime and Terrestrial Surveillance from Tabacalera) charged of preventing the tobacco contraband. In 1954 due to the ineffectiveness of the service its duties were assumed by the Spanish Treasury who reorganized the service and created the Servicio Especial de Vigilancia Fiscal (Special Service of Fiscal Surveillance), made up of military and civilian personnel, which assumed the task of fighting the contraband. In 1982 the service was reorganized under the Servicio de Vigilancia Aduanera (Customs Surveillance Service) and its duties were broadened to include the investigation of economic crimes and the fight against illegal drugs, among other roles.

== Activities ==
The most common duties of the SVA are regulated by the Royal Decree 319/1982 and the Organic Law against contraband 12/1995.

Those are the investigation, discovery and prosecution of contraband violations throughout the nation, territorial waters and airspace. The force also has powers conferred by the Spanish Tax Agency (Agencia Tributaria) regarding economic crimes, including the fight against corruption, fraud investigation in foreign trade and money laundering, among other roles.

The SVA cooperates with international and European organizations such as the European Anti-Fraud Office, Europol or the World Customs Organization.

== Organisation ==
=== Central Services ===
The Deputy Directorate of Customs Surveillance (Spanish: Dirección Adjunta de Vigilancia Aduanera, DAVA) is integrated into the Department of Customs and Special Taxes (Spanish: Departamento de Aduanas e Impuestos Especiales) of the Spanish Tax Agency of the Ministry of Finance.

The customs headquarters is in Madrid.

Department of Customs and Special Taxes

- Deputy Directorate of Customs Surveillance
  - Section of Operations (Subdirección General de Operaciones)
  - Section of Logistics (Subdirección General de Logística)
- Section of Planning, Statistics and Coordination (Subdirección General de Planificación, Estadística y Coordinación)
- Section of Customs Management (Subdirección General de Gestión Aduanera)
- Section of Management and Control of Special Taxes (Subdirección General de Gestión e Intervención de Impuestos Especiales)
- Section of Inspection and Investigation (Subdirección General de Inspección e Investigación)
- Section of Chemicals and Technologies (Subdirección General Químico-Tecnológica)
- Section of International Relations (Subdirección General de Relaciones Internacionales)

=== Territorial Services ===
Regional Operations Area

- Operations Units
- Maritime Bases
- Air Bases

== Armament and equipment ==
=== Air ===
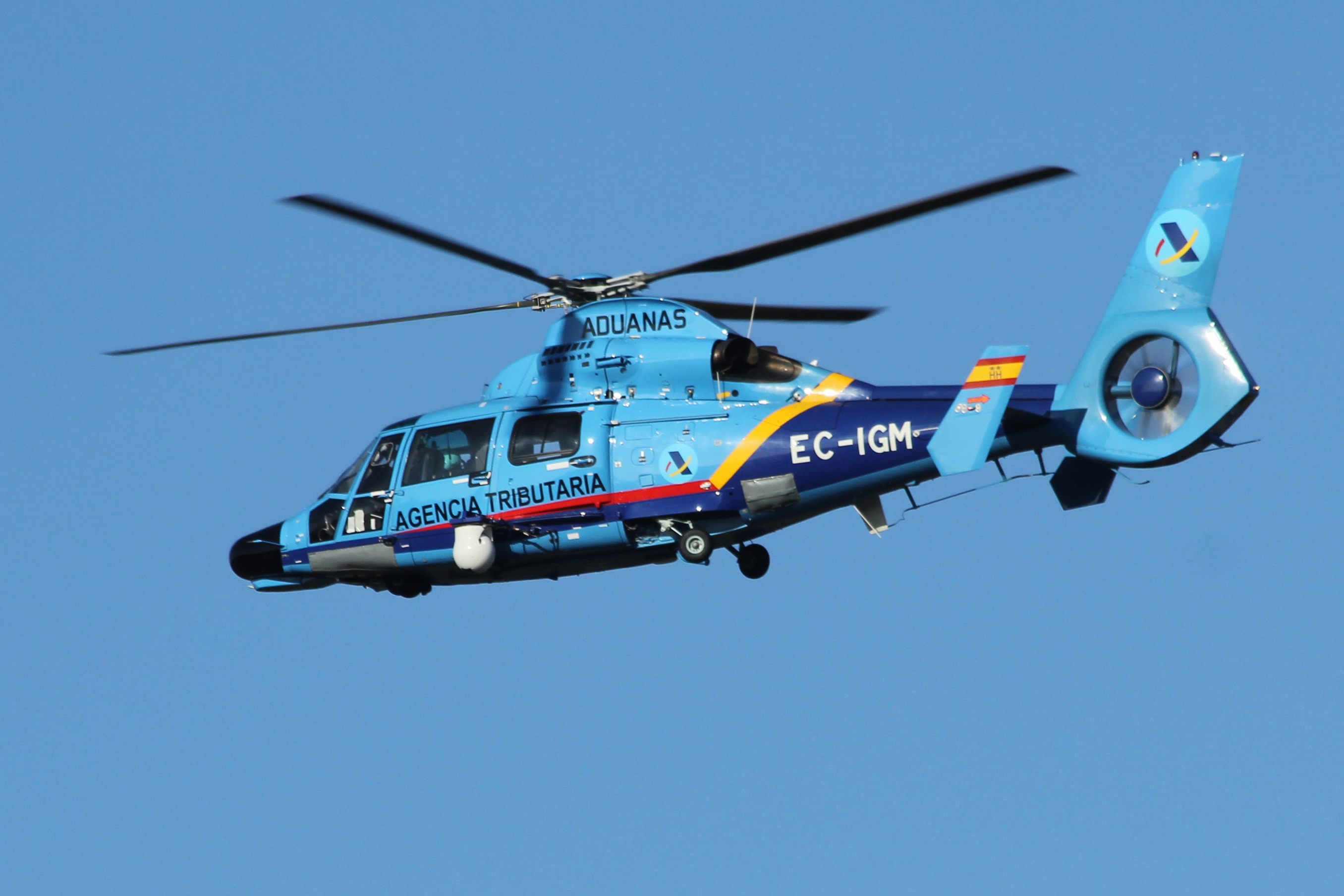
SVA's Eurocopter AS365 Dauphin

The aircraft fleet consists of CASA C-212 Aviocar maritime patrol aircraft and MBB Bo 105, Dauphin and BK117 helicopters manufactured by Eurocopter.

=== Maritime ===
Ship racing stripe

Flag of the Spanish Customs with a double crowned H, symbol of the Spanish Royal Treasury

The maritime component of the Customs Surveillance Service is one of the largest employed by the Spanish government with approximately 90 vessels in service. The maritime units of the service are classed as Spanish Navy auxiliary vessels (Decree 1002/1961, of maritime surveillance).

- Special operations ships: 2 ships for special operations and counter-drug patrols. These ships have both a medium helicopter deck, long range interceptors and deployable pursuit boats (DPB), detention cells, etc.
- High endurance ships: 18 of different classes. Equipped with deployable pursuit boats.
- Medium endurance ships and high speed interception boats: 24 different classes. Depending on which class they are they carry deployable pursuit boats.
- Others, including rigid inflatable boats, boats seized from smugglers and used by the service, etc.

==== Maritime special operations units ====
The special operations units of the Customs Maritime Service are responsible for tracking drug shipments from foreign points-of-origin and interdicting them in international waters, supported by the investigations of ground staff.

=== Ground forces ===
Most of the vehicles used are unmarked while some of them are marked, specially those deployed in airports and seaports or in specific operations. They also are equipped with mobile scanners for non-intrusive inspections. Investigation units have special equipment to accomplish their missions like thermal cameras, interceptions devices, etc.

=== Small arms ===
Spanish customs agents are armed with the 9mm Heckler & Koch USP Compact pistols and Heckler & Koch MP5 submachine guns. Also 7.62mm MG3 and .50 caliber M2 machine guns are mounted on vessels.

== Gallery ==
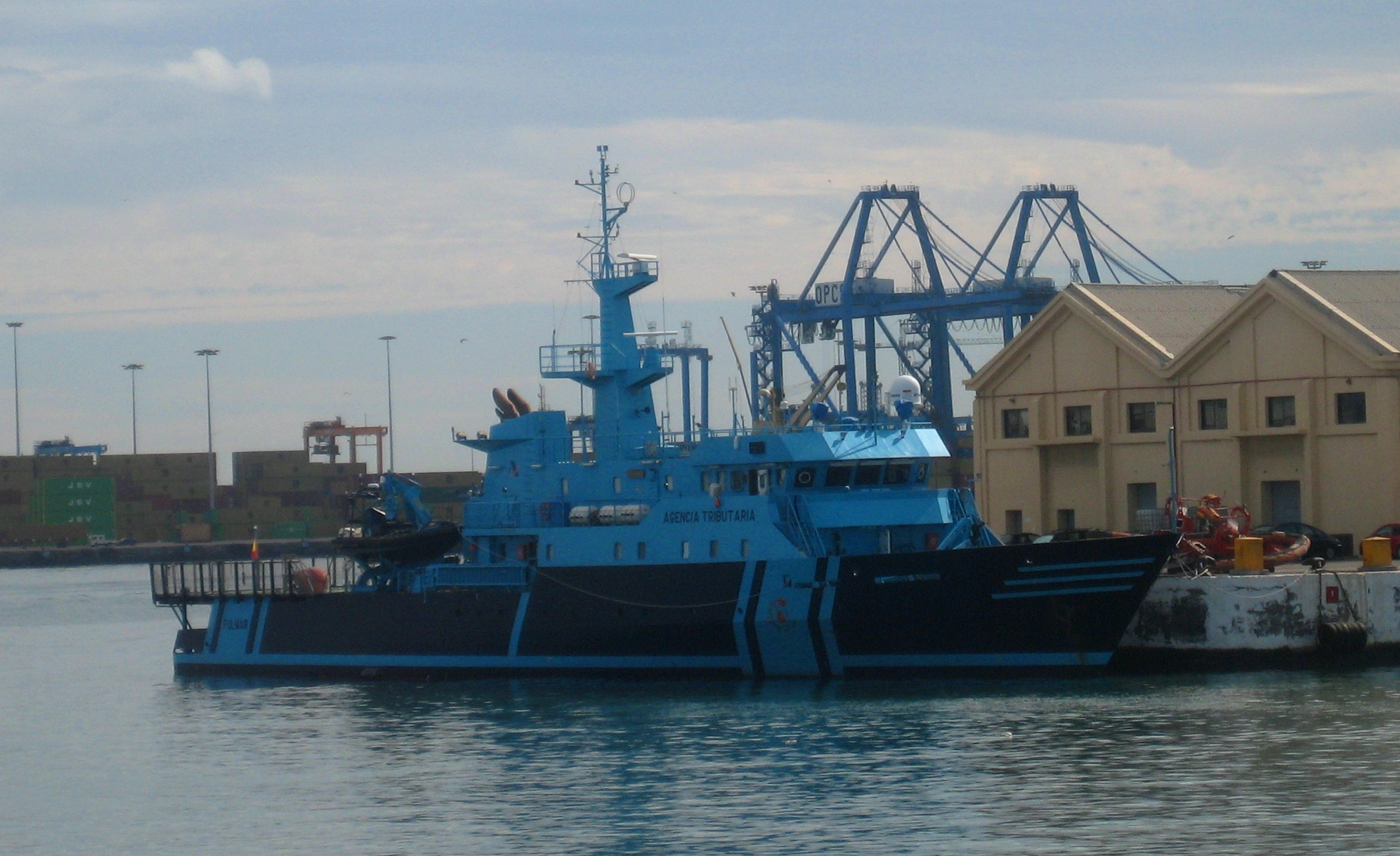
SVA Fulmar-class ship for counter-drug special operations

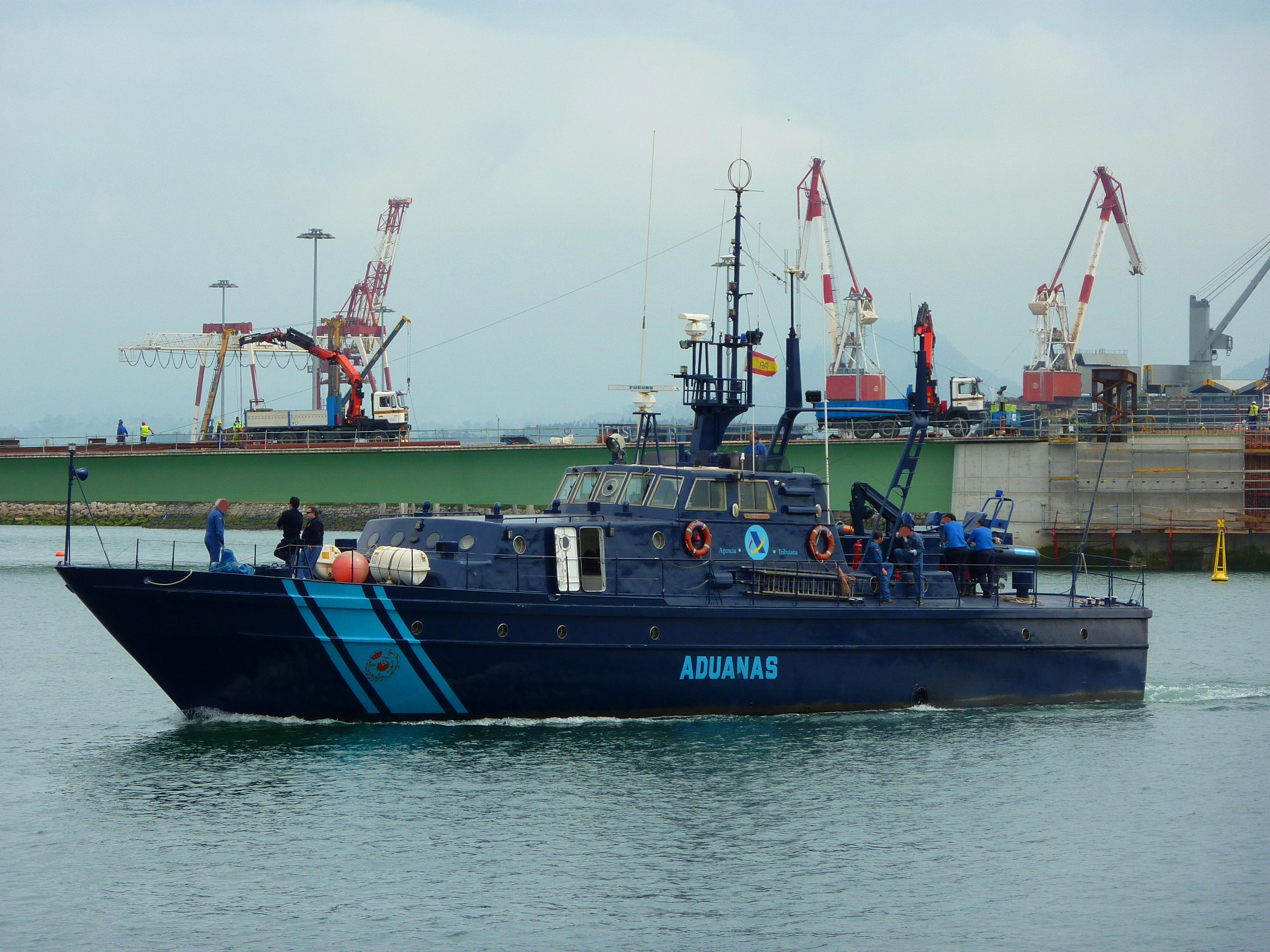
Alcaraván-class patrol ship Alcaraván IV

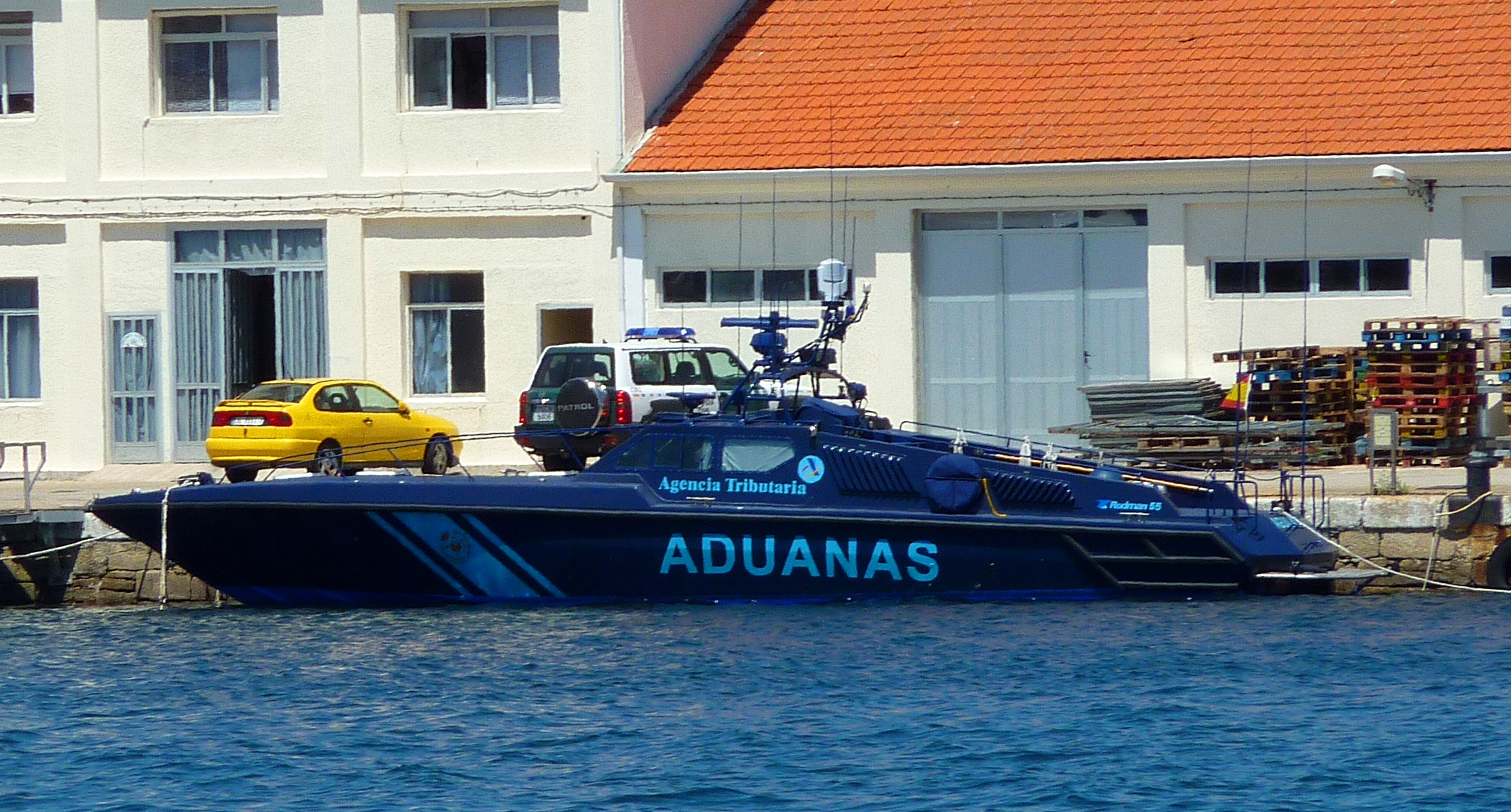
Cormorán-class (Rodman-55HJ) high speed interception boat Águila I

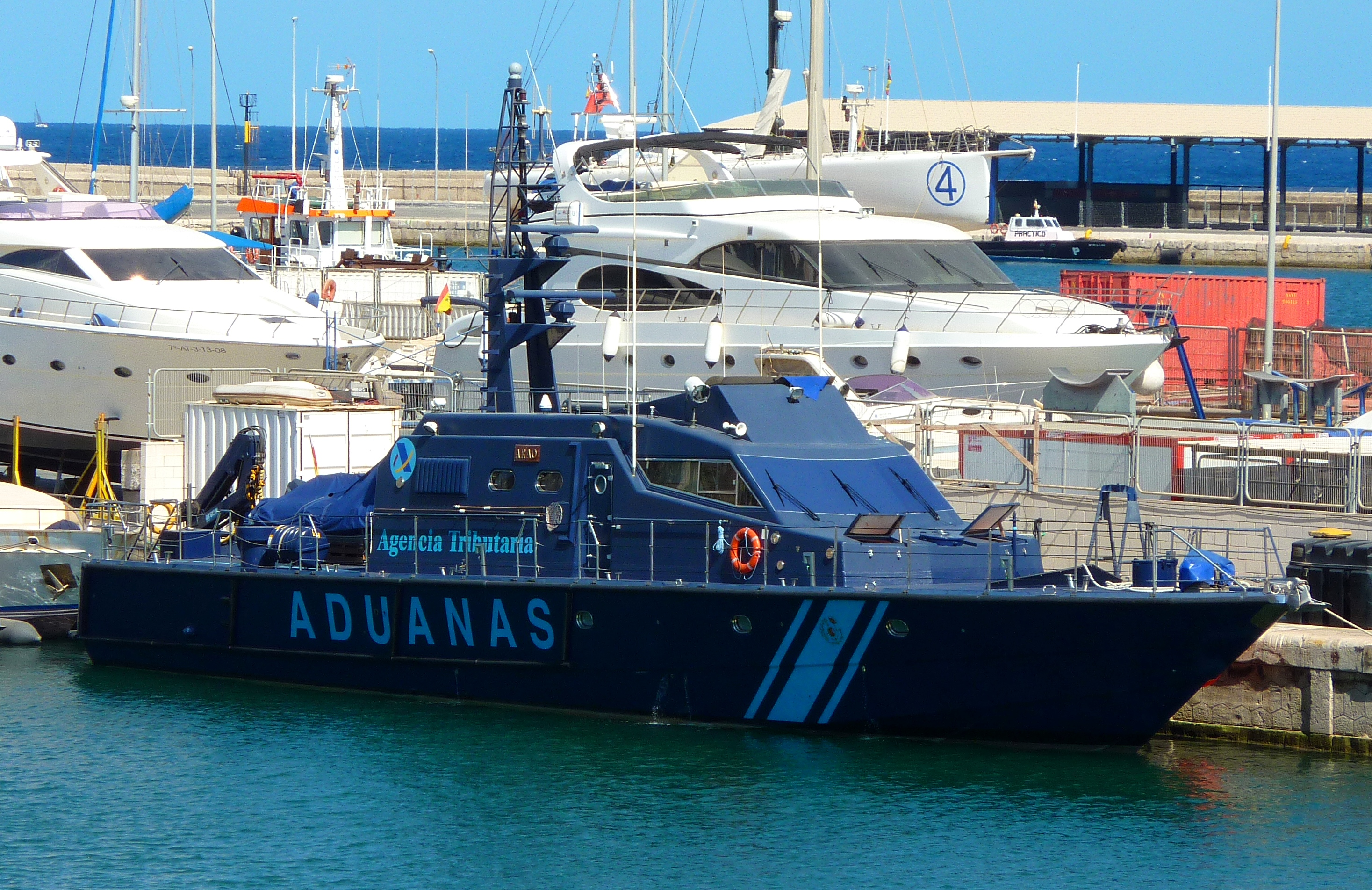
Gerifalte-class (Rodman-101) patrol ship Arao

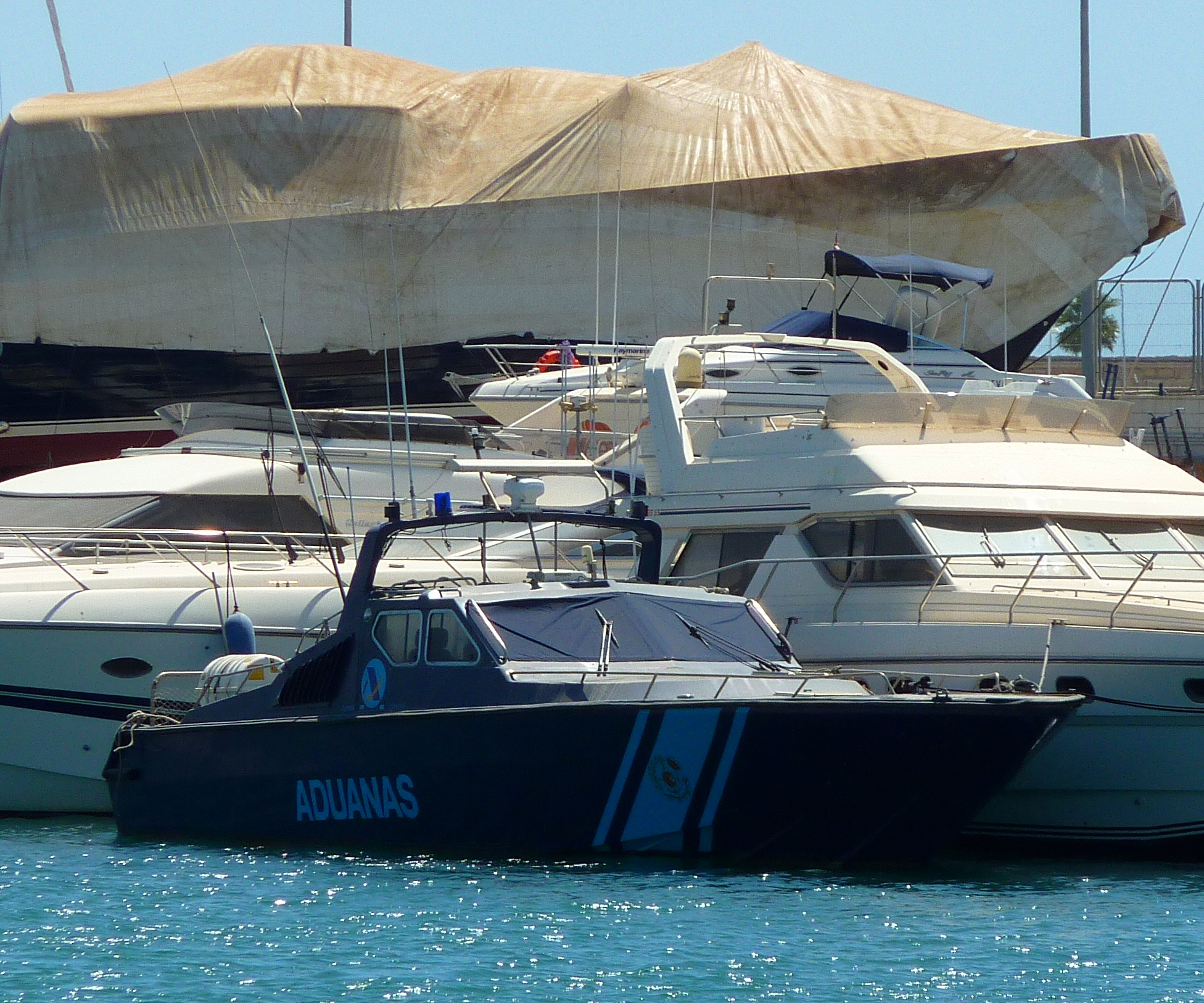
HJ-class high speed interception boat HJ-VII

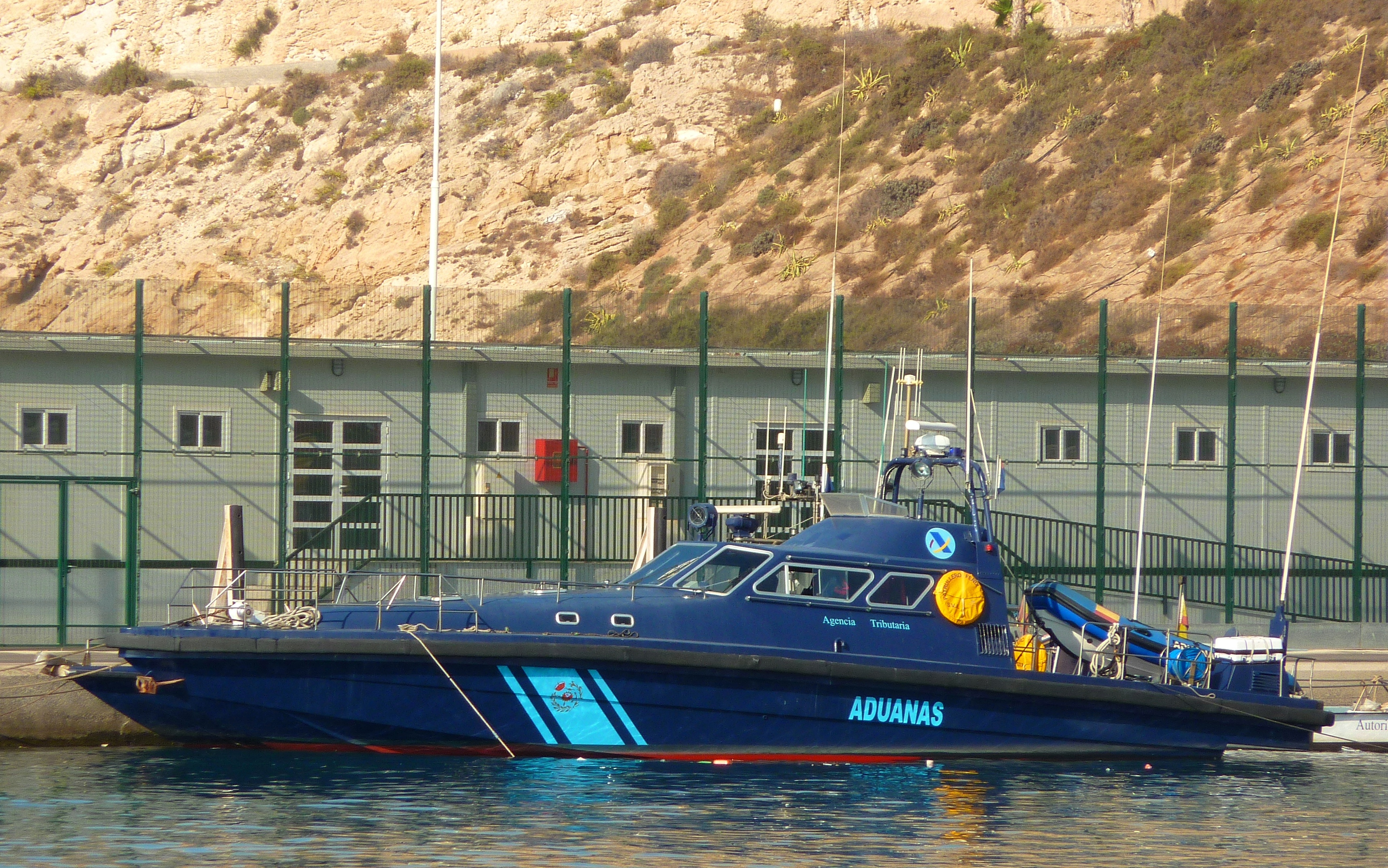
Alcotán-class high speed interception boat Fénix

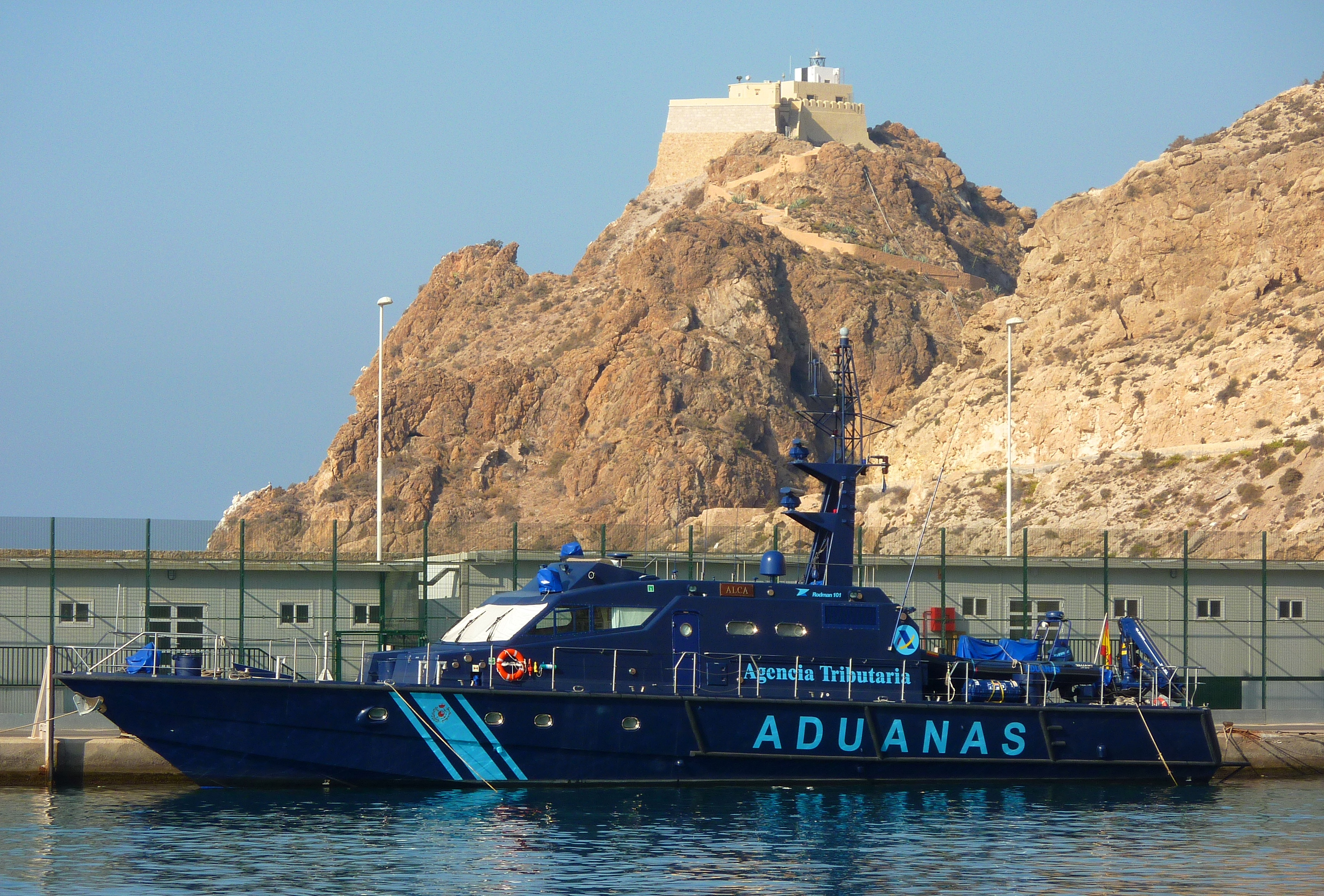
Gerifalte-class patrol ship Alca

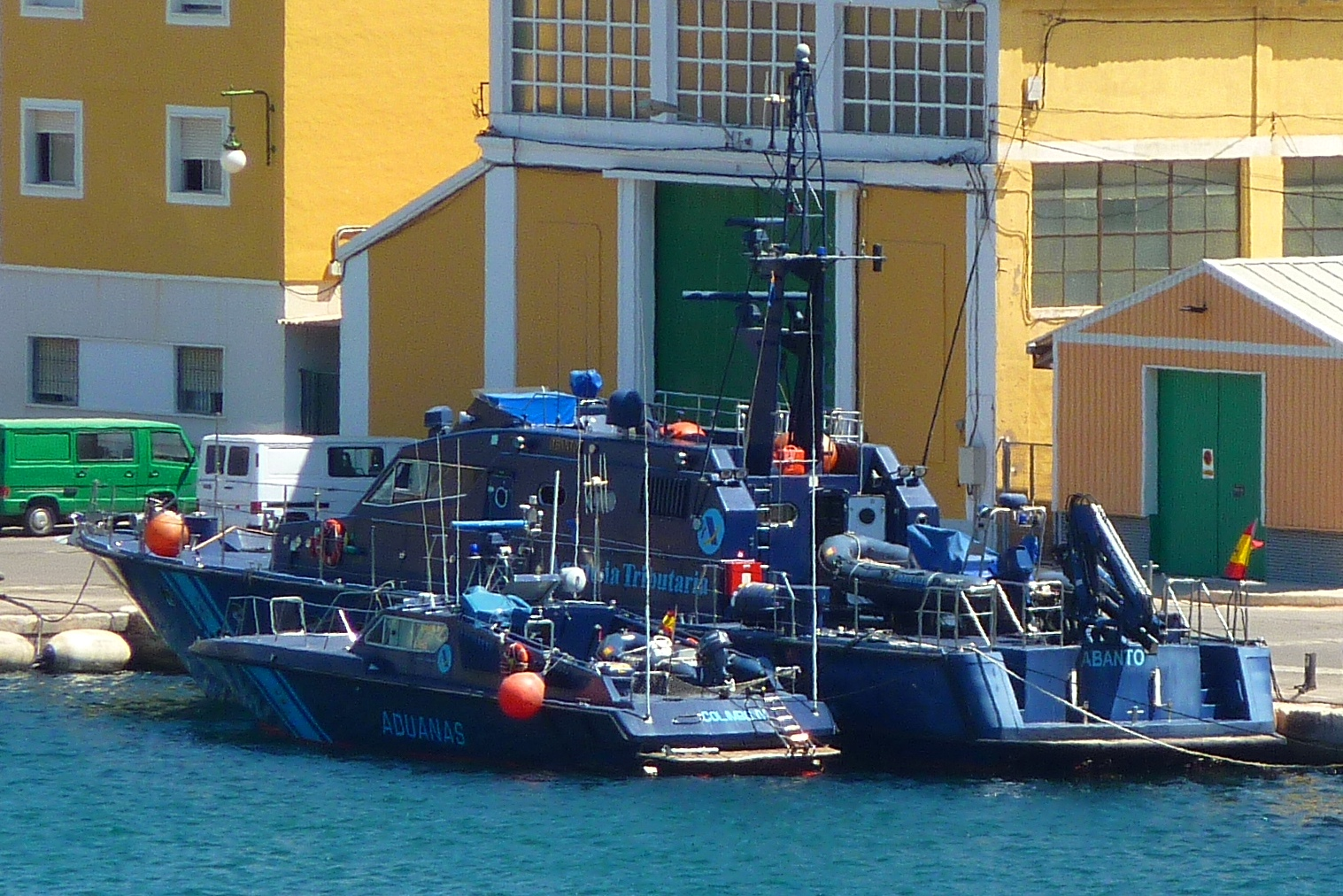
Two SVA patrol vessels at Cartagena Naval Base

== See also ==
- Crime in Spain
