= Ministry of Finance (Spain) =

Government ministry of Spain

- Ministerio de Hacienda

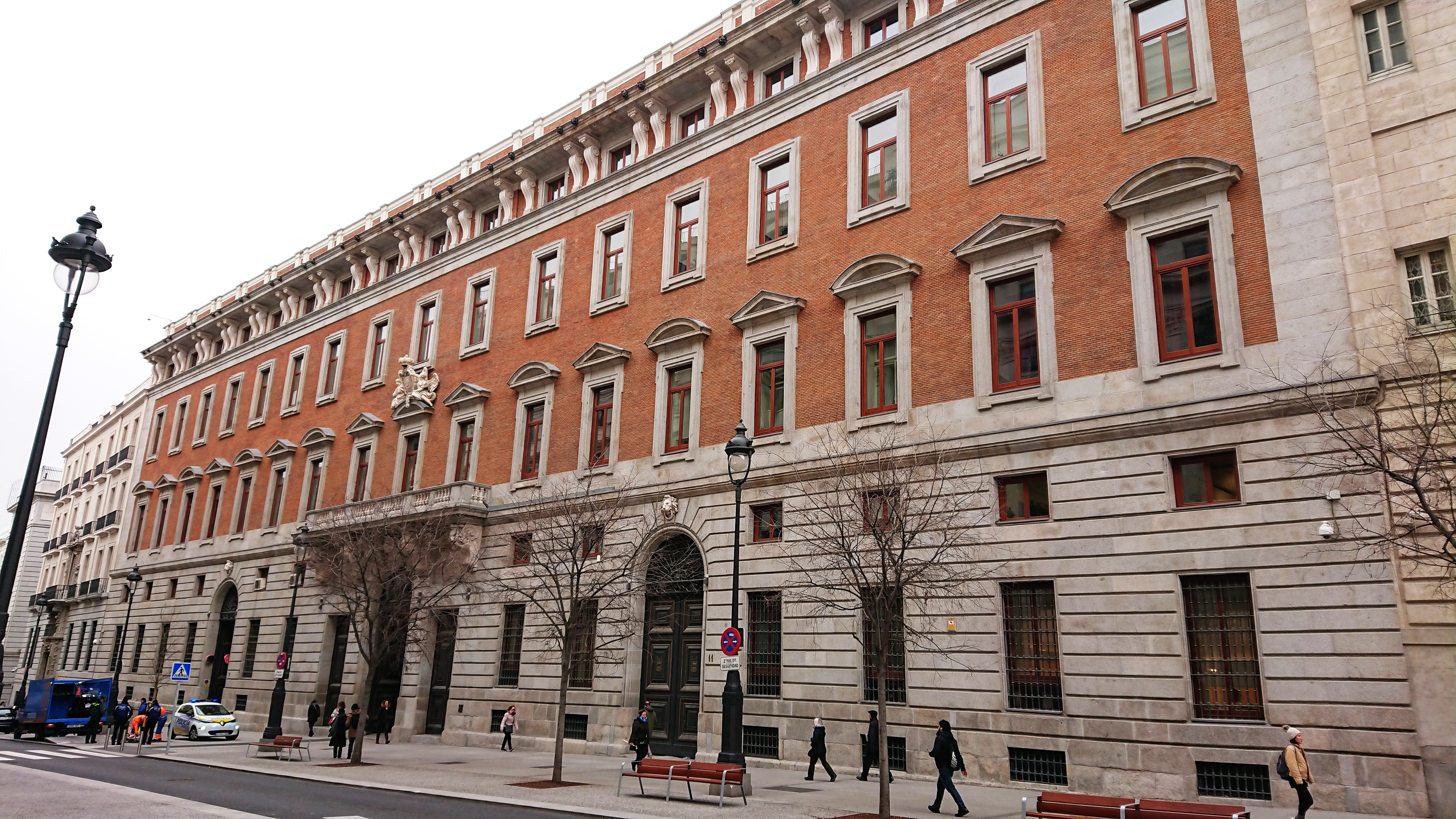
- Main headquarters

Agency overview
- Formed: November 30, 1714; 311 years ago (as Veeduría General)
- Preceding agency: Secretariat of State and of the Office of War and Treasury (1705–1714)
- Type: Ministry
- Jurisdiction: Government of Spain
- Headquarters: Real Casa de la Aduana 5, Calle de Alcalá Madrid
- Employees: 35,507 (2025) (Note: 7,095 ministry employees 27,195 Agencia Tributaria employees 1,217 from other agencies)
- Annual budget: € 19.34 billion, 2026
- Minister responsible: Arcadi España, Minister
- Agency executives: Jesús Gascón Catalán, Secretary of State for Finance; María José Gualda Romero, Secretary of State for Budget and Expenditure; Lidia Sánchez Milán, Under-Secretary; Mercedes Caballero Fernández, Secretary-General for European Funds
- Child agency: Agencia Tributaria
- Website: Official website(in Spanish)

The Ministry of Finance or Ministry of Treasury (Spanish: Ministerio de Hacienda, MH) is the department of the Government of Spain responsible for the design and implementation of the government policy on public finance and budget. It applies and manages the regional and local financing systems and the provision of information on the economic-financial activity of the different Public Administrations.

The Finance Ministry also manages the cadastre and collects all the State taxes through the Spanish Tax Agency as well as controlling most of the state-owned enterprises through the State Company of Industrial Participations (SEPI). Likewise, the MH manages the central government goods, the European funds and the public lottery. However, most of its duties are carried out by autonomous agencies like the Tax Agency and the Royal Mint.

Established in 1714, it succeeded the Secretariat of State and of the Office of War and Treasury in all financial affairs. At this time, it was named Veeduría General and it was headed by a Universal Inspector, who in turn was subordinate to an Inspector-General. It was formally established as a ministerial department in 1720, when it was renamed as Secretariat of State and of the Office of Finance.

Since March 2026, the finance minister has been Arcadi España, who previously served as secretary of state for territorial policy and as regional minister of finance of the Valencian Community.

== History ==
=== Origins ===
Before the arrival of the Bourbon dynasty to the Spanish throne in the early 18th century and the progressive centralization of the public treasury, numerous bodies coexisted in the Spanish crown that had powers over the royal treasury.

==== Castile ====
Until the 18th century, the Spanish Monarchy was a composite monarchy. In Castile, except for the Basque provinces and Navarre, which had special charters, the treasury was unique. In Aragon, each kingdom that made up the Crown possessed its own treasury and institutions.

In the Crown of Castile, from the 15th century onwards, finances were managed by the Contaduría Mayor de Hacienda (roughly translated as the General Accounting Office of the Treasury), composed of chief and junior accountants. When the Cortes met at Madrigal de las Altas Torres in 1476, they established two Contadurias Mayores and, during the reign of the Catholic Monarchs, there were four chief accountants, two for each Contaduría. However, the deficiencies of the Castilian tax system, as well as conflicts with the large cities with voting rights in the Cortes, led King Charles I to create the Council of Finance between 1523 and 1525, as a supreme body responsible for correcting these problems and settling financial disputes.

This Council, highly inefficient in its early years, would eventually assume control of economic and financial policy from 1593 onwards, when new internal rules gave it its own jurisdiction and integrated the chief accountants into its ranks. However, until the arrival of the Bourbons, the Crown's taxing power would remain limited to the will of the Cortes, which continued to play an important role in the approval of new taxes.

Finally, from 1687 onwards, in addition to the Contaduría Mayor and the Council of Finance, there was also the position of Superintendent-General for Finance, a sort of finance minister who oversaw the royal treasury.

==== Aragon, Navarre and the Basque provinces ====
In the Crown of Aragon and its kingdoms, in addition to different taxes, each kingdom had their own fiscal institutions, such as the General Deputations, the bailes, and the maestres racionales. Furthermore, it is worth noting that the Aragonese kingdoms rarely had common institutions, and it wasn't until the reign of the Catholic Monarchs that any appeared.

As for the Kingdom of Navarre and the three Basque provinces (Álava, Gipuzkoa, and Biscay), all of them had their own institutions (such as the Deputation of the Kingdom of Navarre or the General Assemblies) which, unlike those in Aragon, were preserved beyond the 18th century due to their loyalty to the new monarch during the War of the Spanish Succession. It is also important to understand that these territories were incorporated into the Crown of Castile and did not form a separate entity, although they retained their own institutions and privileges due to their special characteristics and relationship with the Crown. This meant that if the king needed resources from these territories in the north of the Iberian Peninsula, he had to request them from each of their respective Cortes (parliaments), in a procedure similar to that used before the Cortes of Castile.

=== Eighteenth century ===
Following the war of succession that consolidated Philip V on the Spanish throne, he approved a series of decrees, called Nueva Planta decrees, which, as punishment, suppressed the institutions of the kingdoms of the Crown of Aragon and their powers were assumed by the Castilian institutions, namely: Council of Finance, Contaduría Mayor de Hacienda and Superintendent-General for Finance.

The sovereign's first measures were to establish in Spain a system similar to the French one, with a cabinet of ministers and administrative departments for each branch of government. In 1705 he divided the unique Secretariat of Universal Office in two, one secretariat in charge of War and Finance matters and another "for everything else". This division lasted until the final moments of the war, when the monarch further specialized the government and created the five original ministries of Spain: State, Justice, War, Navy and the Indies, and Finance. The Finance Department was not initially referred as a "Secretariat of State and of the Office" like the other four, but the Veeduría General (roughly in English: Inspectorate-General) and headed by the Universal Inspector of the Inspectorate-General (Spanish: Intendente Universal de la Veeduría General), the primitive denomination of the current position of Minister of Finance. Jean Orry served as inspector-general from 1714 to 1715.

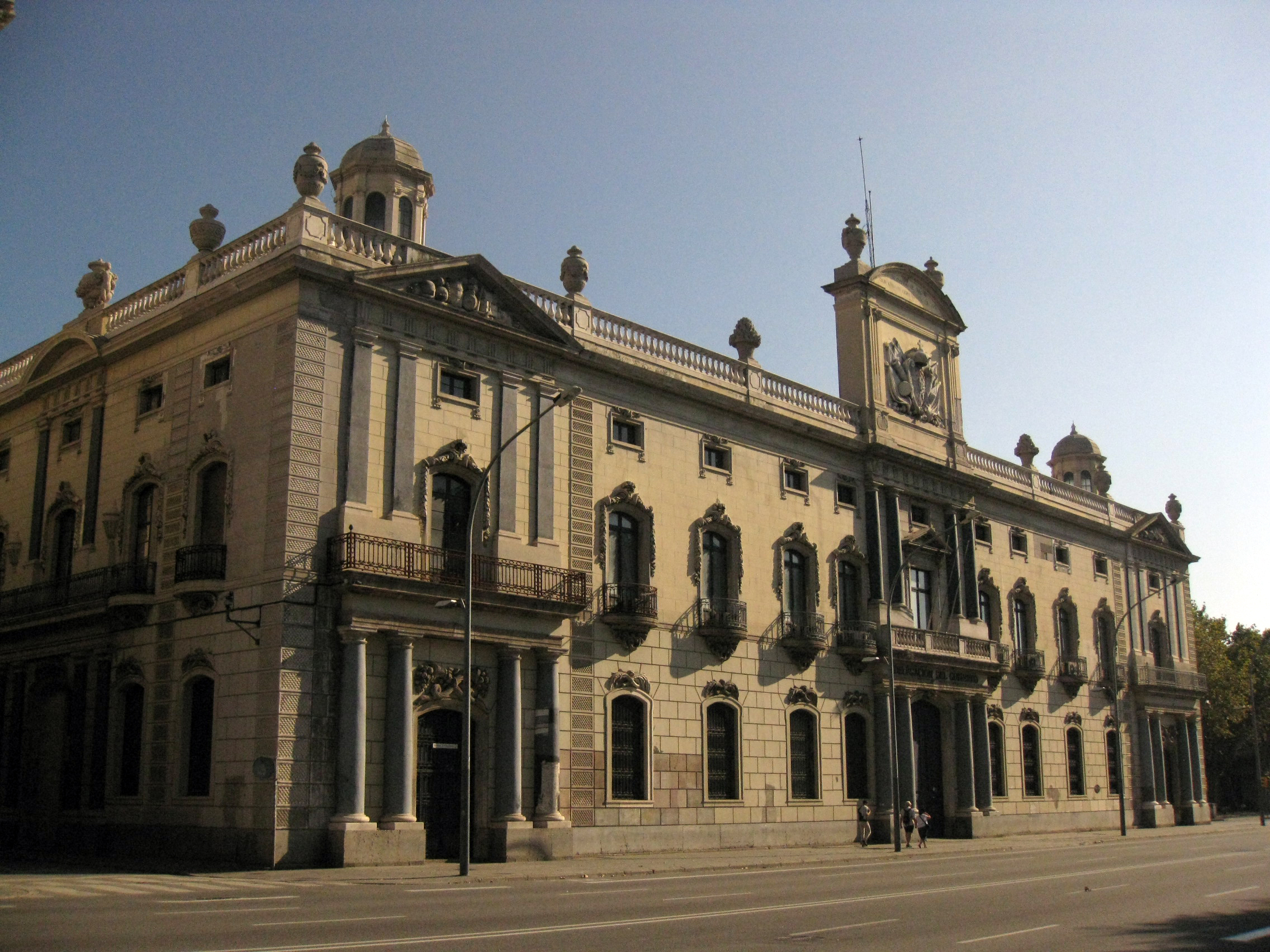
The Customs Building in Barcelona, current Government Sub-delegation headquarters.

Following Orry's dismissal, the king abolished the Veeduria General and transferred its responsibilities to the Justice Secretariat until 1720, when financial affairs were again separated and given their own State Secretariat. Juan de Dios y Río González, 1st Marquess of Campoflorido and former Governor of the Finance Council, served as Secretary of State and of the Office of Finance.

During the reign of Ferdinand VI, a long process of recovery of the direct administration of the main revenues and taxes began, reconstituting the assets of the public treasury. Also, at the end of his reign, between 1754 and 1755, the king implemented a series of administrative reforms that sought to clarify the regulations of the administration and that established what the specific functions of each ministry were.

With the royal decree of 1754, a truly bureaucratic administration for the treasury was created. The State Secretariat, as the governing body, coexisted with the agencies inherited from the Habsburg monarchy. Of all of them, the one that stood out as second in importance was the General Superintendency of the Royal Treasury, the body to which the Directorate for General Revenues depended—the body that administered the Crown's most productive revenues: customs duties and those derived from the royal monopolies of tobacco, salt and lead, among others.

All these departments maintained a certain independence from each other, to the point that the directorates-general functioned as today autonomous bodies do. and an organic subordination barely existed. To avoid conflicts of competence that could arise between the Secretary of State of Finance and the Superintendency of the Treasury, they were resolved by making the holder of both were the same person: the Secretary of State. However, they were strong organs and a good proof of this was the construction in the main cities of the Kingdom of palaces destined to house their employees. This is the reason for the current existence of customs buildings in Valencia—today High Court of Justice of the Valencian Community—, Barcelona, Málaga (today Museum of Malaga) and in Madrid—current headquarters of the Ministry—. All of them were architectural projects of great importance undertaken during the reigns of Ferdinand VI, Charles III and Charles IV.

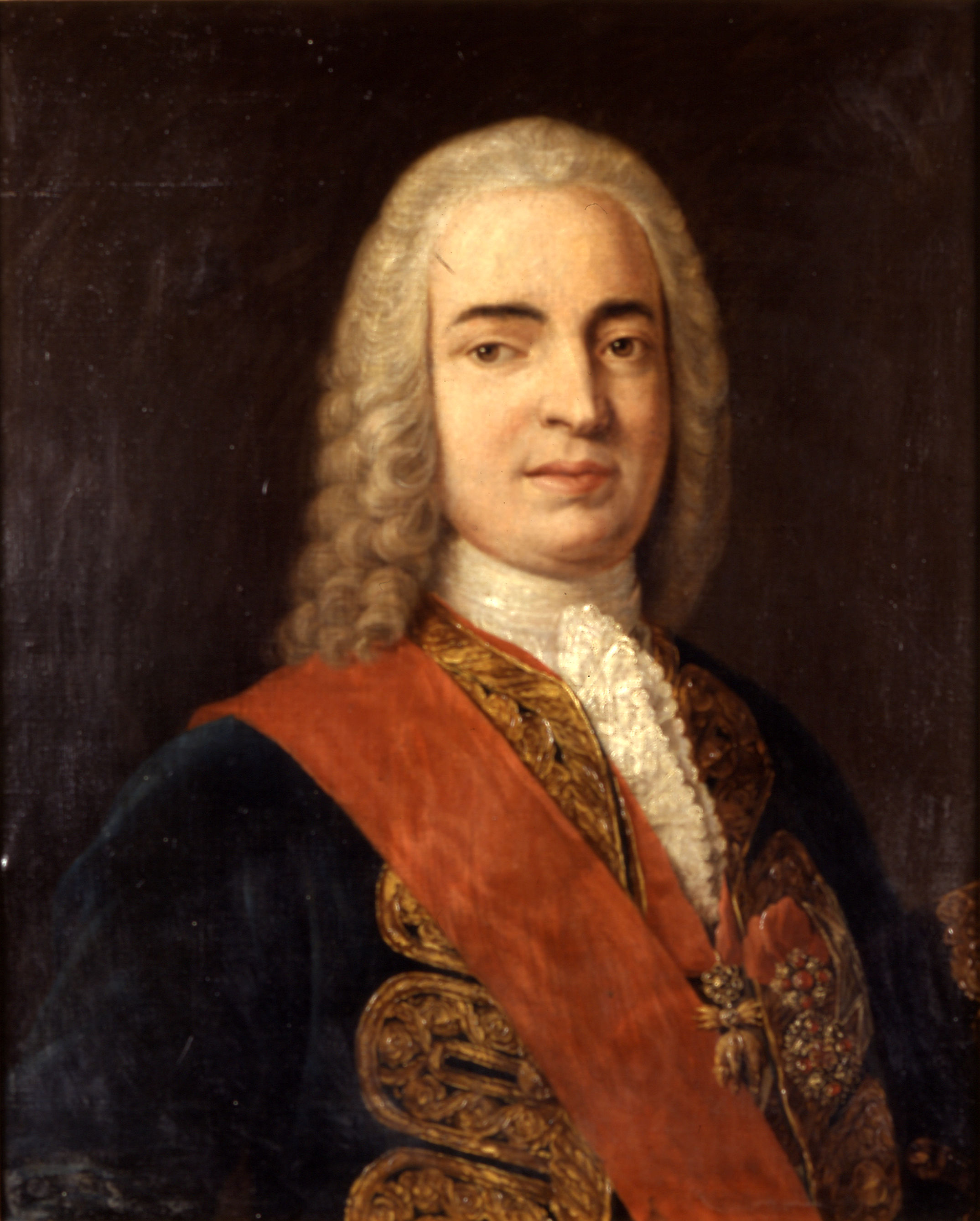
The Marquess of Ensenada, Treasury Minister between 1743 and 1754.

==== A single tax ====
Since 1754, the Directorate for General Revenues was defined as the body in charge of controlling the main taxes and existing revenues: fundamentally, these were tariffs and provincial taxes. From within this Directorate, promoted by The Marquess of the Ensenada, Secretary of State for the Treasury, took place the creation of a general cadastre for Castile aimed at reducing the many indirect taxes and few direct contributions to a single tax (Spanish: Única Contribución), which had previously been created in the territories of the old Crown of Aragon during the reign of Philip V. Although the project failed, a whole program to be followed by the subsequent owners of the portfolio was established.

==== Finances of the Indies ====
Three decades later, in 1787, new changes arrived. On the one hand, The Count of Floridablanca attempted to centralize the government apparatus by creating the Supreme State Board (Spanish: Junta Suprema de Estado, similar to a council of ministers), which would later lead to his downfall after this body generated numerous detractors, such as the Count of Aranda, a staunch defender of the Polysynodial System. During this period, the practice arose of submitting the reports and draft decrees of the Secretary of the Treasury, first to the Junta and, after its dissolution, to the Council of State.

At the same time, the ministries were reformed again, dividing the Secretariat of the Indies in two and creating by Royal Decree of 8 July 1787 a Secretariat of State and of the Office of Grace and Justice of the Indies and a Secretariat of State and of the Office of War, Finance, Trade and Navigation of the Indies. Despite the intention, this reform failed to solve the problems it sought to address. This, coupled with the economic crisis that developed during the reign of Charles IV, exacerbated by the political instability in Europe following the French Revolution, led to the approval of Royal Decree of 25 April 1790, reinstating the traditional division into five Secretariats of State and the Dispatch (State, War, Navy, Finance, and Grace and Justice), each of which was assigned the matters pertaining to the Indies. Imperial tax matters were reincorporated into the peninsular Secretariat and from that moment until 1836, except for specific periods, there were two tax areas within the same Department: Spain and the Indies.

=== Nineteenth century ===
In 1793 began a continuous period of wars that did not end until 1845 and the main resource that sustained them was the public debt that did not stop growing and that had, among other consequences, the creation of the Bank of Spain, the implementation of everal confiscation policies and the creation of a budgetary system to control the deficit. In 1795 the Superintendency of the Treasury was suppressed assuming its responsibilities the ministry. Between the Peninsular War (1808-1814), it existed two treasury ministries, one belonging to the Napoleonic government of Joseph Bonaparte and other to the Spanish one.

For a better organization, in 1824, during the reign of Ferdinand VII, it was created the Directorate-General for the Treasury—that still exists today—as a redistributive body of public funds and in 1834 the current Undersecretariat of Finance was created with multiple bodies depending on it. This last reform was important because it was the moment when the Councils were suppressed and the Courts of Justice was created. In 1836, the administration continued growing and the Directorate-General for Confiscated Properties was created—direct predecessor of the current Directorate-General for State Assets—and the Treasury Offices for the Indies are suppressed.

==== Tax reform ====
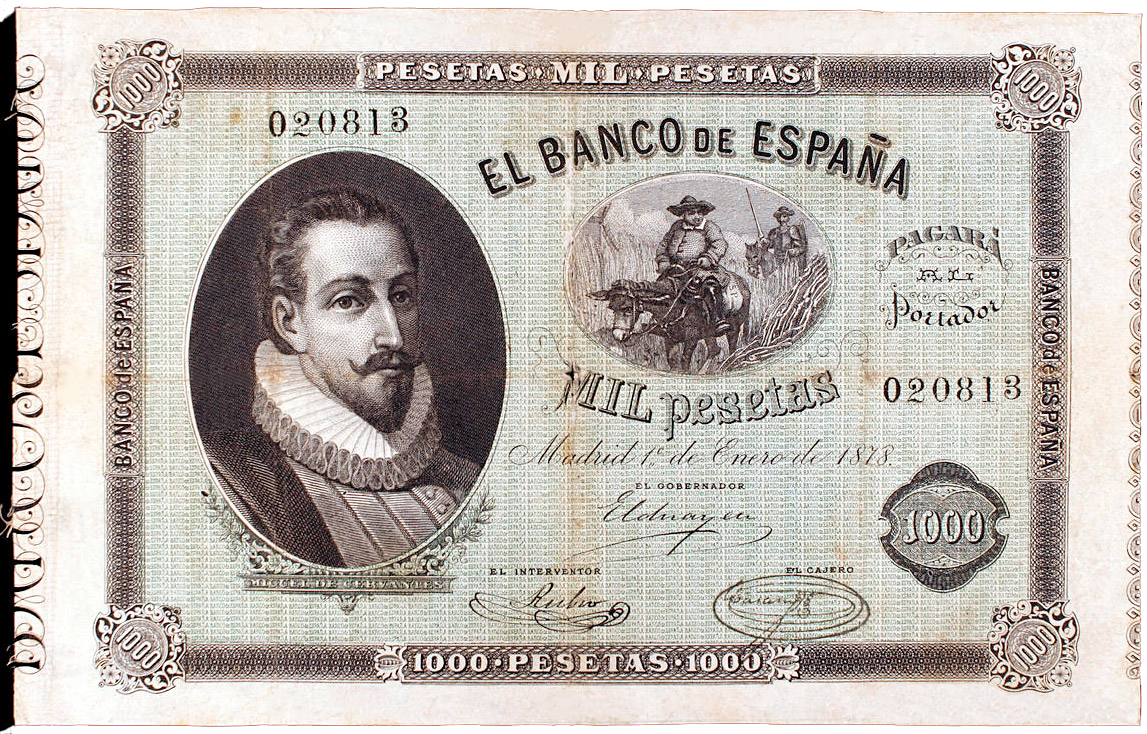
During the reign of Isabella II the peseta began to gain importance, but it was not until her overthrow in 1868 that the provisional government made it legal tender.

The unstoppable constitutionalist process that took place during the reign of Isabella II imperatively needed a sound public finances as a basic instrument to create wealth and provide political stability to the rising bourgeoisie. With the rise to power of the moderate party took place the tax reform of 1845, due to the decided personal push of the Secretary of State and the Dispatch of the Treasury, Alejandro Mon. This tax reform meant the end of the complex tax system of the Ancien Régime through a strong simplification that for the first time gave importance to direct taxes and reduced indirect taxes, a reform that today is considered the beginning of the modern Treasury. It was also at this time that the Ministry acquired the current name.

The minister Mon reform implied a new organic structure, to adapt its machinery to the new circumstances. It also involved the transfer of the Department to its current headquarters: the building of the Real Casa de la Aduana. This responded to the need to centralize and group in the same place both the Secretariat and the Directorates-General for Taxes and the Treasury, which, as noted above, enjoyed a high degree of autonomy from the Ministry.

If Mon was the creator of a contemporary treasury from the point of view of the technique and tax law, Bravo Murillo, head of the Treasury in 1849 and in 1850, designed the Treasury as a fundamental pillar of the General State Administration. In fact, under the term of Bravo Murillo, the Accounting Act of 1850 was passed. He consecrated the term «Ministry» to replace the classic one of «Secretary of State and of the Dispatch» and he organized the Department under a modern bureaucratic pattern. With him, the authority of the Minister on the directors general was reinforced and the directorates-general for Direct and Indirect Taxes, for Accounting—predecessor of the current Office of the Comptroller General of the State Administration—, for the Debt and also for the Contentious—predecessor of the current Solicitor General—were consecrated like classic organs of the Public Treasury, Besides that, Bravo Murillo also promoted the creation of the General Deposit Fund, an instrument initially designed to rid the State of the dependence on banks when it comes to obtaining new loans. But in the end it did not have the expected effects.

The development of the country and the need to remove it definitively from the financial crises that took place during the 19th century led to new economic and tributary reforms carried out by the ministers Laureano Figuerola (1869), Navarro Reverter (1895) and Raimundo Fernández Villaverde (1902-1903). This, together with the culmination of the codifying process in Spain, influenced new organic reforms of the Public Treasury and the beginning of the consolidation of a new bureaucratic structure.

Between 1873 and 1878 the Office of the Comptroller General (the internal supervisory agency of the state public sector) was institutionalized. In 1881 the State Solicitors Corps was created coinciding with the consecration of the economic-administrative procedure. The same year, it was created the Inspectorate-General of the Treasury as an instrument to improve provincial economic management. The immediate effect was the creation of the Treasury Delegations in the provinces.

=== Twentieth century ===
Between 1902 and 1903 a suitable administrative structure was adopted for the tax reform planned by Fernández Villaverde. In addition, each directorate-general was regulated by a specific regulation of its own. In 1906, with the approval of the Parcel Property Cadastre Act, promoted by Minister Moret and assisted by José Echegaray as Chairman of the Committee in charge of drafting the draft bill, progress will be made in consolidating a system of direct taxes. In 1911, the Treasury Administration and Accounting Act was approved, the backbone of the entire system of budgetary control and public expenditure.

This administrative structure remained practically unchanged until 1957. During this period, the abolition of the Ministry of Treasury between 1923 and 1925 deserves special mention, due to the structure implemented by the Military Directorate presided over by Primo de Rivera.

During the Second Spanish Republic, different organic reforms were also undertaken, among which the creation of the Central Economic-Administrative Court stands out. However, all this period is opaqued by the tragedy of the Spanish Civil War from 1936 to 1939. The Civil War provokes the creation on each side of the conflicts its own treasury departments: in the republican side, the Ministry of Finance and Economy and in the rebellious side the Finance Commission, later transformed in 1938 in the Ministry of Finance. After the war, the Francoist regime established an autarky system that was suppressed in the late 1950s.

In 1957 a new tax reform was carried out and opened the way to raise the national income and remove the country definitively from the economic situation that followed the Civil War. This reform needed a modern, simplified and efficient Treasury. In 1959 an Undersecretariat for the Treasury and Public Expenses was created in charge of the control of the financial resources of the State and of the preparation of the Budgets. It was the moment in which the mechanization of processes in administration is introduced, the embryo of tax informatics. Study and tax information services were strengthened during this period.

As a result of the 1959 Stabilization Plan promoted by Minister Mariano Navarro Rubio, between 1963 and 1964 the process of tax reform culminated with the approval of the General Tax Act and Tax System Reform Act. New taxes were systematized (on income and on business traffic). This implied above all a reform of the technical bodies of the Treasury in order to specialize them even more in the new tax system. The economic austerity plan of 1967 led to new reforms, simplifying the structure of the Ministry when the Undersecretary for Treasury and Public Expenditure was abolished.

==== 1978 Constitution ====
The late 1970s Taxation Reform Plans, the approval of the General Budgetary Act and the approval of the Urgent Measures for Fiscal Reform Act, both in 1977, prepared the ground for the Constitution of 1978.

In the years following the approval of the Constitution, the Ministry of Finance began to take shape as we know it today. Through Royal Decree-Law 22/1982, of December 7, on Urgent Measures for Administrative Reforms, the Departments of Economy and Finance were merged, creating the Secretariat of State for Finance as the central body of the public treasury. In 1987, the Directorate General for Personnel Costs was founded.

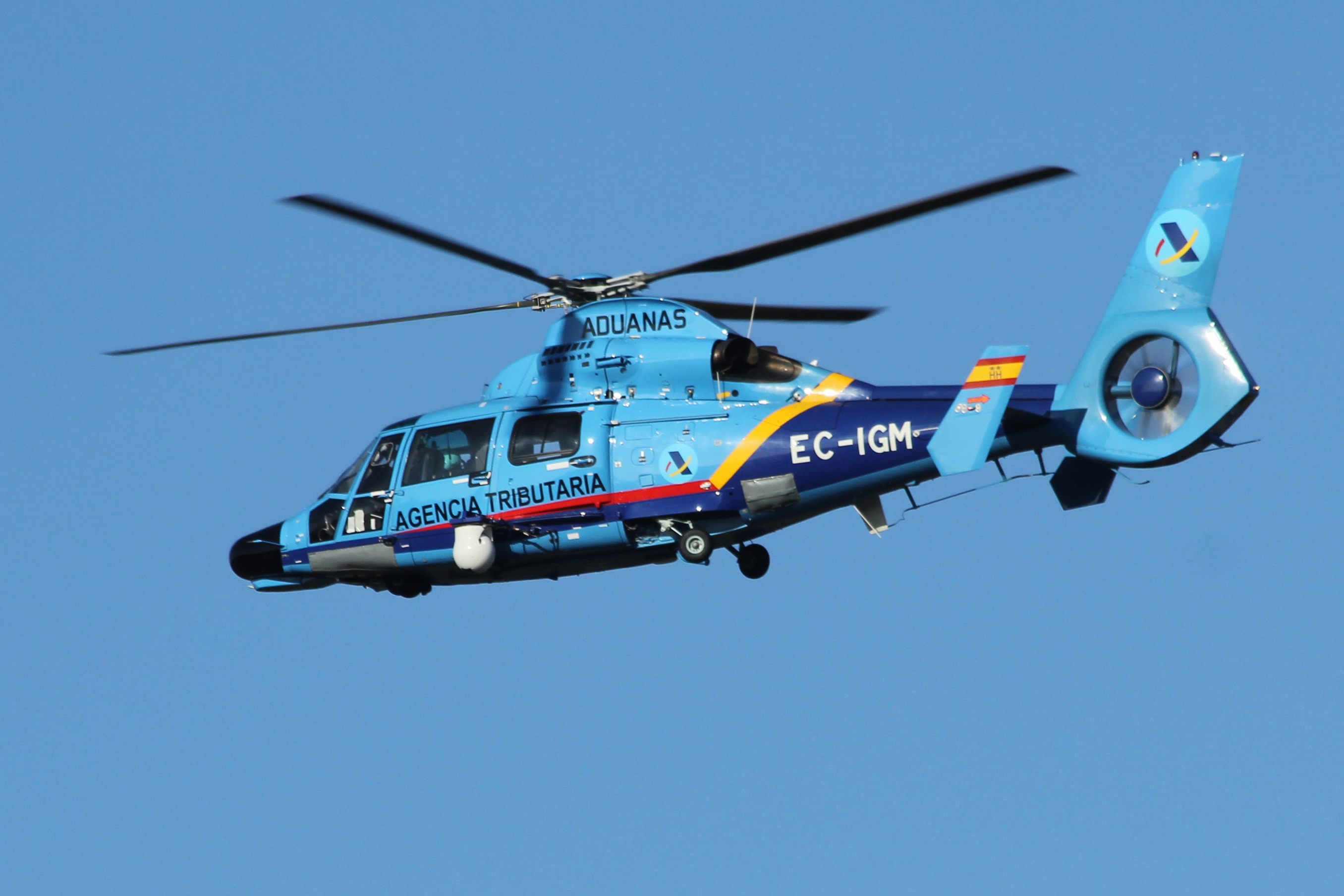
One of the Ministry's missions is customs control, which it exercises through its own police force, the Customs Surveillance Service (SVA), integrated into the Tax Agency

In 1992, the Spanish Tax Agency was created, an autonomous body within the Ministry of Finance responsible for the effective implementation of the tax and customs system and for managing the State tax and customs system, as well as the resources of other national and European Union public administrations and entities.

Four years later, in 1996, the budgetary responsibilities were equated with the financial ones, creating the Secretariat of State for Budget and Expenditure.

=== Present ===
On 1 January 1999, the Eurozone was created with the establishment of the single European currency, the euro (€), and the process concluded on 31 December 2001, when the peseta (₧) ceased to be legal tender in Spain after more than 130 years. Since then, monetary policy has been governed by the Eurosystem, headed by the European Central Bank (ECB) and the governors of the national central banks of the Eurozone.

After a brief period between 2000 and 2004, the Ministry of Finance was merged again with the Ministry of Economy, once more forming the Ministry of Economy and Finance. As a result of this merger, when the departments were divided in 2011, responsibility for the Public Treasury was transferred to the Ministry of Economy, where it remains today.

==== 2008 financial crisis reforms ====
In late 2011, new prime minister Mariano Rajoy abolished the Ministry of Public Administrations and the Finance portfolio assumed its responsibilities. At the same time, the ministries of finance and economy were split once more.

With all financial and administrative powers concentrated in a single department and with Cristóbal Montoro once again at the helm, this Ministry was responsible for implementing some of the main measures to address the economic crisis, three of which stand out:

1. The first of these was to conclude the process initiated during the premiership of José Luis Rodríguez Zapatero with the amendment of Article 135 of the Constitution. This amendment, which included the concept of "budgetary stability" in the Constitution and gave priority to debt repayment (balanced budget amendment), was complemented by the approval in April 2012 of the Organic Law on Budgetary Stability and Financial Sustainability.
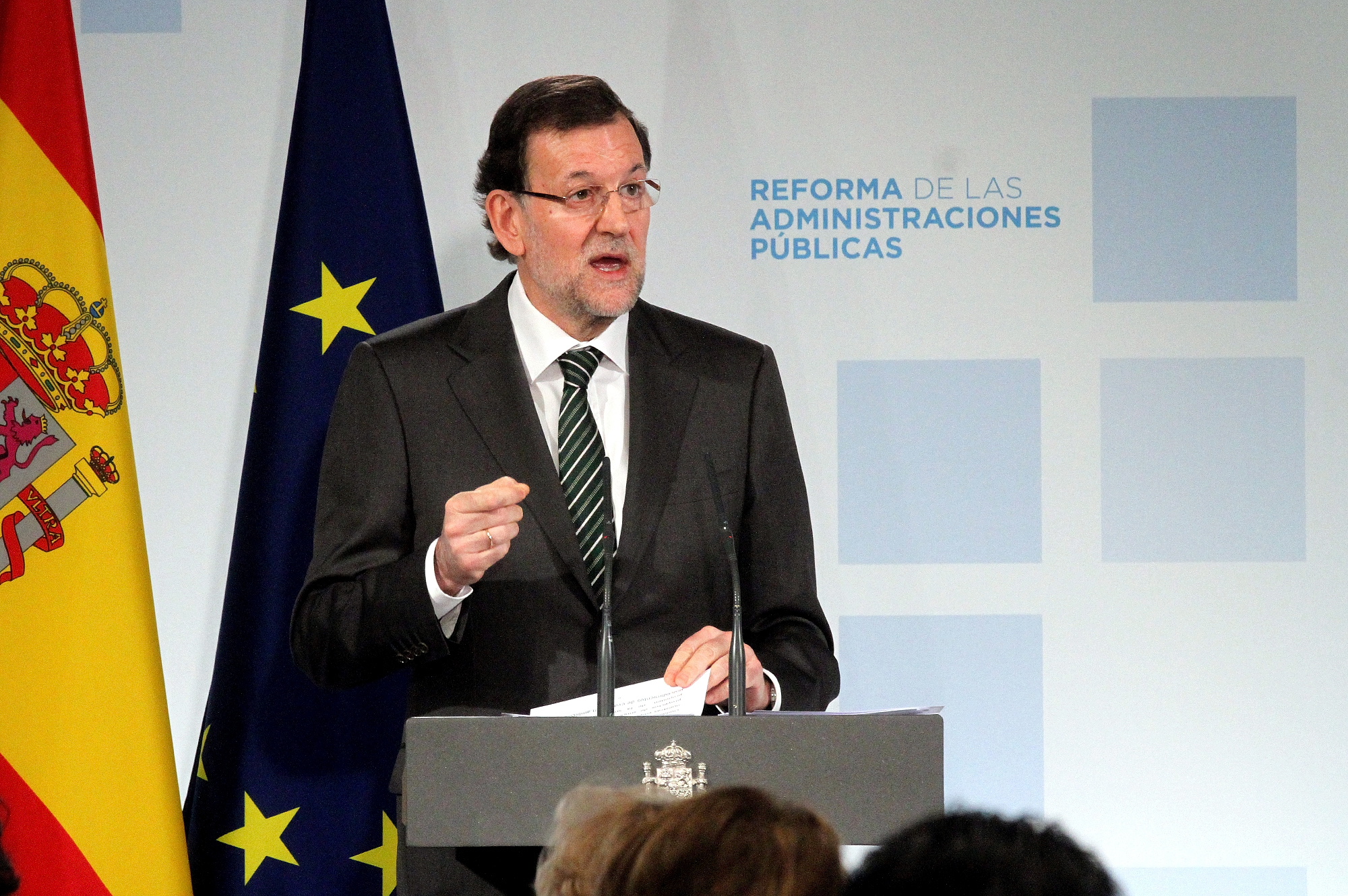
2. Prime Minister Rajoy presenting the CORA Report in 2013
  The second one—in coordination with the Ministry of the Presidency—was the creation, by the Council of Ministers, of the Commission for the Reform of Public Administrations (CORA) in October 2012, which led to the approval, among other regulations, of Law 15/2014, of September 16, on the rationalization of the Public Sector and other administrative reform measures, which eliminated, reformed and merged numerous bodies, simplified procedures and strengthened control over the Administration's bank accounts and official vehicles.
3. Thirdly, in mid-2012 the Government created the Autonomous Liquidity Fund (FLA), which was initially endowed with €18 billion to help the autonomous communities find liquidity. Subsequently, from 2015 onwards, the FLA was integrated into the new Fund for Autonomous Communities Financing, which, together with the Fund for Local Entities Financing, are the two main mechanisms that the central government has to guarantee the financial sustainability of the rest of the administrations.

==== Recent times ====
In 2016, the Finance Ministry lost the authority for relations with the rest of the Public Administrations in favor of the Ministry of the Presidency, but maintained those related to the Civil Service, thus being renamed as the "Ministry of Finance and Civil Service". Subsequently, following the 2018 vote of no confidence in the government of Mariano Rajoy and the formation of the first government of Pedro Sánchez in June 2018, the Ministry's responsibilities over civil service were transferred to the Ministry of Territorial Policy, although it briefly regained them between 2021 and 2023.

In 2020, the Ministry lost its powers over gambling regulation and civil service pensions, in favor of the ministries of Consumer Affairs and of Inclusion, Social Security and Migration, respectively. That same year, due to the COVID-19 pandemic and the subsequent response from the European Union, which established a recovery fund, the Department adapted its structure for better management of European funds, creating bodies such as the Directorate-General for the Recovery and Resilience Plan and Mechanism or a General Secretariat for European Funds to supervise both the aforementioned directorate-general and the Directorate-General for European Funds.

== Organization ==
Organizational chart Spanish Ministry of Finance, February 2024

The head of the department is the Minister of Finance. The minister sets the general policy and is assisted by two secretaries of state, one for financial affairs and the other for budgetary matters.

The Ministry also has an under-secretary for the day-to-day management of the department and a secretary-general, with the rank of under-secretary, for the management of European funds.

The Ministry of Finance is organised as follows:

Ministry Organization (2025)
Minister	Cabinet (Chief of Staff)
Minister	State Company for Industrial Investments (SEPI)
Secretary of State for Finance	General Secretariat for Regional and Local Financing
Secretary of State for Finance	Directorate-General for Budgetary Stability and Territorial Financial Management
Secretary of State for Finance	Directorate-General for Taxes
Secretary of State for Finance	Directorate-General for the Cadastre
Secretary of State for Finance	Central Economic-Administrative Court
Secretary of State for Finance	Spanish Tax Agency (AEAT)
Secretary of State for Finance	Customs Surveillance Service (SVA)
Secretary of State for Finance	Institute for Fiscal Studies (IEF)
Secretary of State for Budget and Expenditure	Directorate-General for Budget
Secretary of State for Budget and Expenditure	Directorate-General for Personnel Costs
Secretary of State for Budget and Expenditure	Office of the Comptroller General of the State Administration (IGAE)
Secretary of State for Budget and Expenditure	Deputy Directorate-General for Economic Analysis and Programming
Under-Secretary	Technical General Secretariat
Under-Secretary	Directorate-General for State Assets
Under-Secretary	State Lottery and Gambling Company (SELAE)
Under-Secretary	Inspectorate-General
Under-Secretary	Directorate-General for Rationalisation and Centralisation of Procurement
Under-Secretary	Budget Office
Under-Secretary	Department for Services and Territorial Coordination
Under-Secretary	Deputy Directorate-General for Human Resources
Under-Secretary	Administrative Office
Under-Secretary	Deputy Directorate-General for ICT
Under-Secretary	Deputy Directorate-General for Financial Management and General Affairs
Under-Secretary	Deputy Directorate-General for Territorial Coordination and Non-Tax Collection
Under-Secretary	Commission for the Tobacco Market (CMT)
Under-Secretary	Royal Mint of Spain (FNMT-RCM)
Under-Secretary	State Vehicle Fleet (PME)
Secretary-General for European Funds	Directorate-General for European Funds
Secretary-General for European Funds	Directorate-General for the Recovery and Resilience Plan and Facility

The Independent Authority for Fiscal Responsibility (AIReF) and the Independent Office for Regulation and Supervision of Public Procurement (OIReScon) is linked to the Government through this department.

== Headquarters ==
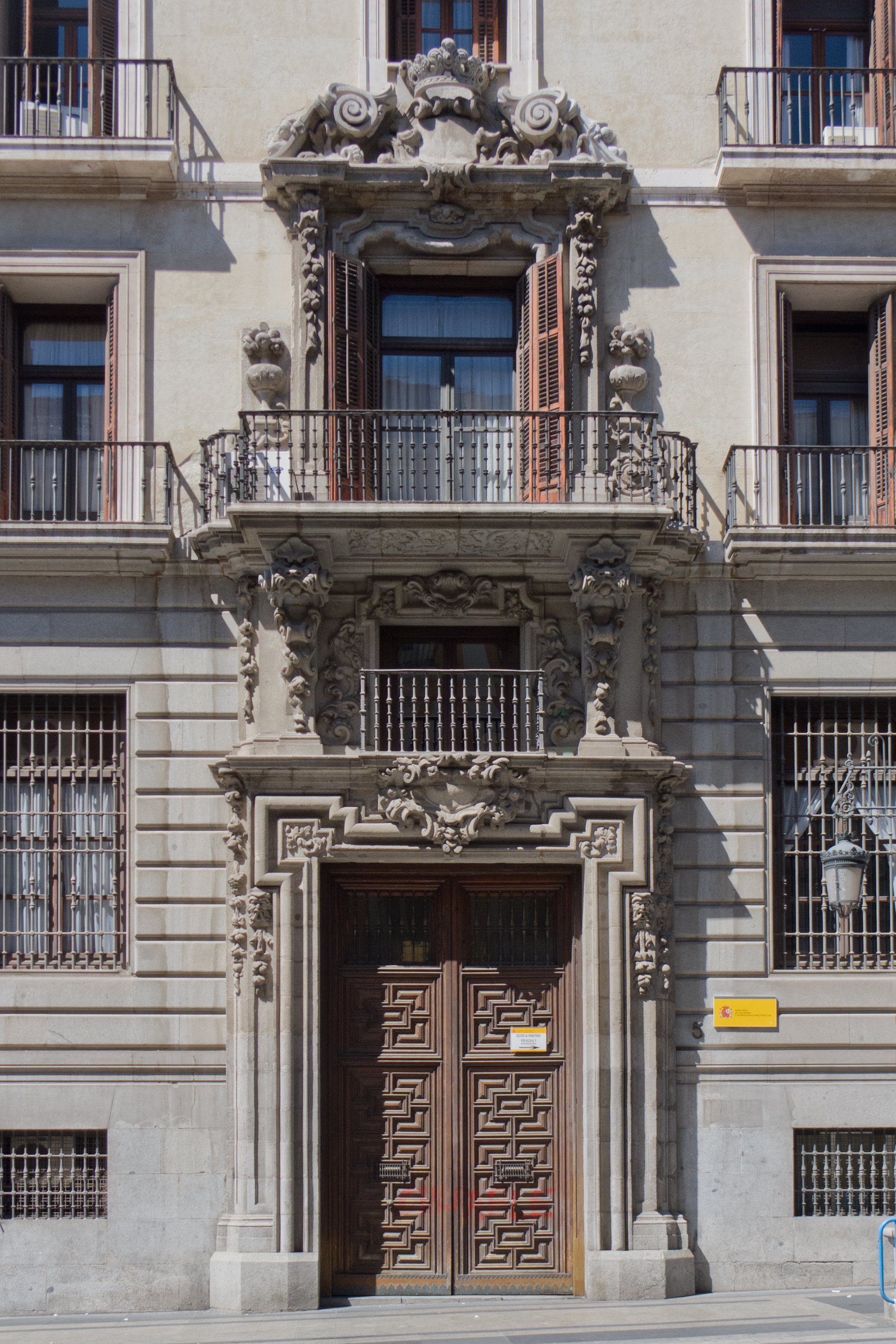
The door of the old Torrecilla Palace, a work by Pedro de Ribera.

The Ministry of Finance is one of the oldest and largest departments and, due to its size, its offices are not concentrated in a single headquarters but are spread across numerous buildings, all located in the city of Madrid. To these headquarters should be added those of the Regional Offices of Economy and Finance (Spanish: Delegaciones de Economía y Hacienda, lit. 'Delegations of Economy and Finance') and those of some public agencies of the Public Treasury that are spread throughout the national territory.

The Real Casa de la Aduana (Royal Customs House), located on Alcalá street in Madrid, has been the headquarters of the Department of Finance since 1846. First, it is worth highlighting the work carried out in 1944 by the architect Miguel Durán Salgado, who was commissioned to expand the headquarters. He did so, demolishing and erecting a new building on the site of the former Palace of the Marquess of Torrecilla, which was then incorporated into the existing structure. The Real Casa de la Aduana now features a Baroque doorway, the original one from the now-vanished Torrecilla palace, attributed to Pedro de Ribera. Furthermore, between 1963 and 1965, other renovations were undertaken, such as the roofing of one of the side courtyards, which now houses the library, and the construction of a fifth floor.

In addition to this main headquarters, which houses the minister's office, the Secretariat of State for Finance, and the Undersecretariat, the Ministry's size means that numerous bodies are distributed across other locations in Madrid. Specifically, the Ministry's agencies, as well as public companies, generally have their own headquarters. Regarding other important administrative bodies, the Secretariat of State for Budget and Expenditure and the Central Economic-Administrative Court are in the Cuzco Government Complex. Others, such as the Directorate-General for the Cadastre and the General Secretariat for European Funds, also have their own headquarters.

=== Historic ===
Along with the other departments of the early Bourbon administration, the Veeduría General and the rest of the public treasury agencies were based in the cellars of the Royal Alcázar until 1734, when it burned down and they moved to the Buen Retiro Palace. They remained there until approximately 1764, when the new Royal Palace of Madrid was inaugurated and the government's administrative bodies were located there.

By the first third of the 19th century, the ministries had grown considerably, as had the family of King Charles IV. Therefore, in 1826, the departments —except for the Secretariat of State and of the Office of State— were relocated to the Palace of the Marquess of Grimaldi (also called the House of Ministries, precisely for this reason, or the Godoy Palace, since one of its tenants was Manuel Godoy, Prince of the Peace). After a fire in 1846, the departments—except for the Secretariat of the Navy— were relocated.

That same year, the Ministry of Finance found its new and definitive headquarters in the Real Casa de la Aduana, a building constructed in the 1760s and designed by Francesco Sabatini to replace the old headquarters of the Royal Customs.

== Budget ==
In millions of euros (€)
1. Territorial financing 16,009 (83.0%)
2. Tax policy 1,547 (8.02%)
3. Central and common services 1,405 (7.29%)
4. Budgetary policy and fiscal oversight 180 (0.93%)
5. Regional incentives 144 (0.75%)

For fiscal year 2026, the Ministry of Finance has a consolidated budget of €19.3 billion. Of this amount, €17.8 billion are directly managed by the ministry's central services while €1.5 billion are managed by its agencies.

The budget can be divided into five main areas:

1. Territorial financing (Program 922N), which comprises the financial relations between the central and regional and local governments, including intergovernmental transfers and fiscal coordination mechanisms.
2. Tax policy (Programs 932A, 932M, 932N & 931O), covering tax policy design and implementation, revenue collection, regulatory functions, cadastral management and tax dispute resolution.
3. Budgetary policy and fiscal oversight (931N, 931P & 931Q), which includes budget planning, internal control, public accounting and external fiscal oversight (AIReF).
4. Regional incentives (422A), which finances government policies aimed at regional economic development.
5. Central and common services (923M, 923N, 923A, 42KD, 92SC, 93KE, 462N, 467G, 492N & 337B), covering the Ministry’s administrative functions and cross-cutting State services, including institutional support functions, State asset management and logistics services for central institutions.

Programme 000X (“Internal Transfers and Disbursements”) is excluded from the analysis, as it consists of transfers between public sector entities and would otherwise lead to double counting and distort the overall budget.

In addition to its own departmental budget, the General State Budget includes several separate budget sections that are executed by the Ministry. These are:

- Centralised public procurement (€317 million), executed through the Directorate-General for Rationalisation and Centralisation of Procurement.
- Contribution to civil service insurance (€2.4 billion), managed through the Directorate-General for Budget.
- Financial relations with the European Union (€18.04 billion), implemented through the Directorate-General for European Funds.
- Contingency Reserve Fund (€3.9 billion), administered by the Directorate-General for Budget.
- Financing of regional and local governments (€47.9 billion), managed through the General Secretariat for Regional and Local Financing.

=== Audit ===
The Ministry's accounts, as well as those of its agencies, are internally audited by the Office of the Comptroller General of the State (IGAE), through a Delegated Comptroller's Office within the Department itself. Externally, the Court of Auditors is responsible for auditing expenditures.

Likewise, the Cortes Generales execise political control over the accounts through these committees:

- Joint Congress-Senate Committee on the European Union
- Congress of Deputies Committee on Finance and Civil Service
- Congress of Deputies Committee on Budget
- Senate Committee on Finance
- Senate Committee on Budget

== Bibliography ==
- Artola Gallego, Miguel (1982). La Hacienda del Antiguo Régimen [The Treasury of the Ancient Regime] (in Spanish). Madrid: Alianza Editorial. p. 23. ISBN 84-206-8042-7.
