= General State Budget of Spain for 2017 =

The General State Budget of Spain for 2017 was the set of public accounts drafted by the Government of Spain for the 2017 fiscal year. It was presented by the Government of Mariano Rajoy and approved by the Cortes Generales on 27 June 2017. The law was published in the Boletín Oficial del Estado on 28 June.

== Context ==
The 2017 budget was the first approved by the minority People’s Party government following the 2016 Spanish general election, which had resulted in months of institutional deadlock. The need for cross-party agreements marked the budget negotiations, with support from Citizens, the Basque Nationalist Party, Canarian Coalition, and Foro Asturias proving crucial.

== Approval process ==
The Council of Ministers approved the draft budget on 31 March 2017. The Minister of Finance, Cristóbal Montoro, presented it to the Congress of Deputies on 4 April. Parliamentary debate was complex, but the draft ultimately received 176 votes in favor and 171 against. The Senate ratified the law on 27 June, and it was published in the official gazette the following day.

== Expected revenues ==
Projected non-financial revenues amounted to €200.963 billion, of which:

- €193.520 billion from tax revenue.
- €77.058 billion from personal income tax (IRPF).
- €64.020 billion from VAT.
- €23.143 billion from corporate tax.
- €18.863 billion from social contributions.
- €2.643 billion from other sources (fees, dividends, etc.).

== Expected expenditures ==
Total non-financial expenditures amounted to €279.245 billion, with the following key allocations:

- €139.647 billion for social spending.
- €133.118 billion for pensions and other social benefits.
- €7.638 billion for the Ministry of Defence.
- €5.392 billion for public investment.
- €32.171 billion for interest payments on the public debt.

== Deficit and forecasts ==
The public deficit target was set at 3.1% of GDP, in line with commitments made to the European Commission. The forecast for economic growth in 2017 was 2.5%, in a context of recovery following the financial crisis.

== Reactions ==
- The PSOE voted against the budget, arguing that it was a continuation of previous policies and did not address social needs. Its spokesman, Antonio Hernando, declared: "Even though we don’t yet know the details, it’s clear we won’t be able to support it because it will be a continuation and anti-social."
- Citizens supported the budget after negotiating measures such as a wage supplement and tax reductions for the self-employed.
- The PNV justified its support as an opportunity to improve Basque Country funding and unlock investments.

== See also ==
- General State Budget
- Government of Mariano Rajoy
- 11th Legislature of Spain
