= Rajoy government =

The term Rajoy government may refer to:

- First government of Mariano Rajoy, the government of Spain under Mariano Rajoy from 2011 to 2016.
- Second government of Mariano Rajoy, the government of Spain under Mariano Rajoy from 2016 to 2018.
