= Government of Mariano Rajoy =

Government of Mariano Rajoy may refer to:

- First government of Mariano Rajoy (2011–2016)
- Second government of Mariano Rajoy (2016–2018)
