= First government of Mariano Rajoy =

2011–2016 government of Spain

1st government of Mariano Rajoy
- Government of Spain
- 2011–2016
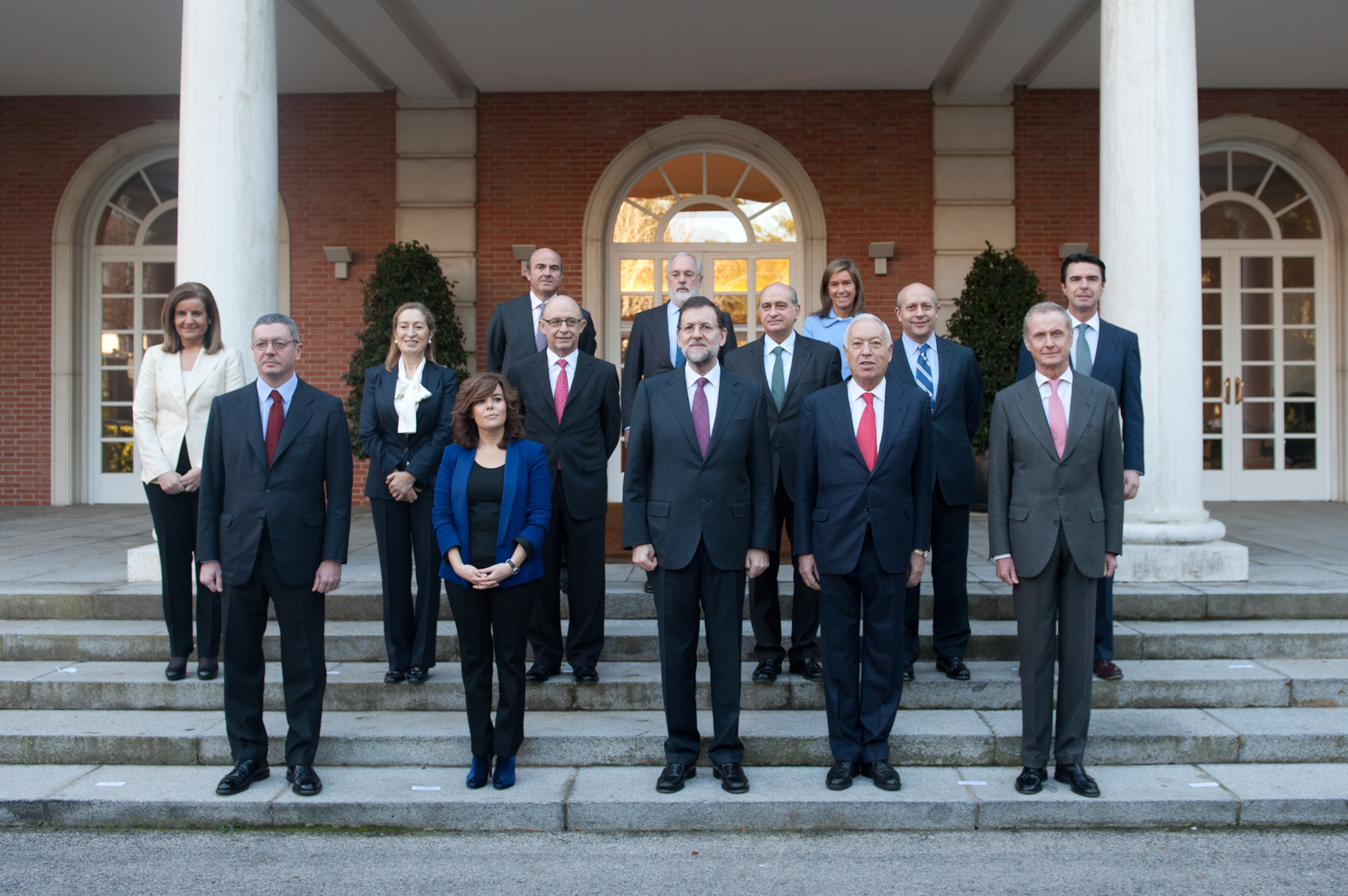
- The government in December 2011
- Date formed: 22 December 2011
- Date dissolved: 4 November 2016

People and organisations
- Monarch: Juan Carlos I (2011–2014); Felipe VI (2014–2016)
- Prime Minister: Mariano Rajoy
- Deputy Prime Minister: Soraya Sáenz de Santamaría
- No. of ministers: 13 (Note: Does not include the prime minister.)
- Total no. of members: 17
- Member party: PP
- Status in legislature: Majority (single-party) (2011–2016); Caretaker (2016)
- Opposition party: PSOE
- Opposition leader: Alfredo Pérez Rubalcaba (2011–2014); Pedro Sánchez (2014–2016)

History
- Outgoing formation: 2015–2016 government formation
- Election: 2011 general election
- Outgoing election: 2015 general election 2016 general election
- Legislature terms: 10th Cortes Generales; 11th Cortes Generales
- Budget: 2012, 2013, 2014, 2015, 2016
- Predecessor: Zapatero II
- Successor: Rajoy II

The first government of Mariano Rajoy was formed on 22 December 2011, following the latter's election as prime minister of Spain by the Congress of Deputies on 20 December and his swearing-in on 21 December, as a result of the People's Party (PP) emerging as the largest parliamentary force at the 2011 Spanish general election. It succeeded the second Zapatero government and was the government of Spain from 22 December 2011 to 4 November 2016, a total of 1,779 days, or 4 years, 10 months and 13 days.

The cabinet comprised members of the PP and a number of independents. It was automatically dismissed on 21 December 2015 as a consequence of the 2015 general election, but remained in acting capacity until the next government was sworn in.

== Investiture ==
Investiture; Congress of Deputies; Nomination of Mariano Rajoy (PP)
Ballot →	20 December 2011
Required majority →	176 out of 350
Yes: • PP (185); • FAC (1); • UPN (1)	187 / 350
No: • PSOE (110); • CiU (16); • IU–ICV–CHA (11); • UPyD (5); • ERC (3); • BNG (2); • Compromís (1); • GBai (1)	149 / 350
Abstentions: • Amaiur (7); • PNV (5); • CC (1); • NC (1)	14 / 350
Absentees	0 / 350

== Cabinet changes ==
Rajoy's first government saw a number of cabinet changes during its tenure:

- On 28 April 2014, Miguel Arias Cañete stepped down as Minister of Agriculture, Food and Environmental Affairs in order to run as the People's Party (PP)'s leading candidate in the 2014 European Parliament election. He was succeeded by Isabel García Tejerina.
- On 23 September 2014, Alberto Ruiz-Gallardón resigned as Minister of Justice, after the government chose to withdraw his proposed abortion bill. The decision was said to come over the loss of personal prestige resulting from a staunch defense of the bill, with Rajoy's u-turn on the issue being seen as a personal disavowal of Gallardón. Soraya Sáenz de Santamaría was tasked with the ordinary discharge of duties of the Ministry for Justice until Gallardon's successor, Rafael Catalá, could take office on 29 September 2014.
- On 26 November 2014, Ana Mato resigned as Minister of Health, Social Services and Equality due to her involvement in the Gürtel affair, after she was summoned to court as a "participant on a lucrative basis" in the corruption crimes allegedly committed by former husband Jesús Sepúlveda. Her resignation came one day before a plenary in Congress on corruption in which Prime Minister Rajoy was scheduled to intervene, and after Mato herself had announced earlier that day that she had not considered her resignation. Sáenz de Santamaría took on the ordinary discharge of duties of the ministry until Mato's successor, Alfonso Alonso, could take office on 3 December 2014.
- On 26 June 2015, Íñigo Méndez de Vigo replaced José Ignacio Wert as Minister of Education, Culture and Sports, after the latter had expressed his wish to retire from politics.

From 21 December 2015, Rajoy's cabinet took on acting duties for the duration of the government formation process resulting from the 2015 general election. This lasted for 315 days and saw a new general election being held in the meantime. A number of ministers renounced their posts throughout this period, with the ordinary discharge of duties of their ministries being transferred to other cabinet members as a result of Rajoy being unable to appoint replacements while in acting role.

- On 15 April 2016, José Manuel Soria was forced to renounce his post as acting Minister of Industry, Energy and Tourism over his involvement in the Panama Papers scandal, owing to the leaking of information revealing that he and his family had maintained several offshore societies on tax havens during the previous decades, as well as his confusing and changing explanations on the issue. Luis de Guindos, acting Minister of Economy and Competitiveness, took on the ordinary discharge of duties of Soria's vacant ministry.
- On 19 July 2016, Ana Pastor was elected President of the Congress of Deputies of the XII Legislature, a position incompatible with her post as acting Minister of Development. Rafael Catalá, acting Minister of Justice, took on the ordinary discharge of duties of Pastor's vacant ministry.
- On 16 August 2016, Alfonso Alonso renounced his position as acting Minister of Health, Social Services and Equality in order to run as the PP candidate for Lehendakari in the 2016 Basque regional election. Fátima Báñez, acting Minister of Employment and Social Security, took on the ordinary discharge of duties of Alonso's vacant ministry.

== Council of Ministers ==
The Council of Ministers was structured into the offices for the prime minister, the deputy prime minister, 13 ministries and the post of the spokesperson of the Government.

← Rajoy I Government → (21 December 2011 – 4 November 2016)
Portfolio	Name	Party	Took office	Left office	Ref.
Prime Minister	Mariano Rajoy	PP	21 December 2011	31 October 2016	
Deputy Prime Minister; Minister of the Presidency; Spokesperson of the Government	Soraya Sáenz de Santamaría	PP	22 December 2011	4 November 2016	
Minister of Foreign Affairs and Cooperation	José Manuel García-Margallo	PP	22 December 2011	4 November 2016	
Minister of Justice	Alberto Ruiz-Gallardón	PP	22 December 2011	23 September 2014	
Minister of Defence	Pedro Morenés	Independent	22 December 2011	4 November 2016	
Minister of Finance and Public Administrations	Cristóbal Montoro	PP	22 December 2011	4 November 2016	
Minister of the Interior	Jorge Fernández Díaz	PP	22 December 2011	4 November 2016	
Minister of Development	Ana Pastor	PP	22 December 2011	18 July 2016	
Minister of Education, Culture and Sports	José Ignacio Wert	Independent	22 December 2011	26 June 2015	
Minister of Employment and Social Security	Fátima Báñez	PP	22 December 2011	4 November 2016	
Minister of Industry, Energy and Tourism	José Manuel Soria	PP	22 December 2011	15 April 2016	
Minister of Agriculture, Food and Environment	Miguel Arias Cañete	PP	22 December 2011	28 April 2014	
Minister of Economy and Competitiveness	Luis de Guindos	Independent	22 December 2011	4 November 2016	
Minister of Health, Social Services and Equality	Ana Mato	PP	22 December 2011	26 November 2014	
=== Changes April 2014 ===
Portfolio	Name	Party	Took office	Left office	Ref.
Minister of Agriculture, Food and Environment	Isabel García Tejerina	PP	28 April 2014	4 November 2016	
=== Changes September 2014 ===
Portfolio	Name	Party	Took office	Left office	Ref.
Minister of Justice	Soraya Sáenz de Santamaría took on the ordinary discharge of duties from 23 to 29 September 2014.				
Minister of Justice	Rafael Catalá	PP	29 September 2014	4 November 2016	
=== Changes November 2014 ===
Portfolio	Name	Party	Took office	Left office	Ref.
Minister of Health, Social Services and Equality	Soraya Sáenz de Santamaría took on the ordinary discharge of duties from 26 November to 3 December 2014.				
Minister of Health, Social Services and Equality	Alfonso Alonso	PP	3 December 2014	10 August 2016	
=== Changes June 2015 ===
Portfolio	Name	Party	Took office	Left office	Ref.
Minister of Education, Culture and Sports	Íñigo Méndez de Vigo	PP	26 June 2015	4 November 2016	
=== Changes 2016 ===
Portfolio	Name	Party	Took office	Left office	Ref.
Minister of Industry, Energy and Tourism	Luis de Guindos took on the ordinary discharge of duties from 15 April to 4 November 2016.				
Minister of Development	Rafael Catalá took on the ordinary discharge of duties from 18 July to 4 November 2016.				
Minister of Health, Social Services and Equality	Fátima Báñez took on the ordinary discharge of duties from 10 August to 4 November 2016.				

== Departmental structure ==
Mariano Rajoy's first government was organised into several superior and governing units, whose number, powers and hierarchical structure varied depending on the ministerial department.

Unit/body rank

- (■) Secretary of state
- (■) Undersecretary
- (■) Director-general
- (●) Autonomous agency
- (◆) Military & intelligence agency

Office (Original name)	Portrait	Name	Took office	Left office	Alliance/party	Ref.
=== Prime Minister's Office ===
Prime Minister (Presidencia del Gobierno)		Mariano Rajoy	21 December 2011	31 October 2016	PP	
Prime Minister (Presidencia del Gobierno)	24 December 2011 – 3 August 2013: (■) Cabinet of the Prime Minister's Office–Chief of Staff; (■) Deputy Chief of Staff; (■) General Secretariat of the Prime Minister's Office; (■) Coordinator Office for the Prime Minister's Affairs (est. 31 Dec 2011); (■) Department of Protocol; (■) Department of Security; (■) Department of Institutional Affairs (disest. 15 Jan 2012); (■) Department of Legal-Institutional Affairs (est. 15 Jan 2012); (■) Department of International Policy and Security; (■) Department of Analysis and Studies (D/G 15 Jan 2012); (■) Economic Office of the Prime Minister; (■) Department of Social and Industrial Policy (disest. 15 Jan 2012); (■) Department of International Economy (est. 15 Jan 2012); (■) Technical Secretariat of the Delegated Commission for Economic Affairs (est. 15 Jan 2012); 3 August 2013 – 4 November 2016: (■) Cabinet of the Prime Minister's Office–Chief of Staff; (■) Deputy Chief of Staff–Department of National Security; (■) Department of International Affairs; (■) Department of National Affairs; (■) General Secretariat of the Prime Minister's Office; (■) Coordinator Office for the Prime Minister's Affairs; (■) Department of Protocol; (■) Department of Security; (■) Economic Office of the Prime Minister; (■) Department of International Economy (disest. 21 Sep 2013); (■) Technical Secretariat of the Delegated Commission for Economic Affairs (disest. 21 Sep 2013); (■) Directorate-General of the Technical Secretariat of the Delegated Commission for Economic Affairs and for International Economic Affairs (est. 21 Sep 2013); (■) Directorate-General for Financial, Macroeconomic and Labour Policies (est. 21 Sep 2013)					
Deputy Prime Minister (Vicepresidencia del Gobierno)		Soraya Sáenz de Santamaría	22 December 2011	4 November 2016	PP	
Deputy Prime Minister (Vicepresidencia del Gobierno)	See Ministry of the Presidency					
=== Ministry of Foreign Affairs and Cooperation ===
Ministry of Foreign Affairs and Cooperation (Ministerio de Asuntos Exteriores y de Cooperación)		José Manuel García-Margallo	22 December 2011	4 November 2016	PP	
Ministry of Foreign Affairs and Cooperation (Ministerio de Asuntos Exteriores y de Cooperación)	31 December 2011 – 6 January 2012: (■) State Secretariat for Foreign Affairs and Cooperation; (■) General Secretariat for International Cooperation for Development; (■) Directorate-General for Foreign Policy and Multilateral, Global and Security Affairs; (■) Directorate-General for the Maghreb, Africa, the Mediterranean and the Middle East; (■) Directorate-General for North America, Asia and the Pacific; (■) Directorate-General for Spaniards Abroad and Consular and Migratory Affairs; (■) State Secretariat for the European Union; (■) Directorate-General for Coordination of Common Policies and General Affairs of the European Union; (■) Directorate-General for Bilateral Relations with European Union Countries, Candidate Countries and Countries of the European Economic Area; (■) State Secretariat for Ibero-America; (■) Directorate-General for Ibero-America; (■) Undersecretariat of Foreign Affairs and Cooperation; (■) Technical General Secretariat; (■) Directorate-General for the Foreign Service; (■) Directorate-General for International Economic Relations; (■) Directorate-General for Media and Public Diplomacy; (■) Office for Diplomatic Information; (■) Introducer of Ambassadors; 6 January 2012 – 12 November 2016: (■) State Secretariat for Foreign Affairs; (■) Directorate-General for Foreign Policy and Multilateral, Global and Security Affairs (disest. 10 Jan 2015); (■) Directorate-General for Foreign Policy and Security (est. 10 Jan 2015); (■) Directorate-General for the United Nations and Human Rights (est. 10 Jan 2015); (■) Directorate-General for the Maghreb, Africa, the Mediterranean and the Middle East; (■) Directorate-General for North America, Asia and the Pacific; (■) State Secretariat for the European Union; (■) Directorate-General for Coordination of Common Policies and General Affairs of the European Union; (■) Directorate-General for Bilateral Relations with European Union Countries, Candidate Countries and Countries of the European Economic Area; (■) State Secretariat for International Cooperation and for Ibero-America; (■) General Secretariat for International Cooperation for Development; (■) Directorate-General for Ibero-America; (■) Undersecretariat of Foreign Affairs and Cooperation; (■) Technical General Secretariat; (■) Directorate-General for the Foreign Service; (■) Directorate-General for Spaniards Abroad and Consular and Migratory Affairs; (■) Directorate-General for International Economic Relations; (■) Directorate-General for Media and Public Diplomacy; (■) Office for Diplomatic Information; (■) Introducer of Ambassadors					
=== Ministry of Justice ===
Ministry of Justice (Ministerio de Justicia)		Alberto Ruiz-Gallardón	22 December 2011	23 September 2014 (resigned)	PP	
Ministry of Justice (Ministerio de Justicia)		Soraya Sáenz de Santamaría (ordinary discharge of duties)	23 September 2014	29 September 2014	PP	
Ministry of Justice (Ministerio de Justicia)		Rafael Catalá	29 September 2014	4 November 2016	PP	
Ministry of Justice (Ministerio de Justicia)	31 December 2011 – 12 November 2016: (■) State Secretariat for Justice; (■) General Secretariat for Modernization and Relations with the Administration of Justice (until 7 Mar 2012) / General Secretariat for the Administration of Justice (from 7 Mar 2012); (■) Directorate-General for Relations with the Administration of Justice; (■) Directorate-General for International Legal Cooperation and Relations with Religions (until 7 Mar 2012); (■) Office for Asset Recovery and Management (est. 24 Oct 2015); (■) Directorate-General for International Legal Cooperation and Relations with Religions (from 7 Mar 2012); (■) Undersecretariat of Justice; (■) Technical General Secretariat; (■) Directorate-General for Registries and Notaries; (■) Office of the Solicitor General of the State–Directorate of the State Legal Service					
=== Ministry of Defence ===
Ministry of Defence (Ministerio de Defensa)		Pedro Morenés	22 December 2011	4 November 2016	PP (Independent)	
Ministry of Defence (Ministerio de Defensa)	31 December 2011 – 12 November 2016: (■) State Secretariat for Defence; (■) Directorate-General for Armament and Materiel; (■) Directorate-General for Economic Affairs; (■) Directorate-General for Infrastructure; (■) Undersecretariat of Defence; (■) Technical General Secretariat; (■) Directorate-General for Personnel; (■) Directorate-General for Military Recruitment and Teaching; (■) General Secretariat for Defence Policy; (■) Directorate-General for Defence Policy; (◆) Armed Forces; (■) Defence Staff–Chief of the Defence Staff; (■) Army–Chief of Staff of the Army; (■) Navy–Chief of Staff of the Navy; (■) Air Force–Chief of Staff of the Air Force					
=== Ministry of Finance and Public Administrations ===
Ministry of Finance and Public Administrations (Ministerio de Hacienda y Administraciones Públicas)		Cristóbal Montoro	22 December 2011	4 November 2016	PP	
Ministry of Finance and Public Administrations (Ministerio de Hacienda y Administraciones Públicas)	31 December 2011 – 12 November 2016: (■) State Secretariat for Finance; (■) Directorate-General for Taxes; (■) Directorate-General for the Cadastre; (■) Central Economic-Administrative Court; (■) Directorate-General for the Regulation of Gambling; (■) State Secretariat for Budgets and Expenditure; (■) Office of the Comptroller General of the State Administration; (■) Directorate-General for Budgets; (■) Directorate-General for Personnel Costs and Public Pensions; (■) Directorate-General for Community Funds; (■) State Secretariat for Public Administrations; (■) General Secretariat for Regional and Local Coordination; (■) Directorate-General for Coordination of Competencies with the Autonomous Communities and the Local Entities; (■) Directorate for Information and Communications Technologies (est. 27 Sep 2014); (■) Directorate-General for the Civil Service; (■) Directorate-General for Administrative Modernization, Procedures and Promotion of Electronic Administration (disest. 27 Sep 2014); (■) Directorate-General for Administrative Organization and Procedures (est. 27 Sep 2014); (■) Directorate-General for Coordination of the Peripheral State Administration; (■) Undersecretariat of Finance and Public Administrations; (■) Technical General Secretariat; (■) Directorate-General for the State Heritage; (■) Inspectorate-General; (■) Directorate-General for Rationalization and Centralization of Contracting (est. 21 Sep 2013)					
=== Ministry of the Interior ===
Ministry of the Interior (Ministerio del Interior)		Jorge Fernández Díaz	22 December 2011	4 November 2016	PP	
Ministry of the Interior (Ministerio del Interior)	31 December 2011 – 12 November 2016: (■) State Secretariat for Security; (■) Directorate-General of the Police; (■) Directorate-General of the Civil Guard; (■) General Secretariat for Penitentiary Institutions; (■) Directorate-General for International Relations and Foreigners; (■) Undersecretariat of the Interior; (■) Technical General Secretariat; (■) Directorate-General for Internal Policy; (■) Directorate-General for Traffic; (■) Directorate-General for Civil Protection and Emergencies; (■) Directorate-General for Support to Victims of Terrorism					
=== Ministry of Development ===
Ministry of Development (Ministerio de Fomento)		Ana Pastor	22 December 2011	18 July 2016 (renounced)	PP	
Ministry of Development (Ministerio de Fomento)		Rafael Catalá (ordinary discharge of duties)	18 July 2016	4 November 2016	PP	
Ministry of Development (Ministerio de Fomento)	31 December 2011 – 12 November 2016: (■) State Secretariat for Planning and Infrastructure (until 6 Mar 2012) / State Secretariat for Infrastructure, Transport and Housing (from 6 Mar 2012); (■) General Secretariat for Infrastructure; (■) Directorate-General for Roads; (■) Directorate-General for Railways (disest. 1 Apr 2015); (■) General Secretariat for Transport; (■) Directorate-General for Civil Aviation; (■) Directorate-General for the Merchant Marine; (■) Directorate-General for Land Transport; (■) Directorate-General for Architecture, Housing and Soil; (■) Undersecretariat of Development; (■) Technical General Secretariat; (■) Directorate-General for Economic Programming and Budgets; (■) Inspectorate-General of Development; (■) Directorate-General of the National Geographic Institute					
=== Ministry of Education, Culture and Sports ===
Ministry of Education, Culture and Sports (Ministerio de Educación, Cultura y Deporte)		José Ignacio Wert	22 December 2011	26 June 2015	PP (Independent)	
Ministry of Education, Culture and Sports (Ministerio de Educación, Cultura y Deporte)		Íñigo Méndez de Vigo	26 June 2015	4 November 2016	PP	
Ministry of Education, Culture and Sports (Ministerio de Educación, Cultura y Deporte)	31 December 2011 – 12 November 2016: (■) State Secretariat for Education, Vocational Training and Universities; (■) General Secretariat for Universities; (■) Directorate-General for University Policy; (■) Directorate-General for Evaluation and Territorial Cooperation; (■) Directorate-General for Vocational Training; (■) State Secretariat for Culture; (■) Directorate-General for Cultural Policy and Industries and Books; (■) Directorate-General for Fine Arts and Cultural Property and Archives and Libraries; (■) Undersecretariat of Education, Culture and Sports; (■) Technical General Secretariat; (●) High Council for Sports; (■) President's Office of the High Council for Sports; (■) Directorate-General for Sports; (■) Directorate-General for Sports Infrastructure (disest. 28 Jan 2012)					
=== Ministry of Employment and Social Security ===
Ministry of Employment and Social Security (Ministerio de Empleo y Seguridad Social)		Fátima Báñez	22 December 2011	4 November 2016	PP	
Ministry of Employment and Social Security (Ministerio de Empleo y Seguridad Social)	31 December 2011 – 12 November 2016: (■) State Secretariat for Employment; (■) Directorate-General for Employment; (■) Directorate-General for Self-Employment, the Social Economy and Corporate Social Responsibility; (■) State Secretariat for Social Security; (■) Directorate-General for Social Security Management; (■) Office of the Comptroller General of the Social Security; (■) General Secretariat for Immigration and Emigration; (■) Directorate-General for Migration; (■) Undersecretariat of Employment and Social Security; (■) Technical General Secretariat; (■) Directorate-General for Labour and Social Security Inspection					
=== Ministry of Industry, Energy and Tourism ===
Ministry of Industry, Energy and Tourism (Ministerio de Industria, Energía y Turismo)		José Manuel Soria	22 December 2011	15 April 2016 (renounced)	PP	
Ministry of Industry, Energy and Tourism (Ministerio de Industria, Energía y Turismo)		Luis de Guindos (ordinary discharge of duties)	15 April 2016	4 November 2016	PP (Independent)	
Ministry of Industry, Energy and Tourism (Ministerio de Industria, Energía y Turismo)	31 December 2011 – 12 November 2016: (■) State Secretariat for Energy; (■) Directorate-General for Energy Policy and Mines; (■) State Secretariat for Telecommunications and the Information Society; (■) Directorate-General for Telecommunications and Information Technologies; (■) State Secretariat for Tourism; (■) Undersecretariat of Industry, Energy and Tourism; (■) Technical General Secretariat; (■) General Secretariat for Industry and Small and Medium-sized Enterprises; (■) Directorate-General for Industry and Small and Medium-sized Enterprises					
=== Ministry of Agriculture, Food and Environment ===
Ministry of Agriculture, Food and Environment (Ministerio de Agricultura, Alimentación y Medio Ambiente)		Miguel Arias Cañete	22 December 2011	28 April 2014	PP	
Ministry of Agriculture, Food and Environment (Ministerio de Agricultura, Alimentación y Medio Ambiente)		Isabel García Tejerina	28 April 2014	4 November 2016	PP	
Ministry of Agriculture, Food and Environment (Ministerio de Agricultura, Alimentación y Medio Ambiente)	31 December 2011 – 12 November 2016: (■) State Secretariat for Environment; (■) Spanish Office for Climate Change; (■) Directorate-General for Environmental Quality and Evaluation and Natural Environment; (■) Directorate-General for Sustainability of the Coast and the Sea; (■) Directorate-General for Water; (■) General Secretariat for Agriculture and Food; (■) Directorate-General for Agricultural Production and Markets; (■) Directorate-General for Health of Agricultural Production; (■) Directorate-General for Rural Development and Forest Policy; (■) Directorate-General for the Food Industry; (■) Undersecretariat of Agriculture, Food and Environment; (■) Technical General Secretariat; (■) Directorate-General for Services; (■) General Secretariat for Fisheries; (■) Directorate-General for Fishery Resources and Aquaculture; (■) Directorate-General for Fisheries Management					
=== Ministry of the Presidency ===
Ministry of the Presidency (Ministerio de la Presidencia)		Soraya Sáenz de Santamaría	22 December 2011	4 November 2016	PP	
Ministry of the Presidency (Ministerio de la Presidencia)	31 December 2011 – 12 November 2016: (■) State Secretariat for Relations with the Cortes; (■) Directorate-General for Relations with the Cortes; (■) State Secretariat for Press; (■) Directorate-General for Communication; (■) Undersecretariat of the Presidency; (■) Technical General Secretariat (disest. 24 Jan 2012); (■) Technical General Secretariat–Government Secretariat (est. 24 Jan 2012); (■) Directorate-General for Relations with the Government Delegations in the Autonomous Communities; (■) Directorate for Information and Communication Technologies of the General State Administration (est. 24 Sep 2013; disest. 27 Sep 2014); (■) Office for the Implementation of the Administration Reform (est. 3 Aug 2014); (◆) National Intelligence Centre; (■) State Secretariat–Directorate of the National Intelligence Centre; (■) General Secretariat of the National Intelligence Centre; (■) Technical Directorate for Resources; (■) Technical Directorate for Intelligence; (■) Technical Directorate for Intelligence Support					
=== Ministry of Economy and Competitiveness ===
Ministry of Economy and Competitiveness (Ministerio de Economía y Competitividad)		Luis de Guindos	22 December 2011	4 November 2016	PP (Independent)	
Ministry of Economy and Competitiveness (Ministerio de Economía y Competitividad)	31 December 2011 – 12 November 2016: (■) State Secretariat for Economy and Enterprise Support; (■) General Secretariat for the Treasury and Financial Policy; (■) Directorate-General for the Treasury (est. 2 Aug 2014); (■) Directorate-General for Economic Policy; (■) Directorate-General for Macroeconomic Analysis and International Economy; (■) Directorate-General for Insurance and Pension Funds; (■) State Secretariat for Trade; (■) Directorate-General for Trade and Investments (disest. 5 Apr 2014); (■) Directorate-General for International Trade and Investments (est. 5 Apr 2014); (■) Directorate-General for Internal Trade; (■) State Secretariat for Research, Development and Innovation; (■) General Secretariat for Innovation (until 11 Feb 2012) / General Secretariat for Science, Technology and Innovation (11 Feb 2012 – 29 Nov 2015) / General Secretariat for Science and Innovation (from 29 Nov 2015); (■) Directorate-General for Technology Transfer and Enterprise Development (disest. 11 Feb 2012); (■) Directorate-General for Scientific and Technical Research (est. 11 Feb 2012; disest. 29 Nov 2015); (■) Directorate-General for Innovation and Competitiveness (est. 11 Feb 2012; disest. 29 Nov 2015); (■) Directorate-General for Research and Management of the National Plan for RDI (disest. 11 Feb 2012); (■) Directorate-General for Research, Development and Innovation Policy (est. 29 Nov 2015); (■) Undersecretariat of Economy and Competitiveness; (■) Technical General Secretariat					
=== Ministry of Health, Social Services and Equality ===
Ministry of Health, Social Services and Equality (Ministerio de Sanidad, Servicios Sociales e Igualdad)		Ana Mato	22 December 2011	26 November 2014 (resigned)	PP	
Ministry of Health, Social Services and Equality (Ministerio de Sanidad, Servicios Sociales e Igualdad)		Soraya Sáenz de Santamaría (ordinary discharge of duties)	26 November 2014	3 December 2014	PP	
Ministry of Health, Social Services and Equality (Ministerio de Sanidad, Servicios Sociales e Igualdad)		Alfonso Alonso	3 December 2014	10 August 2016 (renounced)	PP	
Ministry of Health, Social Services and Equality (Ministerio de Sanidad, Servicios Sociales e Igualdad)		Fátima Báñez (ordinary discharge of duties)	10 August 2016	4 November 2016	PP	
Ministry of Health, Social Services and Equality (Ministerio de Sanidad, Servicios Sociales e Igualdad)	31 December 2011 – 12 November 2016: (■) State Secretariat for Social Services and Equality; (■) Government Delegation for Gender Violence; (■) Directorate-General for Equal Opportunities (disest. 18 Sep 2014); (■) Directorate-General of Services for Families and Children; (■) Directorate-General for Disability Support Policies; (■) Government Delegation for the National Plan on Drugs; (■) Undersecretariat of Health, Social Services and Equality; (■) Technical General Secretariat; (■) General Secretariat for Health (until 24 Jan 2012) / General Secretariat for Health and Consumer Affairs (from 24 Jan 2012); (■) Directorate-General for Public Health, Quality and Innovation; (■) Directorate-General for the Basic Catalogue of Services of the National Health System and Pharmacy; (■) Directorate-General for Professional Management					
=== Spokesperson of the Government ===
Spokesperson of the Government (Portavoz del Gobierno)		Soraya Sáenz de Santamaría	22 December 2011	4 November 2016	PP	

== Notes ==
Preceded by Zapatero II	Government of Spain; 2011–2016	Succeeded by Rajoy II
