= Government of the 12th Legislature of Spain =

Government of the 12th Legislature of Spain may refer to:

- Rajoy II Government, the government of Spain during the 12th Legislature from 4 November 2016 to 7 June 2018.
- Sánchez I Government, the government of Spain during the 12th Legislature from 7 June 2018 to 21 May 2019.
