= 2016 Spanish General State Budget =

48/2015
- Party: PP
- Finance minister: Cristóbal Montoro
- Total revenue: €329.93 billion
- Total expenditures: €436.37 billion
- Deficit: €106.44 billion
- Website: 2016 Spanish General State Budget

The 2016 Spanish General State Budget was the state budget for the Kingdom of Spain for the year 2016.

== Structure ==
=== Income ===
(in thousands)
Source	State	Autonomous organisms	State agencies	Other public organisms	Social Security	TOTAL
Direct taxes and social contributions	69,404,000.00	23,234,321.97	0	0	117,242,577.41	209,880,899.38
Indirect taxes	43,476,000.00	0	0	0	0	43,476,000.00
Rates, public prices and other revenues	6,857,871.00	1,904,090.77	235,246.57	171,793.53	989,160.56	10,158,162.43
Current transfers	8,267,478.28	12,469,762.03	632,373.96	1,304,101.41	16,731,714.50	39,405,430.18
Short-term income	5,179,636.00	120,313.16	1,974.20	5,664.11	1,633,504.14	6,941,091.61
Total current transactions	133,184,985.28	37,728,487.93	869,594.73	1,481,559.05	136,596,956.61	309,861,583.60
Disposal of real investments	198,710.00	164,473.14	0	80.00	311.15	363,574.29
Transfers of capital	1,389,304.72	1,648,376.15	227,637.19	3,959,591.68	924,237.44	8,149,147.18
Total capital transactions	1,588,014.72	1,812,849.29	227,637.19	3,959,671.68	924,548.59	8,512,721.47
Non-financial transactions	134,773,000.00	39,541,337.22	1,097,231.92	5,441,230.73	137,521,505.20	318,374,305.07
Financial assets	2,773,731.00	563,611.42	171,389.99	27,710.90	7,863,453.09	11,399,896.40
Financial liabilities	0	151,565.09	0	0	1,000.00	152,565.09
Financial transactions	2,773,731.00	715,176.51	171,389.99	27,710.90	7,864,453.09	11,552,461.49
Total	137,546,731.00	40,256,513.73	1,268,621.91	5,468,941.63	145,385,958.29	329,926,766.56

=== Expenditure ===
(in thousands)
Source	Total	%
Justice	1,604,311.79	0.37
Defence	5,734,291.91	1.31
Social security and penitentiary institutions	7,903,690.20	1.81
Foreign policy	1,477,939.85	0.34
Pensions	135,448,925.79	31.04
Other economic benefits	11,685,711.21	2.68
Social services and social promotion	2,296,222.52	0.53
Employment promotion	5,214,915.94	1.20
Unemployment	19,620,938.90	4.50
Access to housing and building	587,409.09	0.13
Administration of the social security	5,990,770.15	1.37
Health care	4,000,117.65	0.92
Education	2,484,280.81	0.57
Culture	806,859.34	0.18
Agriculture, fisheries and food	7,403,252.30	1.70
Industry and energy	5,457,019.46	1.25
Trade, tourism and SMEs	982,618,81	0.23
Subsidies for transportation	1,424,067.76	0.33
Infrastructures	6,254,768.85	1.43
Research, development and innovation	6,429,599.27	1.47
Other economic actions	665,379.92	0.15
Higher offices	633,590.89	0.15
General services	33,998,158.19	7.79
Financial and tax administration	1,656,815.13	0.38
Transfers to other Public Administrations	48,816,042.45	11.19
Public debt	117,792,324.91	26.99
Total	436,370,023.09	100.00

== See also ==
- General State Budget
