= José Manuel Soria =

Spanish politician (born 1958)

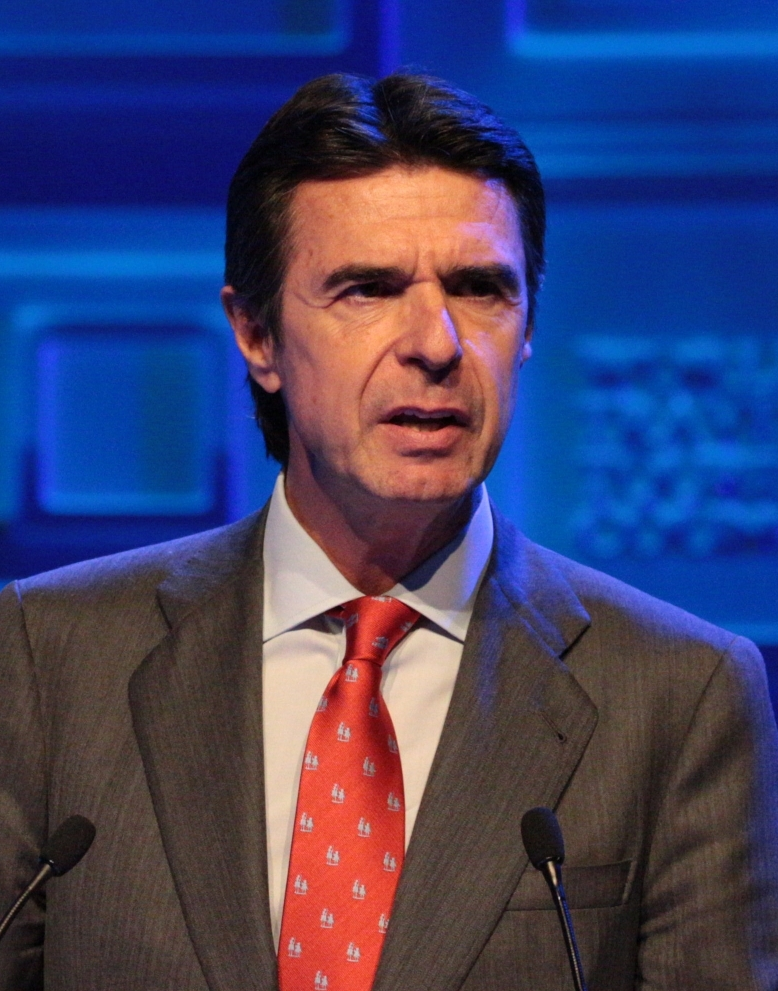
- José Manuel Soria (2015)

Minister of Industry, Energy and Tourism
- In office 22 December 2011 – 15 April 2016
- Monarchs: Juan Carlos I (2011–2014); Felipe VI (2014–2016)
- Prime Minister: Mariano Rajoy
- Preceded by: Miguel Sebastián
- Succeeded by: Luis de Guindos (acting); Álvaro Nadal

Personal details
- Born: 5 January 1958 (age 68) Las Palmas de Gran Canaria, Spain

José Manuel Soria López (born 5 January 1958) is a Spanish politician and businessman. He was involved in the regional politics of the Canary Islands before being elected to the national congress and serving as Spain's minister of industry, energy and tourism from 2011 to 2016. He was forced to resign in April 2016 after being linked with offshore companies in the Panama Papers.

== Early life and education ==
Soria was born in Las Palmas de Gran Canaria in 1958. He holds a graduate degree in economics and business studies.

== Career ==
Soria was a market analyst for Venezuela and the Caribbean at the Spanish Embassy in Venezuela from 1980 to 1981. He then served as the head of the imports service at the ministry of trade in 1984. He was lecturer of macro economics and international economics at the Centre for Trade Studies in Madrid from 1984 to 1989. He also served as the head of foreign trade at the ministry of trade in 1985, advisor to the minister of finance from 1986 to 1987 and chief of staff of the general secretariat of commerce from 1988 to 1989.

He was the mayor of Las Palmas de Gran Canaria from 1995 to 2003. He was elected president of the Popular Party of the Canary Islands in October 1999. Then he served as the president of the Cabildo de Gran Canaria from June 2003 to July 2007. He became a member of the regional parliament in June 2003 which he still holds. He also headed the party's group at the Canary Islands parliament. He served at the Canary Islands government as vice-president and treasury minister from July 2007 to October 2010. He was a member of the congress of deputies for Las Palmas in the 10th Legislature. He was appointed minister of industry, energy and tourism to the cabinet led by Prime Minister Mariano Rajoy on 22 December 2011.

In April 2016, following the publication of the Panama Papers, it was learned that Soria, along with other members of his family, operated a network of companies including ones based in the Bahamas and Jersey. After initially denying having links to tax havens, he resigned on 15 April 2016 as industry minister. He also resigned from the leadership of his party in the Canary Islands and from his post as congressional deputy.

In September 2016, the Spanish government selected him as a candidate for the executive director of the World Bank. Some Spanish politicians expressed their concerns about this candidacy. Due to the pressure of politicians and public opinion, he withdrew his application for that job.
