= Luis de Guindos =

Spanish politician (born 1960)

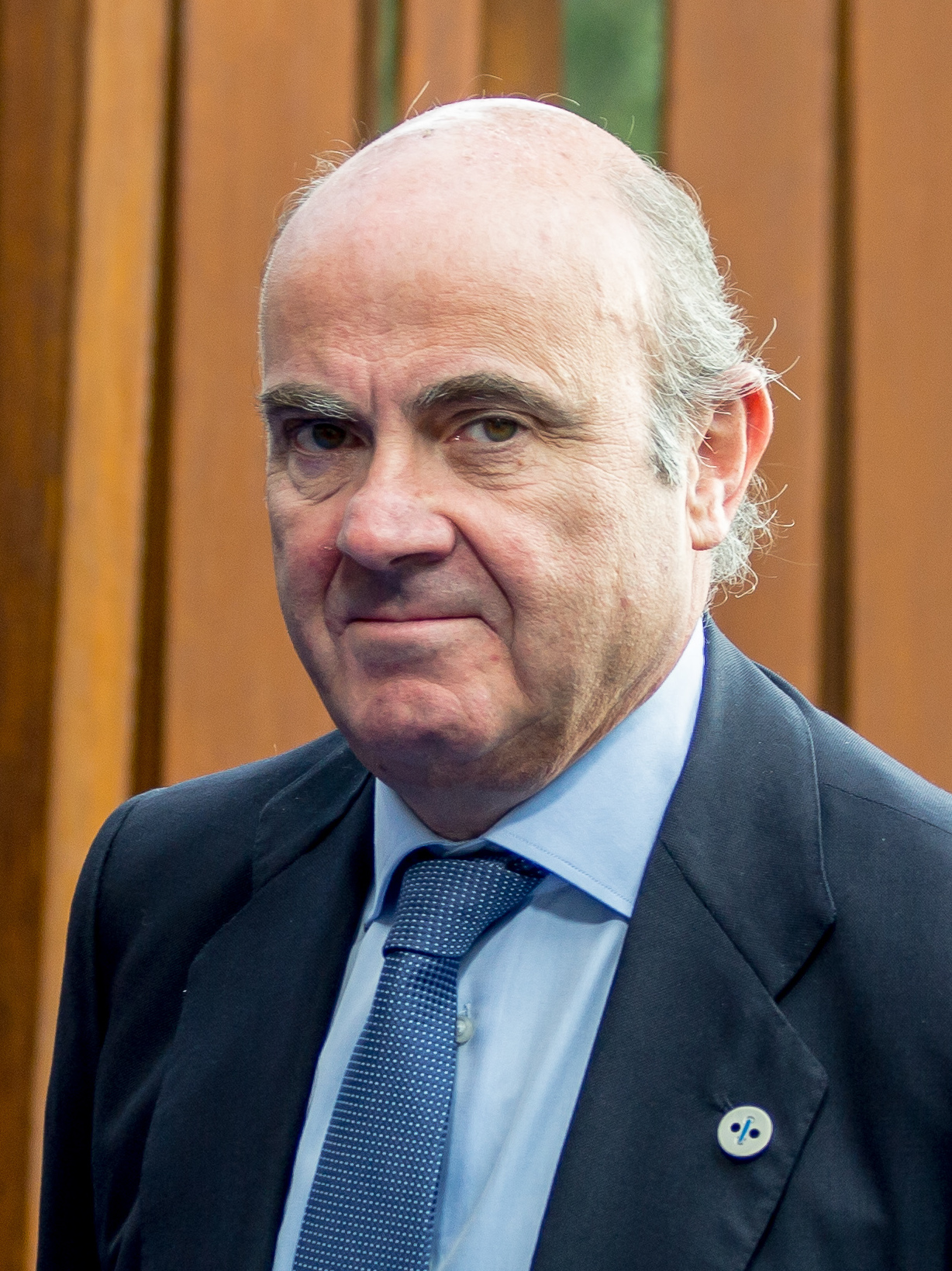
- De Guindos in 2017

Vice-President of the European Central Bank
- In office 1 June 2018 – 31 May 2026
- President: Mario Draghi; Christine Lagarde
- Preceded by: Vítor Constâncio
- Succeeded by: Boris Vujčić

Minister of Economy, Industry and Competitiveness
- In office 21 December 2011 – 7 March 2018
- Prime Minister: Mariano Rajoy
- Preceded by: Elena Salgado (Economy and Finance)
- Succeeded by: Román Escolano

Minister of Industry, Energy and Tourism
- Acting; 16 April 2016 – 4 November 2016
- Prime Minister: Mariano Rajoy
- Preceded by: Jose Manuel Soria
- Succeeded by: Álvaro Nadal

Personal details
- Born: 16 January 1960 (age 66) Madrid, Spain
- Party: Independent
- Education: CUNEF University

Luis de Guindos Jurado (born 16 January 1960) is a Spanish politician who served as Vice-President of the European Central Bank from 2018 to 2026. He previously served as Spain's Minister of Economy, Industry and Competitiveness from 2011 to 2018.

== Early life and education ==
De Guindos was born in Madrid, Spain, on 16 January 1960. He is a Bachelor of Economics and Business at CUNEF University.

=== Career ===
De Guindos was once the Managing Partner of Advisors AB(which became the Spanish office of Morgan Stanley after the later absorbed the firm), secretary of the magazine "Business Information Spanish", and vocal advisor to the Secretary of State for Economy of Spain and Head of Technical Office of the General Secretariat of Commerce.

In late 1996, de Guindos was appointed General Director for Economic and Competitiveness. He has served on the board of Renfe between 1997 and 2000 and the Official Credit Institute from 2000 to 2002. In May 2000 was appointed Secretary in General for Economy, and State Industrial Holdings Company. He was Secretary of State for Economic Affairs under Minister for Economic Affairs Rodrigo Rato in the last government led by José María Aznar and was succeeded by David Vegara. In this capacity, he was in charge of overseeing Spain's entry into the eurozone.

=== Private sector, 2004–2011 ===
In 2006, de Guindos was appointed advisor for Lehman Brothers in Europe and director of its subsidiary bank in Spain and Portugal, where he remained until the collapse and declaration of bankruptcy of the latter in 2008. Subsequently, de Guindos became responsible for the finance division of Pricewaterhouse Coopers. Finally, and in a largely ceremonial role, he was appointed as a professor of finance at the PwC and IE Financial Sector Center of IE Business School (Madrid), between 2010 and 2012, before joining as a minister. He was also a board member of Endesa SA, a Spanish power company.

From 2011, de Guindos worked for the board of Mare Nostrum Bank, which was formed in 2010 from a merger of savings banks, until he resigned to become part of the Rajoy government led by Mariano Rajoy in December of that year.

=== Minister of Economy and Competitiveness, 2011–2018 ===
De Guindos has served as economy minister in Rajoy's centre-right government since it took office in December 2011 and is credited with steering Spain to economic recovery following the euro zone's 2009–2014 crisis. He played a crucial role in negotiating the European Union's €100 billion bailout of Spain's stricken savings banks, and in spearheading the country's overhaul of the banking sector, labour market and other parts of the economy. His implementation of a program of both structural reforms and austerity measures has earned praise from Spain's European partners and the Organisation for Economic Co-operation and Development (OECD), which estimated that no country other than Greece had implemented more structural reforms than Spain.

In 2012, de Guindos and Rajoy initially blocked the appointment of Yves Mersch to succeed José Manuel González Paramo as member of the Executive Board of the European Central Bank, instead putting forward ECB General Counsel Antonio Sáinz de Vicuña y Barroso for the role. At the time, analysts said that if Spain had nominated de Guindo's predecessor Elena Salgado for the board, she would have been a shoo-in instead of Mersch who was ultimately elected.

In January 2014, de Guindos was elected co-chair (alongside Anders Borg, later Valdis Dombrovskis) of the EPP Economic and Financial Affairs Ministers Meeting, which gathers the center-right European People's Party (EPP) ministers ahead of meetings of the Economic and Financial Affairs Council (ECOFIN. In August 2014, German Chancellor Angela Merkel, who also belongs to the EPP political bloc, gave him her backing in his bid to succeed Jeroen Dijsselbloem as leading the Eurogroup from mid-2015; Securing the Eurogroup post for de Guindos was a key political goal for Rajoy, who hoped that his appointment will cement perceptions both at home and abroad that Spain has emerged from crisis and can be taken seriously once again at international level. Meanwhile, on 5 June 2015, Dijsselbloem announced he would seek a second term, prompting de Guindos saying he would mount a challenge. At a Eurogroup meeting in July 2015, Dijsselbloem picked up 10 votes, with the remaining countries subsequently deciding to vote unanimously for his second term.

In late 2015, de Guindos announced that Spain would have a budget deficit of less than 3 percent of GDP by 2016. However, after the country missed its 2015 public deficit target of 4.2 percent during months of fruitless coalition talks following inconclusive national elections, Rajoy and de Guindos signaled they were open to asking the European Commission for flexibility on the target. When the Commission eventually began formal disciplinary procedures against Spain and Portugal in 2016 for their excessive deficits in 2014 and 2015, de Guindos publicly promised that Spain would escape any sanctions from the European Union.

When Spain's acting Industry Minister José Manuel Soria resigned in April 2016 following allegations of links to offshore dealings which emerged after he was named in the Panama Papers, de Guindos took on Soria's brief alongside his current responsibilities. De Guindos continued to be in charge of the newly expanded portfolio in the second Rajoy Government from November 2016 on.

In 2017, de Guindos was widely seen as a natural successor to replace Jeroen Dijsselbloem as next chairman of the Eurogroup but he ruled himself out early in favour of an expected candidacy to become Vice-president of the European Central Bank. After Ireland withdrew the candidacy of Philip Lane in February 2018, German Finance Minister Peter Altmaier was one of the first among his peers to openly endorse de Guindos.

In March 2018, De Guindos finally left his position as Minister and Román Escolano replaced him. On 14 March 2018, a majority of the European Parliament endorsed him as new ECB Vice-president.

== Other activities ==
=== European Union organizations ===
- European Systemic Risk Board (ESRB), Ex-Officio Member
- European Investment Bank (EIB), Ex-Officio Member of the Board of Governors (2011-2018)
- European Stability Mechanism (ESM), Member of the Board of Governors (2012-2018)

=== International organizations ===
- African Development Bank (AfDB), Ex-Officio Member of the Board of Governors (2011-2018)
- Asian Development Bank (ADB), Ex-Officio Member of the Board of Governors (2011-2018)
- Central American Bank for Economic Integration (CABEI), Ex-Officio Member of the Board of Governors (2011-2018)
- European Bank for Reconstruction and Development (EBRD), Ex-Officio Member of the Board of Governors (2011-2018)
- Inter-American Investment Corporation (IIC), Ex-Officio Member of the Board of Governors (2011-2018)
- International Monetary Fund (IMF), Ex-Officio Member of the Board of Governors (2011-2018)
- Multilateral Investment Guarantee Agency (MIGA), World Bank Group, Ex-Officio Member of the Board of Governors (2011-2018)
- World Bank, Ex-Officio Member of the Board of Governors (2011-2018)

=== Research organizations ===
- ELCANO – Royal Institute for International and Strategic Studies, Member of the Board of Trustees

== Political positions ==
De Guindos, who is married with two children, is a practicing Roman Catholic. In September 2014, he attended the beatification of one of the leaders of the conservative Opus Dei movement. Yet in the press he has said he supports the right of gay people to marry and did not support the government's 2014 proposal to outlaw abortion.

During his second term in office, de Guindos rejected a potential bailout of troubled Banco Popular with public money.

Political offices
Preceded by Elena Salgado as Minister of Economy and Finance	Minister of Economy and Competitiveness; 2011–2018	Succeeded by Román Escolano
Government offices
Preceded by Vítor Constâncio	Vice-President of the European Central Bank; 2018–present	Incumbent
