= Ana Mato =

Spanish politician (born 1959)

Ana Mato Adrover
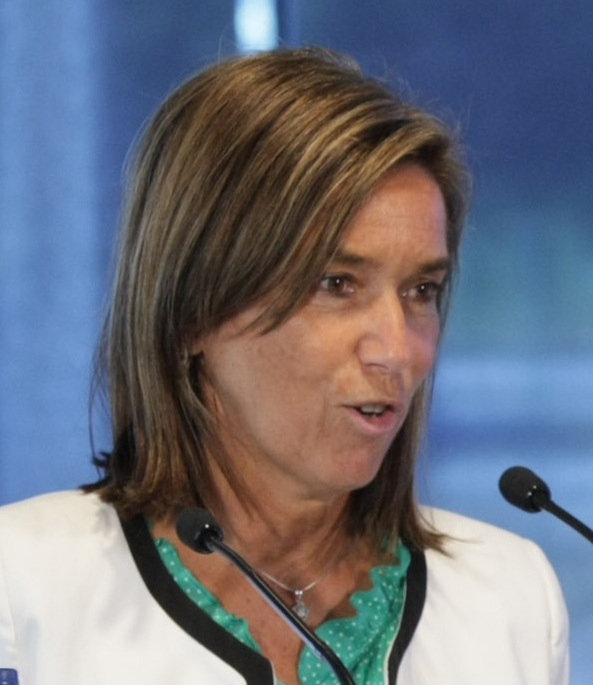

Minister of Health of Spain
- In office 22 December 2011 – 26 November 2014
- Prime Minister: Mariano Rajoy
- Preceded by: Leire Pajín
- Succeeded by: Soraya Sáenz de Santamaría (acting)

Personal details
- Born: 24 September 1959 (age 67) Madrid, Spain
- Party: PP
- Relations: Gabriel Mato (brother)
- Education: Complutense University of Madrid

Ana Mato Adrover (born 24 September 1959 in Madrid) is a Spanish politician. From 2011 to 2014 she served as Spain's Minister of Health, Social Services and Equality in the Rajoy Cabinet. On 26 November 2014 she resigned due to the involvement of herself and her husband Jesús Sepúlveda in the Gürtel case.

== Education ==
- Graduate in Political Science and Sociology, Complutense University of Madrid
- Lecturer and tutor at the Spanish National Distance Learning University (UNED)

== Career ==
A member of the National Executive Committee of the PP, she has been involved in Spanish national politics since the 1990s, when she was elected to the Spanish Congress.

Between 2004 and 2008 she served as a Member of the European Parliament. A member of the Bureau of the European People's Party, she sat on the European Parliament's Committee on Employment and Social Affairs. She was a substitute for the Committee on Regional Development and a member of the Delegation to the EU-Mexico Joint Parliamentary Committee.

- 1986-1990: Deputy director of the private office of the President of Castilla y León
- 1991-1993: Independent member of the Madrid Assembly
- National member of parliament for Madrid (1993-)
- 2000-2004: coordinator for local participation and action
- 2000-2004: spokeswoman on Communications and the Media (1983-1986), Transport, Infrastructure and Telecommunications (1986-2000) and Science and Technology
- 2003-2004: planning coordinator

== Decorations ==
- Medal of Merit for Telecommunications

== Controversies ==
In 2014 she attracted criticism for her handling of Ebola virus disease cases in Spain after the diagnosis of the first confirmed case of Ebola transmission outside Africa.

Ana Mato has been the subject of controversy regarding her alleged involvement in the Gürtel case, but for years she continued to receive the backing of Prime Minister Mariano Rajoy. She has maintained, with the support of her ex-husband, that she was unaware of the origin of gifts to her household, including cars and vacations, which have been identified in investigations into alleged corruption. On 26 November 2014, Ana Mato resigned as Minister of Health, Social Services and Equality after she was summoned to court as a "participant on a lucrative basis" in the alleged corruption crimes. She appeared in court in February 2017.

== See also ==
- 2004 European Parliament election in Spain
