= General State Budget =

The General State Budget (Spanish: Presupuestos Generales del Estado, PGE) comprises the spending and revenues of Spain's central government. The PGE is considered the most important act that a government enacts in a year and determine its policy in most areas, as well as being the basis on which the State's economy will move in that year.

== Basic aspects of the State budget ==
The basic aspects of the PGE are defined by article 134 of the Spanish Constitution of 1978.

The General State Budget are annual, include all the expenses and income of the state public sector and they are the amount of tax benefits that affect state taxes. Spain was a pioneer in terms of transparency in 1978 because of the introduction of this obligation with respect to tax benefits. Since these are equivalent to an indirect subsidy, they can be considered an expense and therefore must be included in the budget.

=== Preparation and approval ===
The preparation of the General State Budget is the responsibility of the Government, while its examination, amendment and approval is the responsibility of the Cortes Generales.

The Government must present before the Congress of Deputies the General State Budget at least three months before the expiration of those of the previous year. The objective is for the budget to be approved before December 31 of each year. If the Budgetary Act is not approved before the first day of the corresponding fiscal year, the Budget of the previous fiscal year are automatically carried over until the approval of the new ones. This extension has some exception: it does not affect credits approved for activities that ended in the year whose budget is extended. In practice, when a government does not get the parliamentary support to approve the budget, the most usual thing is the holding of early elections since it is very difficult to govern and make economic policy decisions with an extended budget.

=== Spending limit ===
The spending limit established in the budget is not absolute. Once the General State Budget has been approved, the Government may present bills that imply an increase in public spending or a decrease in revenues corresponding to the same budget year. These bills must be approved by parliament. The parliament can also present a proposal or amendment that supposes an increase of the credits (expense) or a decrease of the budgetary income, but this proposal requires the agreement of the Government for its processing.

=== Creation and modification of taxes ===
The Budget Act can not create taxes. This law can only modify them when a substantive tax law so foresees.

=== Budget stability ===
Article 135 of the Constitution, modified in 2011, establishes the principles of stability and budget sustainability. Among them it is established that the credits to pay the public debt are always present in the budget and are of absolute priority. This means that even if the budget does not include a forecast of expenditure in debt payment, if there are debts, the credit for that expense is automatically understood as being included in the budget in a virtual way by this article of the constitution. The principles established in this article are developed in the Organic Law of Budget Stability and Financial Sustainability.

The objective of budget stability is presented by the Government and is established every three years according to forecasts of economic growth. Each year a multi-year budget plan for three years must be drawn up in which the stability objective is taken into account.

== Budgets of the autonomous communities ==
The Spanish Constitution says nothing about how the budgets of the autonomous communities should be. The approval of autonomous budgets is not subject to any type of supervision by the General State Administration.

== Budgets of local administrations ==
Article 142 of the Constitution establishes that municipalities have financial autonomy. However, local administrations can not approve budgets. They only have the so-called tax ordinances, which do not have the status of law. Local taxes are regulated in the Regulating Act of the Local Treasuries, which establishes a minimum basis and gives the municipalities enough freedom to develop these bases.

The basic structure of local budgets, unlike that of regional governments, is established by the Government. Local entities can not present a budget deficit according to article 135 of the constitution.

== Management and sanction ==
The draft budget is prepared annually by the Ministry of Finance, through the Secretariat of State for Budget and Expenditure.

The draft project is approved by the Council of Ministers. Then, the Government presents them to the Congress of Deputies at least three months before the expiration of the fiscal year. The Congress of Deputies votes in the first place for its generic admission or the amendments to the totality, which, if successful, suppose their return to the Government. Once this procedure has been completed, the capacity for alteration due to partial amendments is subject to the non-alteration of the budget balance. Later, the Budget is sent to the Senate, which makes a second reading, but whose ability to alter them is very limited, with a final referral to Congress. Subsequently, they are sanctioned by Monarch and published in the Official State Gazette (BOE) with the rank of an ordinary law.

In the event that they are not approved, the extension of the previous year's budget is foreseen. Within the General Budget include those of Social Security, cultural heritage and other autonomous agencies. The budgets of the Autonomous Communities and the municipalities are organized independently, but they have to be subject to a common regulatory framework, for example in the setting of the public deficit. The legislation of the European Union, its budgets and the exchange of various payments and collections with the different Spanish public administrations, also imply different limitations of the national budget capacity and autonomy of Spain.

== See also ==
- Ministry of the Treasury and Public Function
- Ministry of Economy, Industry and Competitiveness
- 2016 Spanish General State Budget
