= Second government of Mariano Rajoy =

2016–2018 government of Spain

2nd government of Mariano Rajoy
- Government of Spain
- 2016–2018
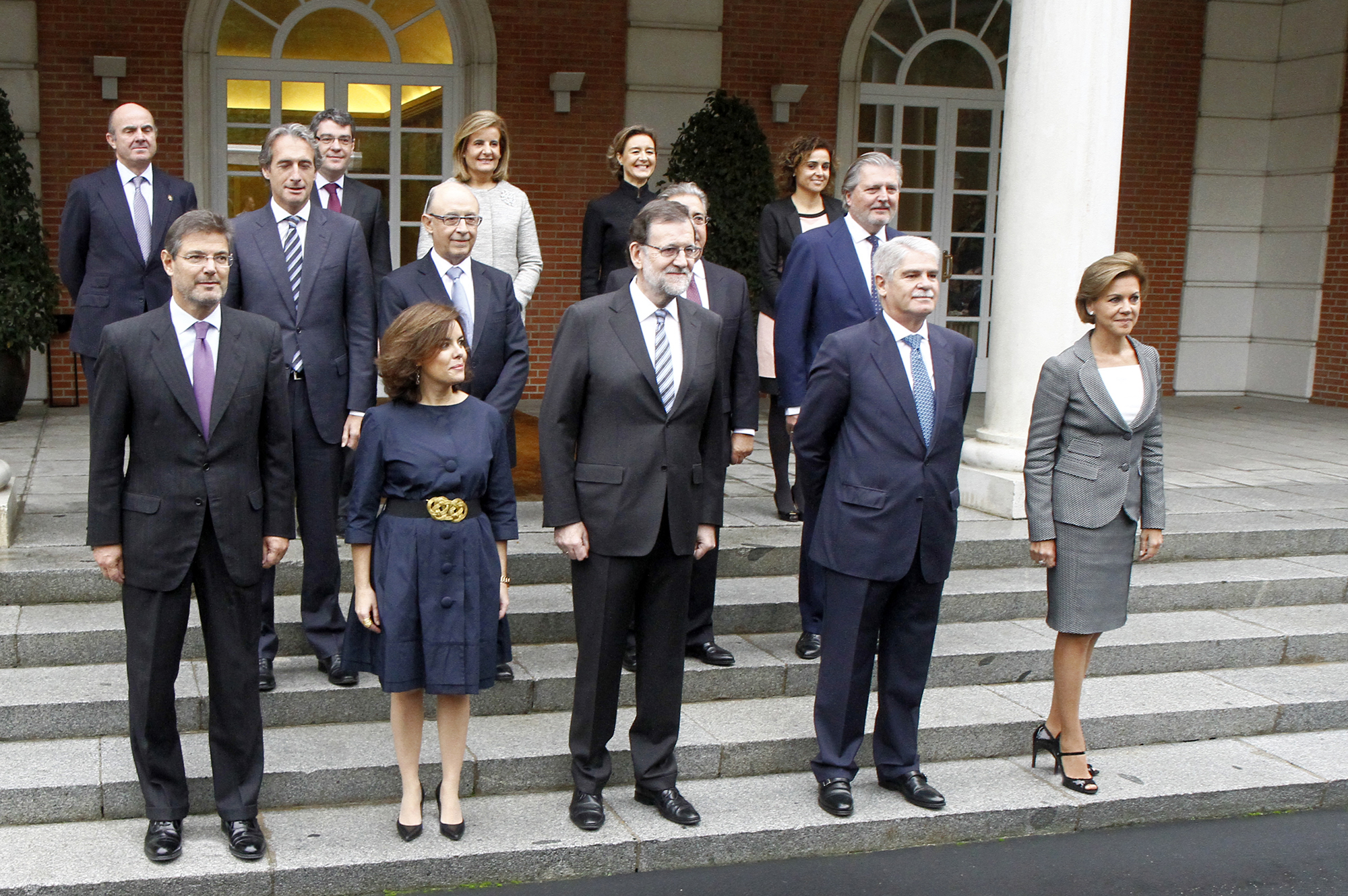
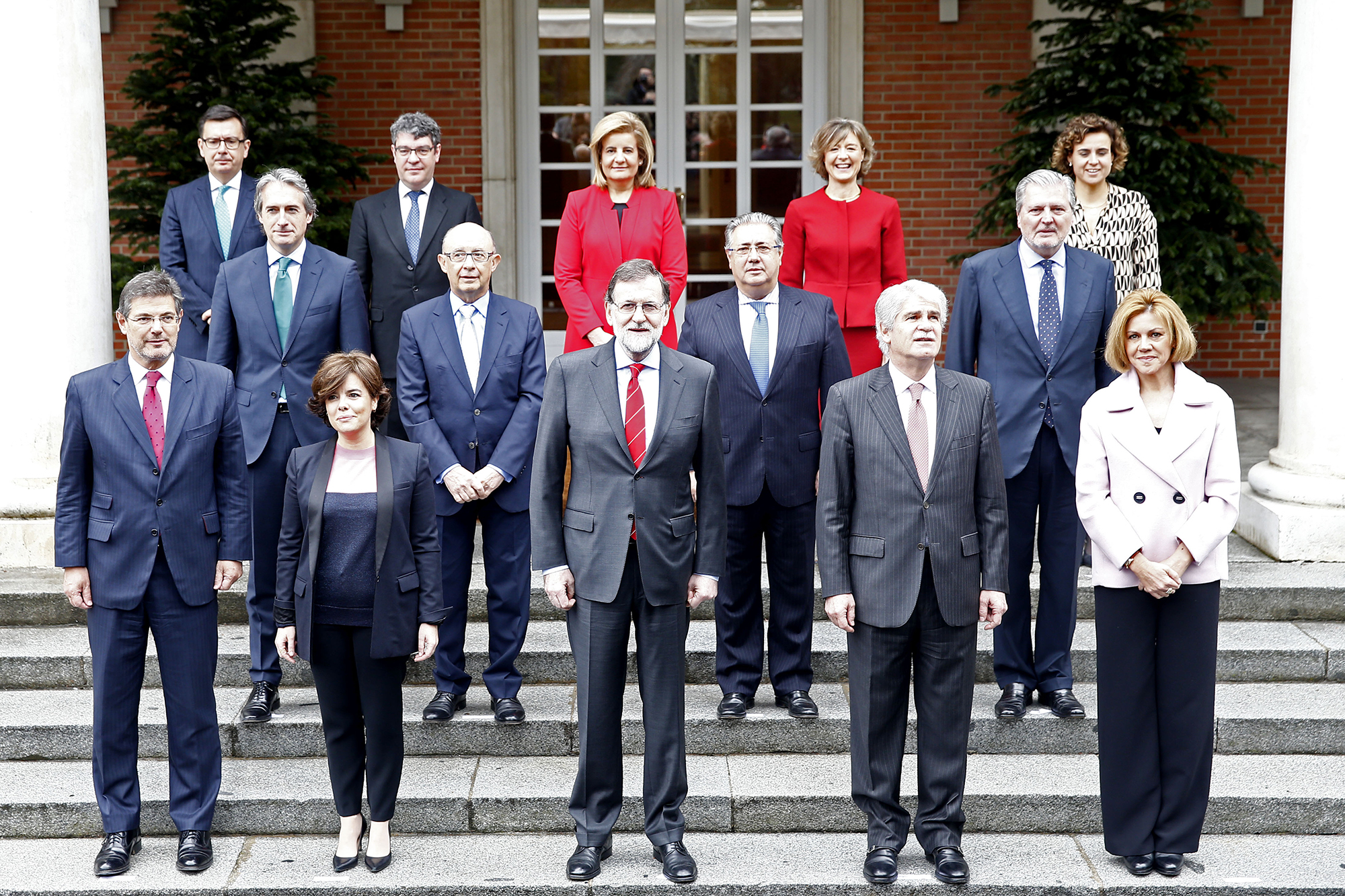
- The government in November 2016 (top) and March 2018 (bottom)
- Date formed: 4 November 2016
- Date dissolved: 7 June 2018

People and organisations
- Monarch: Felipe VI
- Prime Minister: Mariano Rajoy
- Deputy Prime Minister: Soraya Sáenz de Santamaría
- No. of ministers: 13 (Note: Does not include the prime minister.)
- Total no. of members: 14
- Member party: PP
- Status in legislature: Minority (single-party)
- Opposition party: PSOE
- Opposition leader: Pedro Sánchez (2017–2018)

History
- Incoming formation: 2015–2016 government formation
- Outgoing formation: 2018 vote of no confidence
- Election: 2016 general election
- Legislature term: 12th Cortes Generales
- Budget: 2017, 2018
- Predecessor: Rajoy I
- Successor: Sánchez I

The second government of Mariano Rajoy was formed on 4 November 2016, following the latter's election as prime minister of Spain by the Congress of Deputies on 29 October and his swearing-in on 31 October, as a result of the People's Party (PP) emerging as the largest parliamentary force at the 2016 Spanish general election. It succeeded the first Rajoy government and was the government of Spain from 4 November 2016 to 7 June 2018, a total of 580 days, or 1 year, 7 months and 3 days.

The cabinet comprised members of the PP and a number of independents. It was dismissed on 1 June 2018 when a motion of no confidence against Rajoy succeeded, but remained in acting capacity until Pedro Sánchez's government was sworn in.

== Investiture ==
Investiture; Congress of Deputies; Nomination of Mariano Rajoy (PP)
Ballot →	27 October 2016	29 October 2016
Required majority →	176 out of 350	Simple
Yes: • PP (134); • C's (32); • UPN (2); • CCa (1); • FAC (1)	170 / 350	170 / 350
No: • PSOE (84) (15 on 29 Oct); • UP–ECP–EM (67); • ERC (9); • PDeCAT (8); • PNV (5); • Compromís (4); • EH Bildu (2); • NCa (1)	180 / 350	111 / 350
Abstentions: • PSOE (68) (on 29 Oct)	0 / 350	68 / 350
Absentees: • PSOE (1) (on 29 Oct)	0 / 350	1 / 350

== Votes of confidence/no confidence ==
Motion of no confidence Congress of Deputies; Nomination of Pablo Iglesias Turrión (Podemos)
Ballot →	14 June 2017
Required majority →	176 out of 350
Yes: • UP–ECP–EM (67); • ERC (9); • Compromís (4); • EH Bildu (2)	82 / 350
No: • PP (134); • Cs (32); • UPN (2); • CCa (1); • FAC (1)	170 / 350
Abstentions: • PSOE (84); • PDeCAT (7); • PNV (5); • NCa (1)	97 / 350
Absentees: • PDeCAT (1)	1 / 350

Motion of no confidence Congress of Deputies; Nomination of Pedro Sánchez (PSOE)
Ballot →	1 June 2018
Required majority →	176 out of 350
Yes: • PSOE (84); • UP–ECP–EM (67); • ERC (9); • PDeCAT (8); • PNV (5); • Compromís (4); • EH Bildu (2); • NCa (1)	180 / 350
No: • PP (134); • Cs (32); • UPN (2); • FAC (1)	169 / 350
Abstentions: • CCa (1)	1 / 350
Absentees	0 / 350

== Cabinet changes ==
The only cabinet change of Rajoy's second government took place on 8 March 2018, when Luis de Guindos stepped down as Minister of Economy, Industry and Competitiveness in order to become Vice President of the European Central Bank. He was succeeded by Román Escolano.

== Council of Ministers ==
The Council of Ministers was structured into the offices for the prime minister, the deputy prime minister, 13 ministries and the post of the spokesperson of the Government.

← Rajoy II Government → (4 November 2016 – 7 June 2018)
Portfolio	Name	Party	Took office	Left office	Ref.
Prime Minister	Mariano Rajoy	PP	31 October 2016	1 June 2018	
Deputy Prime Minister; Minister of the Presidency and for Territorial Administrations	Soraya Sáenz de Santamaría	PP	4 November 2016	7 June 2018	
Minister of Foreign Affairs and Cooperation	Alfonso Dastis	Independent	4 November 2016	7 June 2018	
Minister of Justice	Rafael Catalá	PP	4 November 2016	7 June 2018	
Minister of Defence	María Dolores de Cospedal	PP	4 November 2016	7 June 2018	
Minister of Finance and Civil Service	Cristóbal Montoro	PP	4 November 2016	7 June 2018	
Minister of the Interior	Juan Ignacio Zoido	PP	4 November 2016	7 June 2018	
Minister of Development	Íñigo de la Serna	PP	4 November 2016	7 June 2018	
Minister of Education, Culture and Sports; Spokesperson of the Government	Íñigo Méndez de Vigo	PP	4 November 2016	7 June 2018	
Minister of Employment and Social Security	Fátima Báñez	PP	4 November 2016	7 June 2018	
Minister of Energy, Tourism and Digital Agenda	Álvaro Nadal	PP	4 November 2016	7 June 2018	
Minister of Agriculture and Fisheries, Food and Environment	Isabel García Tejerina	PP	4 November 2016	7 June 2018	
Minister of Economy, Industry and Competitiveness	Luis de Guindos	Independent	4 November 2016	8 March 2018	
Minister of Health, Social Services and Equality	Dolors Montserrat	PP	4 November 2016	7 June 2018	
=== Changes March 2018 ===
Portfolio	Name	Party	Took office	Left office	Ref.
Minister of Economy, Industry and Competitiveness	Román Escolano	Independent	8 March 2018	7 June 2018	

== Departmental structure ==
Mariano Rajoy's second government was organised into several superior and governing units, whose number, powers and hierarchical structure varied depending on the ministerial department.

Unit/body rank

- (■) Secretary of state
- (■) Undersecretary
- (■) Director-general
- (●) Autonomous agency
- (◆) Military & intelligence agency

Office (Original name)	Portrait	Name	Took office	Left office	Alliance/party	Ref.
=== Prime Minister's Office ===
Prime Minister (Presidencia del Gobierno)		Mariano Rajoy	31 October 2016	1 June 2018 (censored)	PP	
Prime Minister (Presidencia del Gobierno)	4 November 2016 – 19 June 2018: (■) Cabinet of the Prime Minister's Office–Chief of Staff; (■) Deputy Chief of Staff–Department of National Security; (■) Department of International Affairs; (■) Department of National Affairs; (■) General Secretariat of the Prime Minister's Office; (■) Coordinator Office for the Prime Minister's Affairs; (■) Department of Protocol; (■) Department of Security; (■) Economic Office of the Prime Minister; (■) Directorate-General of the Technical Secretariat of the Delegated Commission for Economic Affairs and for International Economic Affairs (disest. 30 Jul 2017); (■) Directorate-General of the Technical Secretariat of the Delegated Commission for Economic Affairs (est. 30 Jul 2017); (■) Directorate-General for Financial, Macroeconomic and Labour Policies; (■) State Secretariat for Press; (■) Directorate-General for Information Logistics (est. 30 Jul 2017); (■) Directorate-General for Communication					
Deputy Prime Minister (Vicepresidencia del Gobierno)		Soraya Sáenz de Santamaría	4 November 2016	7 June 2018	PP	
Deputy Prime Minister (Vicepresidencia del Gobierno)	See Ministry of the Presidency and for Territorial Administrations					
=== Ministry of Foreign Affairs and Cooperation ===
Ministry of Foreign Affairs and Cooperation (Ministerio de Asuntos Exteriores y de Cooperación)		Alfonso Dastis	4 November 2016	7 June 2018	PP (Independent)	
Ministry of Foreign Affairs and Cooperation (Ministerio de Asuntos Exteriores y de Cooperación)	12 November 2016 – 30 July 2017: (■) State Secretariat for Foreign Affairs; (■) Directorate-General for Foreign Policy and Security; (■) Directorate-General for the United Nations and Human Rights; (■) Directorate-General for the Maghreb, Africa, the Mediterranean and the Middle East; (■) Directorate-General for North America, Asia and the Pacific; (■) Directorate-General for International Economic Relations; (■) State Secretariat for the European Union; (■) Directorate-General for Coordination of Common Policies and General Affairs of the European Union; (■) Directorate-General for Bilateral Relations with European Union Countries, Candidate Countries and Countries of the European Economic Area; (■) State Secretariat for International Cooperation and for Ibero-America; (■) General Secretariat for International Cooperation for Development; (■) Directorate-General for Ibero-America; (■) Undersecretariat of Foreign Affairs and Cooperation; (■) Technical General Secretariat; (■) Directorate-General for the Foreign Service; (■) Directorate-General for Spaniards Abroad and Consular and Migratory Affairs; (■) Directorate-General for Media and Public Diplomacy; (■) Office for Diplomatic Information; (■) Introducer of Ambassadors; 30 July 2017 – 23 June 2018: (■) State Secretariat for Foreign Affairs; (■) Directorate-General for Foreign Policy and Security; (■) Directorate-General for the United Nations and Human Rights; (■) Directorate-General for the Maghreb, the Mediterranean and the Middle East; (■) Directorate-General for Africa; (■) Directorate-General for North America, Asia and the Pacific; (■) State Secretariat for European Affairs; (■) Directorate-General for Integration and Coordination of General Affairs of the European Union; (■) Directorate-General for Coordination of the Internal Market and other European Union Policies; (■) Directorate-General for Europe; (■) State Secretariat for International Cooperation and for Ibero-America and the Caribbean; (■) Directorate-General for Sustainable Development Policies; (■) Directorate-General for Ibero-America and the Caribbean; (■) Undersecretariat of Foreign Affairs and Cooperation; (■) Technical General Secretariat; (■) Directorate-General for the Foreign Service; (■) Directorate-General for Spaniards Abroad and Consular and Migratory Affairs; (■) Directorate-General for International Economic Relations; (■) Directorate-General for Diplomatic Communication and Information; (■) Introducer of Ambassadors					
=== Ministry of Justice ===
Ministry of Justice (Ministerio de Justicia)		Rafael Catalá	4 November 2016	7 June 2018	PP	
Ministry of Justice (Ministerio de Justicia)	12 November 2016 – 23 June 2018: (■) State Secretariat for Justice; (■) General Secretariat for the Administration of Justice; (■) Directorate-General for Relations with the Administration of Justice; (■) Office for Asset Recovery and Management; (■) Directorate-General for International Legal Cooperation and Relations with Religions; (■) Undersecretariat of Justice; (■) Technical General Secretariat; (■) Directorate-General for Registries and Notaries; (■) Office of the Solicitor General of the State–Directorate of the State Legal Service					
=== Ministry of Defence ===
Ministry of Defence (Ministerio de Defensa)		María Dolores de Cospedal	4 November 2016	7 June 2018	PP	
Ministry of Defence (Ministerio de Defensa)	12 November 2016 – 23 June 2018: (■) State Secretariat for Defence; (■) Directorate-General for Armament and Materiel; (■) Directorate-General for Economic Affairs; (■) Directorate-General for Infrastructure; (■) Undersecretariat of Defence; (■) Technical General Secretariat; (■) Directorate-General for Personnel; (■) Directorate-General for Military Recruitment and Teaching; (■) General Secretariat for Defence Policy; (■) Directorate-General for Defence Policy; (◆) Armed Forces; (■) Defence Staff–Chief of the Defence Staff; (■) Army–Chief of Staff of the Army; (■) Navy–Chief of Staff of the Navy; (■) Air Force–Chief of Staff of the Air Force					
=== Ministry of Finance and Civil Service ===
Ministry of Finance and Civil Service (Ministerio de Hacienda y Función Pública)		Cristóbal Montoro	4 November 2016	7 June 2018	PP	
Ministry of Finance and Civil Service (Ministerio de Hacienda y Función Pública)	12 November 2016 – 23 June 2018: (■) State Secretariat for Finance; (■) General Secretariat for Regional and Local Financing; (■) Directorate-General for Taxes; (■) Directorate-General for the Cadastre; (■) Central Economic-Administrative Court; (■) Directorate-General for the Regulation of Gambling; (■) State Secretariat for Budgets and Expenditure; (■) Office of the Comptroller General of the State Administration; (■) Directorate-General for Budgets; (■) Directorate-General for Personnel Costs and Public Pensions; (■) Directorate-General for Community Funds (disest. 29 Jul 2017); (■) Directorate-General for European Funds (est. 29 Jul 2017); (■) State Secretariat for the Civil Service; (■) General Secretariat for Digital Administration; (■) Directorate-General for the Civil Service; (■) Directorate-General for Public Governance; (■) Office for Conflicts of Interest; (■) Undersecretariat of Finance and Civil Service; (■) Technical General Secretariat; (■) Directorate-General for the State Heritage; (■) Inspectorate-General; (■) Directorate-General for Rationalization and Centralization of Contracting					
=== Ministry of the Interior ===
Ministry of the Interior (Ministerio del Interior)		Juan Ignacio Zoido	4 November 2016	7 June 2018	PP	
Ministry of the Interior (Ministerio del Interior)	12 November 2016 – 23 June 2018: (■) State Secretariat for Security; (■) Directorate-General of the Police; (■) Directorate-General of the Civil Guard; (■) General Secretariat for Penitentiary Institutions; (■) Directorate-General for International Relations and Foreigners; (■) Undersecretariat of the Interior; (■) Technical General Secretariat; (■) Directorate-General for Internal Policy; (■) Directorate-General for Traffic; (■) Directorate-General for Civil Protection and Emergencies; (■) Directorate-General for Support to Victims of Terrorism					
=== Ministry of Development ===
Ministry of Development (Ministerio de Fomento)		Íñigo de la Serna	4 November 2016	7 June 2018	PP	
Ministry of Development (Ministerio de Fomento)	12 November 2016 – 23 June 2018: (■) State Secretariat for Infrastructure, Transport and Housing; (■) General Secretariat for Infrastructure; (■) Directorate-General for Roads; (■) General Secretariat for Transport; (■) Directorate-General for Civil Aviation; (■) Directorate-General for the Merchant Marine; (■) Directorate-General for Land Transport; (■) Directorate-General for Architecture, Housing and Soil; (■) Undersecretariat of Development; (■) Technical General Secretariat; (■) Directorate-General for Economic Programming and Budgets; (■) Inspectorate-General of Development (disest. 11 Apr 2017); (■) Directorate-General for Organization and Inspection (est. 11 Apr 2017); (■) Directorate-General of the National Geographic Institute					
=== Ministry of Education, Culture and Sports ===
Ministry of Education, Culture and Sports (Ministerio de Educación, Cultura y Deporte)		Íñigo Méndez de Vigo	4 November 2016	7 June 2018	PP	
Ministry of Education, Culture and Sports (Ministerio de Educación, Cultura y Deporte)	12 November 2016 – 23 June 2018: (■) State Secretariat for Education, Vocational Training and Universities; (■) General Secretariat for Universities; (■) Directorate-General for Evaluation and Territorial Cooperation; (■) Directorate-General for Vocational Training; (■) Directorate-General for Educational Planning and Management; (■) State Secretariat for Culture; (■) Directorate-General for Cultural Industries and Books; (■) Directorate-General for Fine Arts and Cultural Heritage; (■) Undersecretariat of Education, Culture and Sports; (■) Technical General Secretariat; (●) High Council for Sports; (■) President's Office of the High Council for Sports; (■) Directorate-General for Sports					
=== Ministry of Employment and Social Security ===
Ministry of Employment and Social Security (Ministerio de Empleo y Seguridad Social)		Fátima Báñez	4 November 2016	7 June 2018	PP	
Ministry of Employment and Social Security (Ministerio de Empleo y Seguridad Social)	12 November 2016 – 23 June 2018: (■) State Secretariat for Employment; (■) Directorate-General for Employment; (■) Directorate-General for Self-Employment, the Social Economy and Corporate Social Responsibility; (■) State Secretariat for Social Security; (■) Directorate-General for Social Security Management; (■) Office of the Comptroller General of the Social Security; (■) General Secretariat for Immigration and Emigration; (■) Directorate-General for Migration; (■) Undersecretariat of Employment and Social Security; (■) Technical General Secretariat; (■) Directorate-General for Labour and Social Security Inspection (disest. 8 Apr 2018); (■) Directorate-General for Statistics and Socio-labour Analysis (est. 8 Jul 2017)					
=== Ministry of Energy, Tourism and Digital Agenda ===
Ministry of Energy, Tourism and Digital Agenda (Ministerio de Energía, Turismo y Agenda Digital)		Álvaro Nadal	4 November 2016	7 June 2018	PP	
Ministry of Energy, Tourism and Digital Agenda (Ministerio de Energía, Turismo y Agenda Digital)	12 November 2016 – 23 June 2018: (■) State Secretariat for Energy; (■) Directorate-General for Energy Policy and Mines; (■) State Secretariat for the Information Society and the Digital Agenda; (■) Directorate-General for Telecommunications and Information Technologies; (■) State Secretariat for Tourism; (■) Undersecretariat of Energy, Tourism and Digital Agenda; (■) Technical General Secretariat					
=== Ministry of Agriculture and Fisheries, Food and Environment ===
Ministry of Agriculture and Fisheries, Food and Environment (Ministerio de Agricultura y Pesca, Alimentación y Medio Ambiente)		Isabel García Tejerina	4 November 2016	7 June 2018	PP	
Ministry of Agriculture and Fisheries, Food and Environment (Ministerio de Agricultura y Pesca, Alimentación y Medio Ambiente)	12 November 2016 – 23 June 2018: (■) State Secretariat for Environment; (■) Directorate-General for Water; (■) Spanish Office for Climate Change; (■) Directorate-General for Environmental Quality and Evaluation and Natural Environment; (■) Directorate-General for Sustainability of the Coast and the Sea; (■) General Secretariat for Agriculture and Food; (■) Directorate-General for Agricultural Production and Markets; (■) Directorate-General for Health of Agricultural Production; (■) Directorate-General for Rural Development and Forest Policy; (■) Directorate-General for the Food Industry; (■) Undersecretariat of Agriculture and Fisheries, Food and Environment; (■) Technical General Secretariat; (■) Directorate-General for Services; (■) General Secretariat for Fisheries; (■) Directorate-General for Fisheries Management (disest. 21 Oct 2017); (■) Directorate-General for Fishery Resources and Aquaculture (disest. 21 Oct 2017); (■) Directorate-General for Fishery Resources (est. 21 Oct 2017); (■) Directorate-General for Fisheries Management and Aquaculture (est. 21 Oct 2017)					
=== Ministry of the Presidency and for Territorial Administrations ===
Ministry of the Presidency and for Territorial Administrations (Ministerio de la Presidencia y para las Administraciones Territoriales)		Soraya Sáenz de Santamaría	4 November 2016	7 June 2018	PP	
Ministry of the Presidency and for Territorial Administrations (Ministerio de la Presidencia y para las Administraciones Territoriales)	12 November 2016 – 23 June 2018: (■) State Secretariat for Relations with the Cortes; (■) Directorate-General for Relations with the Cortes; (■) State Secretariat for Territorial Administrations; (■) General Secretariat for Territorial Coordination; (■) Directorate-General for the Peripheral State Administration; (■) Directorate-General for Relations with the Autonomous Communities and the Local Entities; (■) Undersecretariat of the Presidency and for Territorial Administrations; (■) Technical General Secretariat–Government Secretariat; (■) Government Commissioner for the Demographic Challenge (est. 28 Jan 2017); (◆) National Intelligence Centre; (■) State Secretariat–Directorate of the National Intelligence Centre; (■) General Secretariat of the National Intelligence Centre; (■) Technical Directorate for Resources; (■) Technical Directorate for Intelligence; (■) Technical Directorate for Intelligence Support					
=== Ministry of Economy, Industry and Competitiveness ===
Ministry of Economy, Industry and Competitiveness (Ministerio de Economía, Industria y Competitividad)		Luis de Guindos	4 November 2016	8 March 2018	PP (Independent)	
Ministry of Economy, Industry and Competitiveness (Ministerio de Economía, Industria y Competitividad)		Román Escolano	8 March 2018	7 June 2018	PP (Independent)	
Ministry of Economy, Industry and Competitiveness (Ministerio de Economía, Industria y Competitividad)	12 November 2016 – 23 June 2018: (■) State Secretariat for Economy and Enterprise Support; (■) General Secretariat for the Treasury and Financial Policy; (■) Directorate-General for the Treasury; (■) Directorate-General for Economic Policy; (■) Directorate-General for Macroeconomic Analysis and International Economy; (■) Directorate-General for Insurance and Pension Funds; (■) State Secretariat for Trade; (■) Directorate-General for International Trade and Investments; (■) Directorate-General for Internal Trade (disest. 27 May 2017); (■) Directorate-General for Trade Policy and Competitiveness (est. 27 May 2017); (■) State Secretariat for Research, Development and Innovation; (■) General Secretariat for Science and Innovation; (■) Directorate-General for Research, Development and Innovation Policy; (■) General Secretariat for Industry and Small and Medium-sized Enterprises; (■) Directorate-General for Industry and Small and Medium-sized Enterprises; (■) Undersecretariat of Economy, Industry and Competitiveness; (■) Technical General Secretariat					
=== Ministry of Health, Social Services and Equality ===
Ministry of Health, Social Services and Equality (Ministerio de Sanidad, Servicios Sociales e Igualdad)		Dolors Montserrat	4 November 2016	7 June 2018	PP	
Ministry of Health, Social Services and Equality (Ministerio de Sanidad, Servicios Sociales e Igualdad)	12 November 2016 – 23 June 2018: (■) State Secretariat for Social Services and Equality; (■) Government Delegation for Gender Violence; (■) Directorate-General of Services for Families and Children; (■) Directorate-General for Disability Support Policies; (■) Government Delegation for the National Plan on Drugs; (■) Undersecretariat of Health, Social Services and Equality; (■) Technical General Secretariat; (■) General Secretariat for Health and Consumer Affairs; (■) Directorate-General for Public Health, Quality and Innovation; (■) Directorate-General for the Basic Catalogue of Services of the National Health System and Pharmacy; (■) Directorate-General for Professional Management					
=== Spokesperson of the Government ===
Spokesperson of the Government (Portavoz del Gobierno)		Íñigo Méndez de Vigo	4 November 2016	7 June 2018	PP	

== Notes ==
Preceded by Rajoy I	Government of Spain; 2016–2018	Succeeded by Sánchez I
