= Gabriel Mato =

Spanish politician (born 1961)

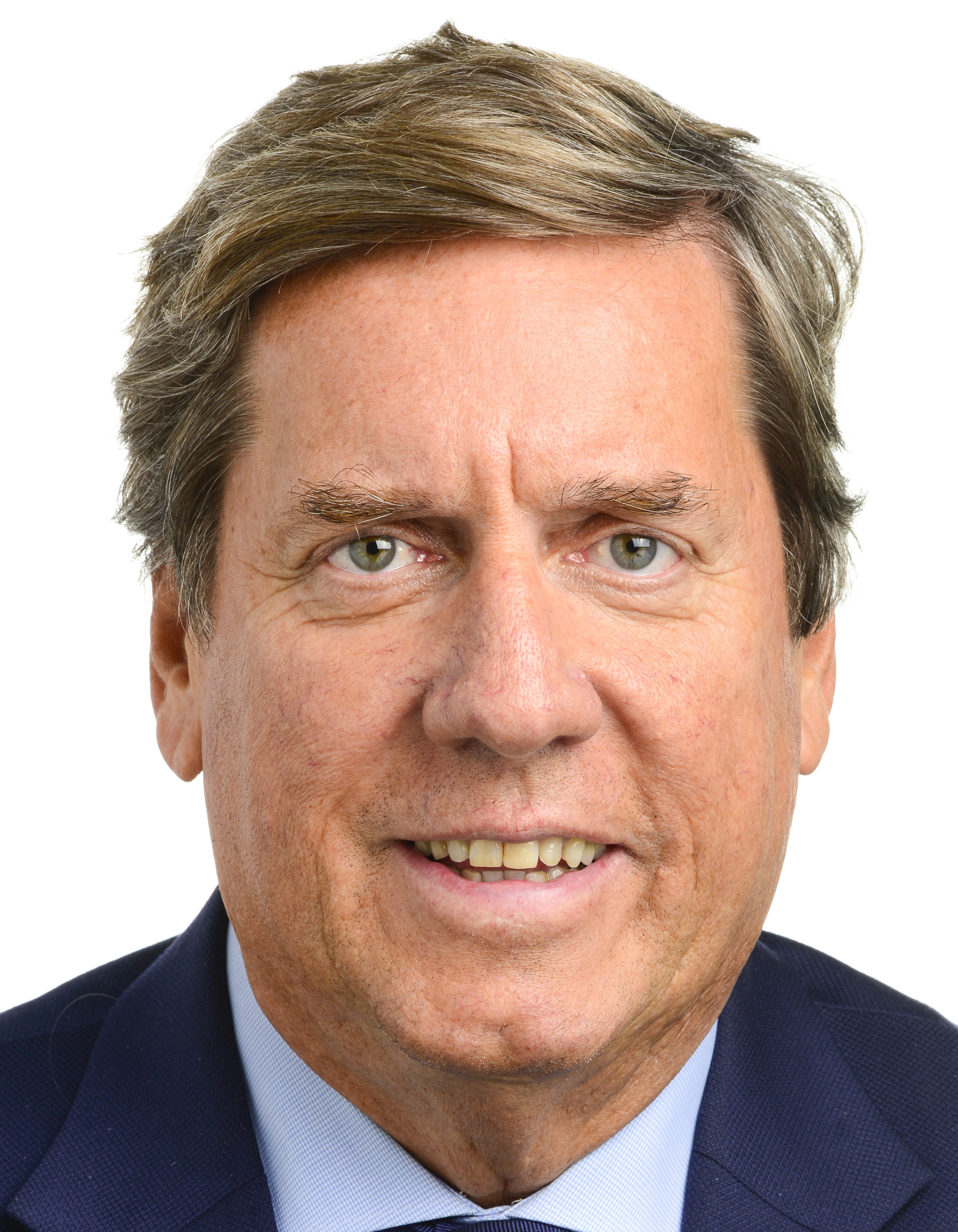

Gabriel Mato Adrover (pronounced [gaˈβɾjel ˈmato]; born 29 April 1961) is a Spanish People's Party politician. He has been a Member of the European Parliament since 2009.

== Biography ==
Born in Madrid, he graduated in Law from the Autonomous University of Madrid. He then moved to the Canary Islands to be a lawyer for the Cabildo insular (Island Council) of La Palma. In 1995, he was elected to the Parliament of the Canary Islands, and he served as the legislature's president from 2003 to 2007. From 2000 to 2003, he was an elected member of the Congress of Deputies.

He returned to Congress in the 2008 elections, serving until he was elected a Member of the European Parliament in 2009.

In September 2018, the EU voted on Article 7 to remove Hungary's voting rights as a sanction against Viktor Orbán's government. Mato was one of three PP members who broke party lines to vote against sanctions; the PP was abstaining on the vote while its European group, the European People's Party, voted in favour.

Mato was briefly out of office between the 2019 European Union election and the finalisation of Brexit in January 2020, when he was allocated one of the seats vacated by the UK.

== Personal life ==
His older sister Ana was also an MEP, for the same party.

Mato is passionate about tennis. He is a qualified umpire who has officiated at the Davis Cup, Wimbledon and Roland Garros. He holds the International Tennis Federation's gold badge, the highest qualification for the role.

In 2004, he was awarded the Grand Cross of the Order of Civil Merit by King Juan Carlos I.
