= Manuel Conthe =

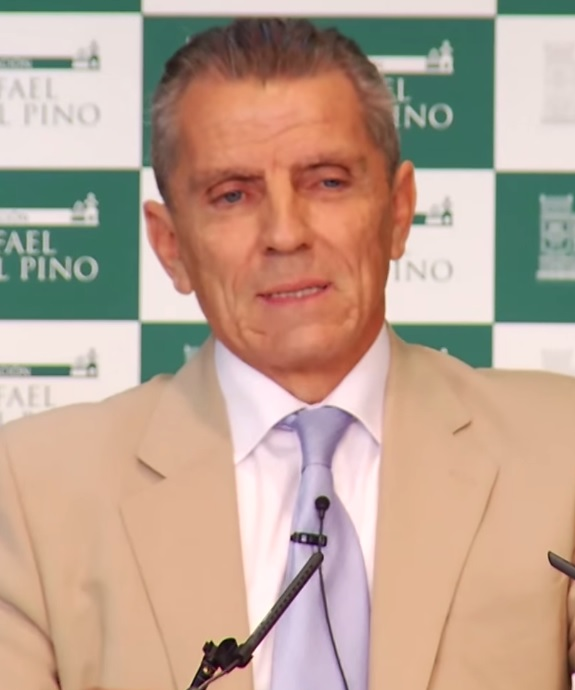
- Conthe in 2012.
- Born: Manuel Conthe Gutiérrez; 23 April 1954 (age 71); Madrid, Spain
- Education: Autonomous University of Madrid (Economics, 1974; Law, 1976)
- Occupations: International arbitrator Economist; Author
- Years active: 1979–present

Manuel Conthe Gutiérrez (born 23 April 1954) is a Spanish international arbitrator, economist and author. Having been the Secretary of State for the Economy from 1996 until 1997, he served from 2004 until 2007 as the head of the National Securities Market Commission.

== Biography ==
Conthe was born in Madrid in 1954 and graduated in Law in 1976 from the Autonomous University of Madrid. He became a commercial technician and state economist in 1979.

From 1988 until 1995, Conthe was the Director-General for the Treasury, serving under Felipe González and José María Aznar. He swapped to becoming the Secretary of State for the Economy from 1995 until 1996. Between 1999 and 2002 he was the vice-president of the Finance section of the World Bank and later worked for the consultancy firm Analistas Financieros Internacionales. He was also a regular economics columnist for newspaper such as Expansión and El País.

Conthe was unveiled as the president of the National Securities Market Commission in 2004. He resigned on 2 April 2007 in protest at the Commission's decision not to sanction Enel and Acciona for their underhand tactics in their tender offer for Endesa.

In September 2009, he started to work as an of-counsel lawyer at Bird & Bird. In 2015 he became an economics assessor for Ciudadanos.

== Personal life ==
Conthe has published two books. The first, El mundo al revés ("The world upside-down") details economic games, paradoxes and dilemmas. After his resignation from the NSMC in 2007 he published La paradoja del bronce: Espejismos y sorpresas en el mundo de la economía y la política.

He is married with three daughters. His second daughter, Paula, followed him into economics and has been the Director-General for the Treasury since 2024.
