= Ministry of Economy (Spain) =

Government ministry of Spain

Ministry of Economy, Trade and Enterprise
- Ministerio de Economía, Comercio y Empresa

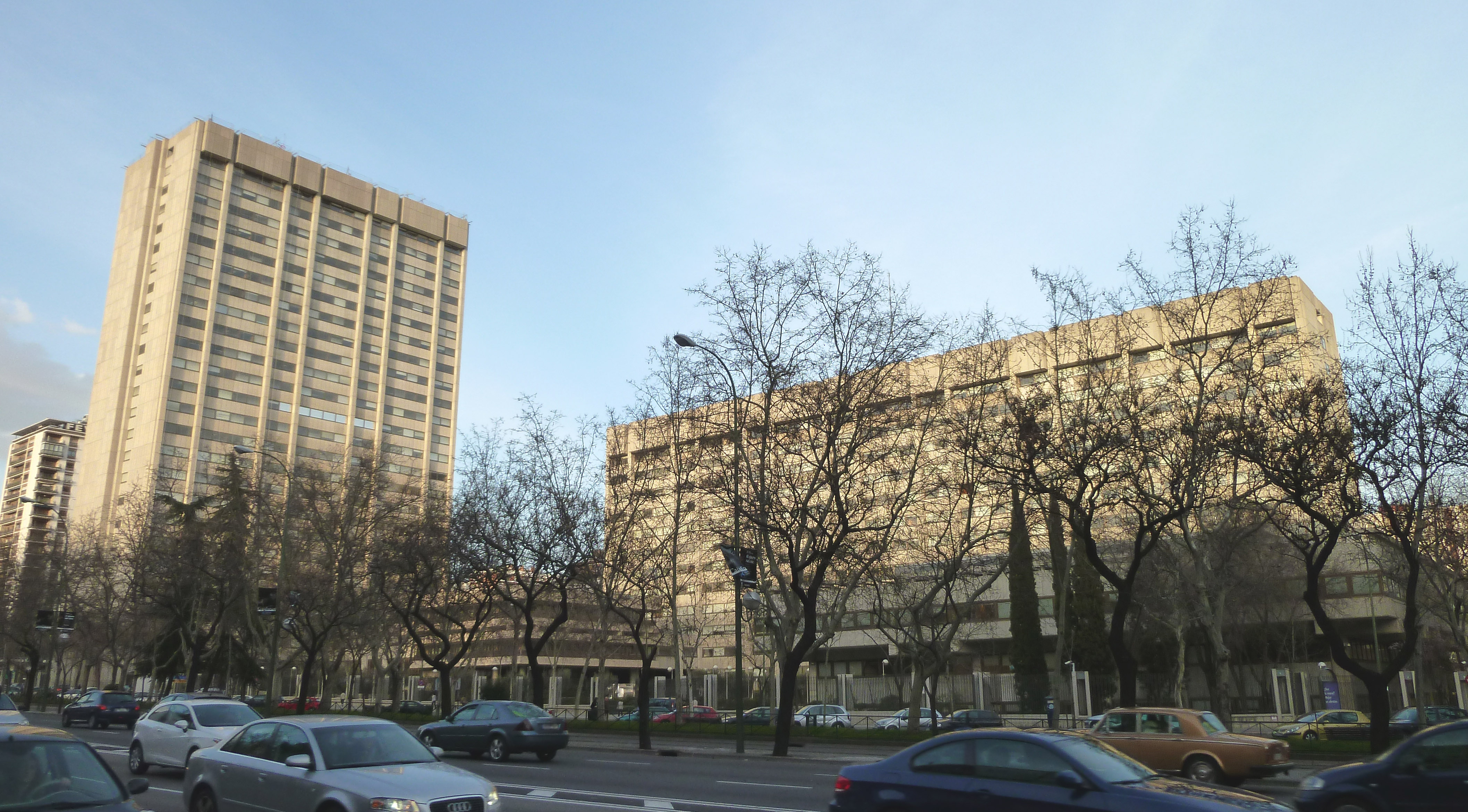
- Headquarters of the Ministry near the Nuevos Ministerios government complex

Agency overview
- Formed: 4 July 1977; 49 years ago (as Ministry of Economy)
- Preceding agency: Ministry of Finance
- Type: Ministry
- Jurisdiction: Spanish government
- Employees: 5,385 (2024)
- Annual budget: € 6.2 billion, 2026
- Minister responsible: Carlos Cuerpo, Minister
- Agency executives: Israel Arroyo Martínez, Secretary of State for Economy and Business Support; Amparo López Senovilla, Secretary of State for Trade; Paula Conthe Calvo, Secretary-General for the Treasury; Aida Fernández González, Under-Secretary
- Website: Ministry of Economy, Trade and Enterprise(in Spanish)

The Ministry of Economy, Trade and Enterprise (MINECO) is the department of the Government of Spain responsible for proposing and carrying out the government policy on economic affairs, through reforms to improve competitiveness and trade, focused on business support and the potential growth of the economy. At the same time, it directs the commercial policy of internationalization of companies, as well as the supervision of investments and foreign transactions.

As the main Cabinet department responsible for the economic policy, it is also the ministry in charge of the proper functioning of the oldest and most relevant Delegated Committee, the Government Delegated Committee for Economic Affairs (CDGAE), a collective body of the Government in charge of guaranteeing the full coordination and coherence of the government policies with the economic policy. The Economy Minister chairs this committee, while the Secretary of State for Economy assumes the secretariat.

The MINECO is headed by the Economy Minister, a Cabinet member who is appointed by the Monarch at request of the Prime Minister. The Minister of Economy is assisted by four high-ranking officials, the Secretary of State for Economy and Enterprise Support, the Secretary of State for Trade, the Secretary-General for the Treasury and International Financing and the Under-Secretary of Economy. The current minister is Carlos Cuerpo, a State economist and former Secretary-General for the Treasury.

== History ==
=== Origin and protectionism ===
The responsibilities over the economy had been integrated in the Ministry of the Treasury since its creation in the 18th century. However, because of the weakness and the deficiencies of the Spanish industry and trade sectors, during the dictatorship of Miguel Primo de Rivera was needed an autarchic policy. In addition, after the World War I the complexity of international markets had plunged Spain into a strong industrial crisis.

As a result, the sectors affected demanded a protectionist tariff policy in defense of national production against foreign one and, in turn, make it easy the exports. Thus began an autarchic policy based on economic nationalism and tariff protectionism whose best example is the Cambó tariff of 1922. This policy was assumed by the dictatorship of Primo de Rivera. Thus a certain economic bonanza was achieved that was truncated by the Great Depression of 1929.

The Cambo tariff was the technical and fiscal response to the critical deficit situation of the Spanish trade balance since 1920. It was a tariff policy that served two competing needs: one was to protect the different sectors of the Spanish economy against the international, heavily taxing imports of products produced by foreign counterparts; another responded to the need to defend export agriculture, a sector with a large foreign market and which was damaged by the rise in tariffs, victim of the consequent increases in the countries affected by the Spanish measures.

This was solved with the signing of international treaties of Commerce and Navigation agreeing a particular and significant reduction of the tariff with each one of the foreign nations with which commercial exchanges took place. Flores de Lemus defined the situation that was lucidly created: there was a complementarity between export agriculture and agriculture and industry in need of protection, although the instruments used by the Government were opposed and a continuous tension was created between them.

In the aftermath of the Spanish Civil War and throughout the Francoist period, economic policy remained heavily centralized and interventionist, but by 1959 the limitations of strict autarky prompted the government to implement the Stabilization Plan, which opened the economy to foreign investment, reduced tariffs and state controls, and laid the groundwork for industrial modernization. Over the next two decades this “Spanish miracle” fostered rapid growth, particularly in tourism, construction and manufacturing—but also led to regional imbalances and inflationary pressures. With the transition to democracy in the late 1970s, these challenges spurred the creation in 1977 of a standalone Ministry of Economy and Trade, entrusted with coordinating fiscal, monetary and trade policies in line with evolving European Community norms.

==== Dictatorship, Republic and Civil War ====
Although remote antecedents of the Economy portfolio can be found in the creation of the Ministry of Supply as an immediate consequence of the crisis of 1917; The first step towards the creation of a specific department occurred during the dictatorship of Primo de Rivera when the National Economy Council established by Royal Decree of 8 March 1924.

The council was born with the purpose of studying the problems of the national production and consumption, for the purpose of setting the customs tariffs and determining the way to establish international commercial relations adapted to the Spanish economic reality. For this reason, its main functions were to collect statistics on foreign trade and cabotage; obtain economic and commercial information in Spain and abroad; establish the official valuation of the goods, taking into account the cost of the same; propose new customs tariffs, as well as the revision of nomenclatures and tariffs. It was also responsible for proposing the conclusion of Trade Agreements. Finally, this body served to control all pressure groups in the country and thus channel their antagonistic interests: Boards and chambers of Commerce, Industry and Navigation, associations of producers, employers' organizations and trade unions of all kinds.

The end of the Military Directorate in 1925, the restoration of the ministerial regime and the economic circumstances led to the creation of the Ministry of National Economy (despite its name, it is today the Ministry of Industry) by Royal Decree-Law of 3 November 1928, in response to public opinion that this affairs required to be placed under one direction only, both in terms of production, trade and consumption; and that to date they were dispersed among the rest of the government departments. The National Economy Council depended on the new Economy Ministry, although slightly modified, continuing with its work of collecting and contrasting the realities of the country around each and every one of the sectors of his economic life. By Decree of 16 December 1931, the department was renamed as Ministry of Agriculture, Industry and Trade.

In the middle of the Civil War, the government of the Republic created a Ministry of Finance and Economy, first based in Barcelona and then in Valencia. The head of the new institution was Juan Negrín, who at the same time was Prime Minister. Its creation was ordered by Decree of 17 May 1937 and its functions and structure were dictated by Decree 27 of that same month.

==== From the economic autarky to the developmentalism of the 1960s ====
The catastrophic situation in which the country was plunged after the Civil War and the collapse of international markets caused by the World War II, led to the creation of a new National Economy Council. The new body monitored that all ministries follow the economic guidelines of the Government in a harmonious and coordinated manner. His legal regime constituted him as an autonomous body of work, consultant, adviser and technician in all the matters that affected the national economy making it dependent on the Office of the Prime Minister.

The importance of the council will be increased, so much that institutionally its president will be compared to those of the Cortes, the Supreme Court, the Court of Auditors and the Council of State. Its power and influence in economic matters, always oriented towards autarky, will be equal to that of the General Secretariat of the Movement. Finally, the president of the council had the rank of Minister without portfolio. Its connection to the most immobile sector of the regime in terms of economy will mean the beginning of its decline. Confronted openly with the Ministries of the Treasury and Commerce for the turn that the Stabilization Plan had made towards a capitalist economy, the National Economy Council gradually began to lose importance in the 1960s. It disappeared in 1977, absorbed by the Ministry of Economy.

During the premiership of Arias Navarro, a specific Deputy Prime Minister was created for economic affairs, a position that was assumed by the head of the Treasury portfolio. The new position implied the disappearance of the Ministry of Development Planning, leaving its Undersecretariat ascribed to the Delegate Commission of the Government for Economic Affairs.

=== Democracy: the Ministry ===
Despite all that, the department that we know today was created in 1977, named Ministry of Economy. Its creation took place in conjunctural circumstances and of great importance for the economic history of Spain. Once the political transition to democracy began, the second government presided over by Suarez was aware that the constitutional process would be seriously hampered if there was no economic growth. The circumstances were totally contrary due to the serious situation that the country was going through due to the oil crisis of 1973, the ineffectiveness of the measures adopted by the last governments of the dictatorship; as well as the accentuation of the latent problems: inflation, unemployment, external deficit, deficit of the public sector and the low level of investments.

The institutional solutions involved remodeling the General State Administration, creating a Second Deputy Prime Minister for economic affairs and the position of Minister of Economy through several royal decrees signed on 4 July 1977, appointments that fall in Fuentes Quintana. The Ministry, created to group in a single department the different competences in the matter of organization and economic planning and to be able to single out the decisions on economic policy extracting them in part from the Ministry of the Treasury. Its main task was to establish the guidelines of the general economic policy, the short and medium term programming and the study of the proposal of advisable measures to ensure the smooth running of the economy of the country.

To carry out is new duties, the department was structured through a Secretariat of State, an Undersecretariat, a Technical General Secretariat and four directorates-general, one for design the economic policy of the government, other to study and analyse the economic policy and its effects, other one to study the economiy and forecast and a fourth one for finance policy and supervision of banking entities. Most of those bodies were newly created and others were transferred from the Ministry of Finance and the Ministry of the Presidency. The new ministry also assumed the statistical powers of the government through the National Statistics Institute.

The administrative reforms carried out by the first government headed by Felipe González led in 1982 to the merger in one of the departments of Treasury and Economy and Commerce, giving birth to the Ministry of Economy and Finance. This body has continued to operate continuously with the exception of the 7th Cortes Generales (2000–2004), under the premiership of José María Aznar, in which the Treasury and Economy portfolios were split in two. The same happens since the 10th Cortes Generales (2011–present). Between 2016 and 2018, the Ministry of Economy merged with the Ministry of Industry.

Since 2018 the Ministry's remit has expanded and contracted in response to shifting policy priorities and external shocks. In October 2018 it merged briefly with Industry, only to revert in 2020 to a stand-alone Economy portfolio as Spain confronted the economic fallout of the COVID-19 pandemic. Tasked with designing and implementing measures such as furlough schemes (ERTEs), liquidity guarantees for businesses and direct support to strategic sectors, the Ministry also became Spain's lead coordinator for the EU's Recovery and Resilience Facility, channeling over €69 billion into national programmes for green transition, digitalisation and social cohesion.

== Organization ==
Organizational chart of the Spanish Ministry of Economy, April 2024

The minister of economy, a member of the Council of Ministers, is the most senior official of the Ministry of Economy, Trade and Business. As such, the minister establishes the government policy on these areas and appoint the competent government officials.

To exercise its responsibilities, the minister is assisted by two secretaries of state. One of them is responsible for economic and financial affairs, while the other implements the government's national and international trade policy. Also, there is an under-secretary, who assists the minister in the daily management of the ministry.

As of 2026, this is the organization of the Ministry:

Ministry Organization (2026)
Minister	Cabinet
Minister	Deputy Directorate-General for European Funds
Minister	Macroprudential Authority-Financial Stability Council
Secretary of State for Economy and Business Support	General Secretariat for the Treasury and International Financing
Secretary of State for Economy and Business Support	Directorate-General for the Treasury and Financial Policy
Secretary of State for Economy and Business Support	Directorate-General for International Financing
Secretary of State for Economy and Business Support	Directorate-General for Economic Policy
Secretary of State for Economy and Business Support	Directorate-General for Economic Analysis
Secretary of State for Economy and Business Support	Directorate-General for Insurance and Pension Funds
Secretary of State for Economy and Business Support	SEPBLAC
Secretary of State for Economy and Business Support	National Statistics Institute
Secretary of State for Economy and Business Support	Official Credit Institute
Secretary of State for Economy and Business Support	National Agency for Public Policy Evaluation
Secretary of State for Trade	Directorate-General for Economic and Trade Intelligence
Secretary of State for Trade	Directorate-General for Trade Policy and Economic Security
Secretary of State for Trade	Spanish Office for the Reconstruction of Ukraine
Secretary of State for Trade	Spanish Institute for Foreign Trade
Secretary of State for Trade	Economic and Trade Offices Network
Under-Secretary	Technical General Secretariat
Under-Secretary	Deputy Directorate-General for Human Resources
Under-Secretary	Inspectorate of Services
Under-Secretary	Deputy Directorate-General for Financial and Administrative Affairs
Under-Secretary	Deputy Directorate-General for ICT
Under-Secretary	Budget Office
Under-Secretary	Deputy Directorate-General for Communication
Under-Secretary	Institute for Accounting and Accounts Audit

=== Independent agencies ===
The following independent agencies maintain institutional relations with the Government through this department:

- The National Commission on Markets and Competition (CNMC).
- The National Securities Market Commission (CNMC).
- The Fondo de Reestructuración Ordenada Bancaria (FROB).

== Headquarters ==
The Ministry's headquarters are located in the city of Madrid. Specifically, the department is housed in the Tower of the Cuzco Complex (162 Paseo de la Castellana), a government compound that the ministry shares with the Ministry of Industry and Tourism and the Ministry of Science, Innovation and Universities, as well as with some services of the Ministry for Ecological Transition and the Demographic Challenge.

In addition to its main headquarters, the Ministry owns several buildings on the Paseo del Prado, which house the offices of the Public Treasury, the Official Credit Institute, and SEPBLAC; and a building at 44 Paseo de la Castellana, which houses the Directorate-General for Insurance and Pension Funds. Furthermore, agencies such as the National Statistics Institute and the Accounting and Auditing Institute also have their own headquarters.

== Budget ==
In millions of euros (€)
1. Electrical system compensations 3,514.1 (56.9%)
2. Trade policy 1,595.4 (25.8%)
3. Treasury and public debt management 581 (9.41%)
4. Economic and general statistics and analysis 215 (3.48%)
5. Postal Service compensation 110 (1.78%)
6. Economic regulation and supervision 91.7 (1.48%)
7. Administration and general services 69.4 (1.12%)

For fiscal year 2026, the Ministry of Economy, Trade and Business has a consolidated budget of €6.2 billion. Of this amount, €2.3 billion are directly managed by the ministry's central services while €3.9 billion are managed by its agencies.

The budget can be divided in seven main areas:

1. Administration and general services (Programs 923Q & 92KA), covering the Ministry’s central services and administrative structure.
2. Electrical system compensations (425A), which funds the deficits and imbalances of the electricity system. It is managed by the National Commission on Markets and Competition.
3. Treasury and public debt management (923O & 923P), covering treasury operations, public debt management and international financial relations.
4. Economic and general statistics and analysis (923C & 931M), which finance official statistics and economic policy analysis.
5. Trade policy (43MD, 43ME, 431A, 431N & 431O), aimed to promote national and international trade, and business internationalisation.
6. Economic regulation and supervision (492M, 493M & 493O), which funds economic regulatory agencies.
7. Postal Service compensation (491N), which compensates the public enterprise Correos for the net cost of providing the Universal Postal Service.

In addition, Programme 000X (“Internal Transfers and Disbursements”) is excluded from the analysis, as it consists of transfers between public sector entities and would otherwise lead to double counting and distort the overall budget.

=== Audit ===
The Ministry's accounts, as well as those of its agencies, are internally audited by the Office of the Comptroller General of the State (IGAE), through a Delegated Comptroller's Office within the Department itself. Externally, the Court of Auditors is responsible for auditing expenditures.

Likewise, the Congress of Deputies Committee on Economy, Trade and Digital Transformation and the Senate Committee on Economy, Trade and Business, exercise political control over the accounts.

== List of officeholders ==
Office name:

- Ministry of Economy (1977–1980; 2000–2004)
- Ministry of Economy and Trade (1980–1982)
- Ministry of Economy and Competitiveness (2011–2016)
- Ministry of Economy, Industry and Competitiveness (2016–2018)
- Ministry of Economy and Business (2018–2020)
- Ministry of Economic Affairs and Digital Transformation (2020–2023)
- Ministry of Economy, Trade and Business (2023–present)

Portrait	Name (Birth–Death)	Term of office			Party	Government	Prime Minister (Tenure)	Ref.
Portrait	Name (Birth–Death)	Took office	Left office	Duration	Party	Government	Prime Minister (Tenure)	Ref.
	Enrique Fuentes Quintana (1924–2007)	5 July 1977	25 February 1978	235 days	Independent	Suárez II	Adolfo Suárez (1976–1981)	
	Fernando Abril Martorell (1936–1998)	25 February 1978	6 April 1979	1 year and 40 days	UCD	Suárez II	Adolfo Suárez (1976–1981)	
	José Luis Leal (born 1939)	6 April 1979	9 September 1980	1 year and 156 days	UCD	Suárez III	Adolfo Suárez (1976–1981)	
	Juan Antonio García Díez (1940–1998)	9 September 1980	7 October 1980	2 years and 85 days	UCD	Suárez III	Adolfo Suárez (1976–1981)	
	Juan Antonio García Díez (1940–1998)	7 October 1980	27 February 1981	2 years and 85 days	UCD	Suárez III	Adolfo Suárez (1976–1981)	
	Juan Antonio García Díez (1940–1998)	27 February 1981	3 December 1982	2 years and 85 days	UCD	Calvo-Sotelo	Leopoldo Calvo-Sotelo (1981–1982)	
	Miguel Boyer (1939–2014)	3 December 1982	8 December 1982	5 days	PSOE	González I	Felipe González (1982–1996)	
Office disestablished during this interval. (Note: The department's competences were transferred to the Ministry of Economy and Finance between 1982 and 2000.)
	Rodrigo Rato (born 1949)	28 April 2000	18 April 2004	3 years and 356 days	PP	Aznar II	José María Aznar (1996–2004)	
Office disestablished during this interval. (Note: The department's competences were transferred to the Ministry of Economy and Finance between 2004 and 2011.)
	Luis de Guindos (born 1960)	22 December 2011	4 November 2016	6 years and 76 days	Independent	Rajoy I	Mariano Rajoy (2011–2018)	
	Luis de Guindos (born 1960)	4 November 2016	8 March 2018	6 years and 76 days	Independent	Rajoy II	Mariano Rajoy (2011–2018)	
	Román Escolano (born 1965)	8 March 2018	7 June 2018	91 days	Independent	Rajoy II	Mariano Rajoy (2011–2018)	
	Nadia Calviño (born 1968)	7 June 2018	13 January 2020	5 years and 205 days	Independent	Sánchez I	Pedro Sánchez (2018–present)	
	Nadia Calviño (born 1968)	13 January 2020	21 November 2023	5 years and 205 days	Independent	Sánchez II	Pedro Sánchez (2018–present)	
	Nadia Calviño (born 1968)	21 November 2023	29 December 2023	5 years and 205 days	Independent	Sánchez III	Pedro Sánchez (2018–present)	
	Carlos Cuerpo (born 1980)	29 December 2023	Incumbent	2 years and 316 days	Independent	Sánchez III	Pedro Sánchez (2018–present)	
