= Cristóbal Montoro =

Spanish politician

The Most Excellent Cristóbal Montoro
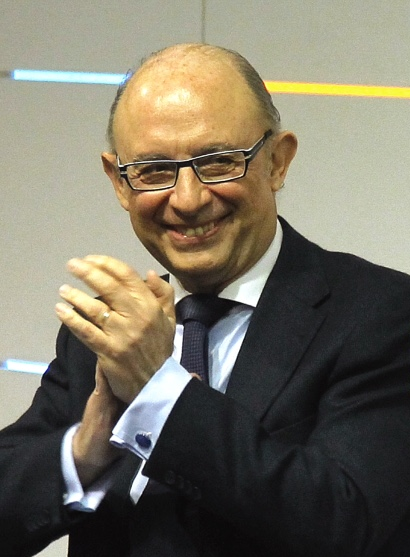
- Montoro in 2015.

Minister of Finance of Spain (Note: Minister of Finance from 2000 to 2004, Minister of Finance and Public Administrations from 2011 to 2016 and Minister of Finance and Civil Service from 2016 to 2018.)
- In office 22 December 2011 – 1 June 2018
- Monarchs: Juan Carlos I (2011–2014); Felipe VI (2014–2018)
- Prime Minister: Mariano Rajoy
- Preceded by: Elena Salgado (Finance); Manuel Chaves (Public Administration)
- Succeeded by: María Jesús Montero (Finance); Meritxell Batet (Civil Service)
- In office 28 April 2000 – 17 April 2004
- Monarch: Juan Carlos I
- Prime Minister: José María Aznar
- Preceded by: Rodrigo Rato
- Succeeded by: Pedro Solbes

Secretary of State for Economy of Spain
- In office 20 July 1996 – 31 March 2000
- Monarch: Juan Carlos I
- Prime Minister: José María Aznar
- Preceded by: Manuel Conthe
- Succeeded by: José Folgado

Member of the Congress of Deputies
- In office 13 January 2016 – 21 May 2019
- Constituency: Madrid
- In office 1 April 2008 – 13 December 2011
- Constituency: Madrid
- In office 28 March 2000 – 2 July 2004
- Constituency: Jaen
- In office 21 June 1993 – 28 May 1996
- Constituency: Madrid

Member of the European Parliament
- In office 20 July 2004 – 1 April 2008
- Constituency: Spain

Personal details
- Born: 28 July 1950 (age 75) Cambil, Spain
- Party: People's Party (until 2025)
- Education: Autonomous University of Madrid (Economics, until 1973; Doctorate until 1981)

Cristóbal Ricardo Montoro Romero (born 28 July 1950 in Cambil) is a Spanish economist and former People's Party politician. He served as Minister of Finance from 2000 until 2004, as Minister of Finance and Public Administration from 2011 until 2016 and as Minister of Finance and the Civil Service from 2016 until 2018.

He represented Madrid in the Congress of Deputies from 1993 until 1996 and again from 2016 until 2019, when he announced that he would not stand in the April 2019 election. He also represented Jaén from 2000 until 2004, and Seville from 2011 until 2016.

His first government position was as Secretary of the State of the Economy in José María Aznar's first government, in which he was a strong supporter of Spain joining the Eurozone. After Aznar's government was reelected in 2000, he became the Finance Minister, succeeding Rodrigo Rato in Aznar's first government.

Montoro returned to his former post under Mariano Rajoy's first and second governments, albeit slightly restructured compared to the 2000s. He left office when the PP government fell in 2018.

== European Parliament ==
The PP lost the 2004 Spanish general election and Montoro was elected as a Member of the European Parliament for the People's Party. He sat on the European Parliament Committee on Economic and Monetary Affairs.

He was a substitute for the Committee on Budgets, a member of the Delegation for relations with the countries of the Andean Community and a substitute for the Delegation to the ACP-EU Joint Parliamentary Assembly.

== Return to Spanish Congress ==
He returned to Congress in 2008, serving as the Popular Party spokesperson on the economy until the party returned to power in 2011. In the first government of Mariano Rajoy, Montoro served as the Minister of Finance and Public Administration.

In the second government of Mariano Rajoy, which began in 2016, he occupied a similar position as Minister of Finance and the Civil Service (his ministry was restructured in a cabinet reshuffle).

== Retirement ==
In 2019, Montoro did not stand for re-election to Congress.

In July 2025, Montoro unexpectedly returned to the spotlight when the media reported on allegations that while he was a minister in the People's Party government, a consultancy firm linked to him had received up to €11 million from energy companies. The firm in question was founded in 2006. It is said to have maintained direct access to Montoro after 2008, when he sold his shares in the business and ostensibly severed ties. While the money was filed as consultancy payments, reports suggested that the money could have been used to lobby the Rajoy government. It was further alleged that he had used civil servants in the Spanish Tax Agency and elsewhere as part of a "network of influence".

Montoro resigned from the PP, yet political scientists suggested that the scandal could still hurt his former party, which had criticised the PSOE in relation to the Koldo case, a corruption scandal which was generating headlines in 2025.

== Education ==
- 1973: Graduate in Economics from the Autonomous University of Madrid (UAM), he obtained the "Extraordinary Award"
- 1981: Doctor in economics (UAM)

== Career ==
- 1982-1988: Assistant lecturer in public finance (UAM, 1973–1982) and Deputy professor
- since 1989: Professor of public finance at the University of Cantabria
- Economist and director of studies
- 1996-2000: Member of the Boards of Directors of Telefónica, Iberia, Endesa and SEPI
- since 1999: Member of the National Executive Committee of the PP
- 1993–1996, 2000–2004, 2008-present: Member of the Congress of Deputies.
- 1996-2000: Secretary of State for the Economy
- 1996-2000: Spain's representative to various economic and financial organisations
- 2000-2004: Minister of the Treasury
- 2011-2016: Minister of the Treasury and Public Administrations
- 2016–2018: Minister of the Treasury and Civil Service

== Decorations ==
- Knight Grand Cross of the Royal and Distinguished Order of Charles III
- Knight Grand Cross of the Order of Isabella the Catholic

== See also ==
- Ministry of Economy and Finance of Spain
- Spanish Government

== Notes ==
Political offices
Preceded by Rodrigo Rato	Minister of Finance; 2000–2004	Succeeded by Pedro Solbes
Preceded by Elena Salgado as Minister of Economy and Finance	Minister of Finance and Public Administrations; 2011–2018	Succeeded by María Jesús Montero as Treasury Minister; Meritxell Batet as Minister of Territorial Policy and Civil Service
