= Román Escolano =

Spanish economist

The Most Excellent Román Escolano
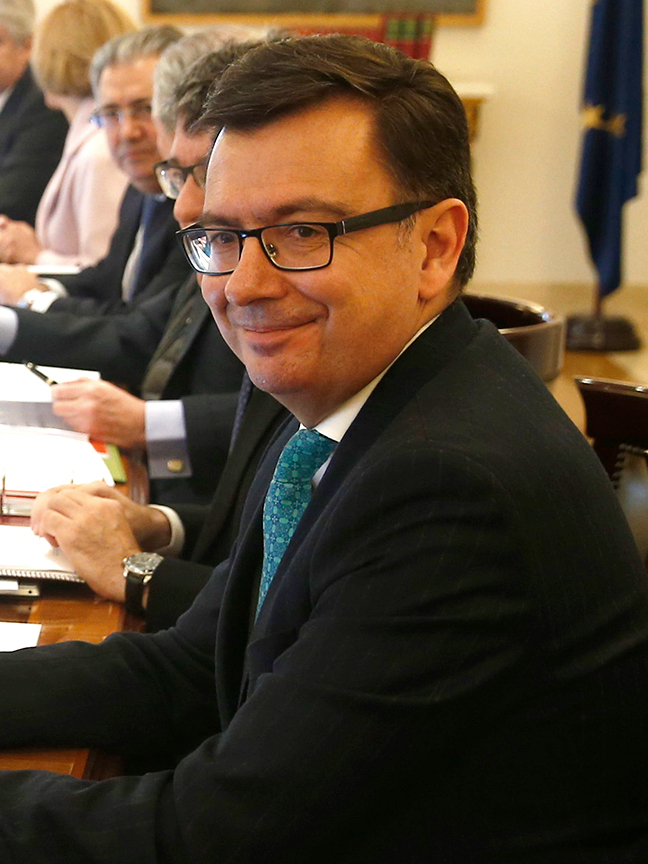

Minister of Economy, Industry and Competitiveness
- In office 7 March 2018 – 1 June 2018
- Prime Minister: Mariano Rajoy
- Preceded by: Luis de Guindos
- Succeeded by: Nadia Calviño Economy; Reyes Maroto Industry

Vice President of the European Investment Bank
- In office 1 September 2014 – 7 March 2018
- Preceded by: Magdalena Álvarez
- Succeeded by: Emma Navarro

President of the Official Credit Institute
- In office 5 January 2012 – 29 August 2014
- Prime Minister: Mariano Rajoy
- Preceded by: José María Ayala Vargas
- Succeeded by: Irene Garrido Valenzuela

Personal details
- Born: 1965 (age 60–61) Zaragoza, Spain
- Party: People's Party
- Education: Autonomous University of Madrid

Román Escolano Olivares (born 1965 in Zaragoza) is a Spanish economist. He was Minister of Economy, Industry and Competitiveness of Spain in 2018 for 3 months until the approval of the motion of no-confidence against Rajoy. He was also vice president of the European Investment Bank between 2014 and 2018.

== Biography ==
Born in 1965 in Zaragoza, in northeastern Spain, Escolano worked at the EIB since 2014. At EIB, Escolano was part of the Management Committee, the body responsible for designing the bank's financial and loan policies and managing its daily activity. He was responsible for supervising the operations and activities of the EIB in Spain, Portugal, the Maghreb countries and Latin America. Internally, he monitored different control functions such as Risk Management and the application of best banking practices. He was also the chairman of the Supervisory Board of the Marguerite Fund, a pan-European venture capital fund.

Prior to that, Escolano headed the Spanish Official Credit Institute from 2012 to 2014. He also served as chief economic adviser to the then-Prime-Minister Jose Maria Aznar from 2000 to 2004. He worked in the private sector as Director of Institutional Relations of the BBVA bank.

In March 2018, he was appointed Minister of Economy, Industry and Competitiveness by Prime Minister Rajoy. He was forced out of office after the approval of the motion of no-confidence in the Rajoy's government.

== Other activities ==
=== European Union organizations ===
- European Investment Bank (EIB), Ex-Officio Member of the Board of Governors (2018)
- European Stability Mechanism, Member of the Board of Governors (2018)

=== International organizations ===
- Central American Bank for Economic Integration (CABEI), Ex-Officio Member of the Board of Governors (2018)
- European Bank for Reconstruction and Development (EBRD), Ex-Officio Member of the Board of Governors (2018)
- Inter-American Investment Corporation (IIC), Ex-Officio Member of the Board of Governors (2018)
- International Monetary Fund (IMF), Ex-Officio Member of the Board of Governors (2018)
- Multilateral Investment Guarantee Agency (MIGA), World Bank Group, Ex-Officio Member of the Board of Governors (2018)
- World Bank, Ex-Officio Member of the Board of Governors (2018)

== Personal life ==
Escolano is married and has three children.

== See also ==
- European Investment Bank
- BBVA
- Ministry of Economy, Industry and Competitiveness

Political offices
Preceded by Luis de Guindos	Minister of Economy and Competitiveness; 2018	Succeeded by Nadia Calviño
