= Isabel García Tejerina =

Spanish politician (born 1968)

Isabel García Tejerina MP
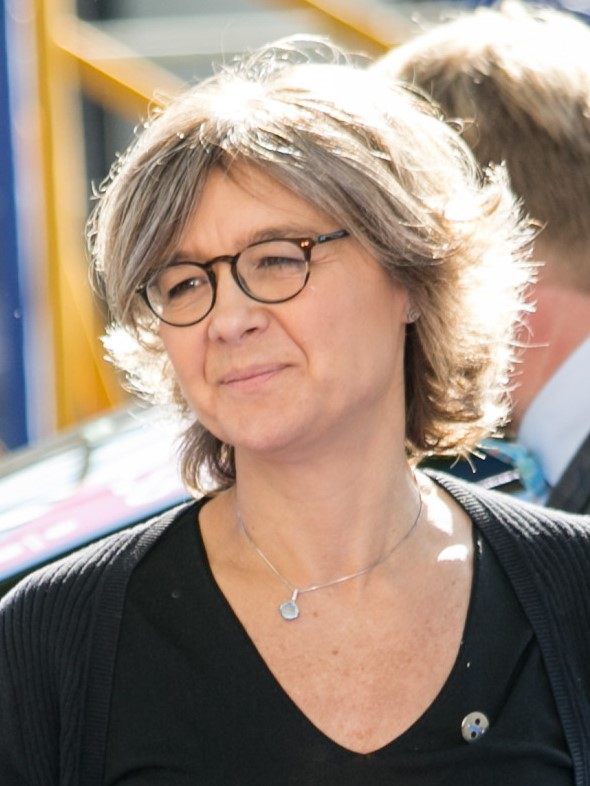

Minister of Agriculture, Fisheries, Food and Environment of Spain
- In office 28 April 2014 – 1 June 2018
- Prime Minister: Mariano Rajoy
- Preceded by: Miguel Arias Cañete
- Succeeded by: Luis Planas (Agriculture); Teresa Ribera (Ecological Transition)

Personal details
- Born: 9 October 1968 (age 57) Valladolid, Spain
- Party: People's Party
- Education: Technical University of Madrid and University of Valladolid

Isabel García Tejerina (Valladolid, 9 October 1968) is a Spanish politician of the PP.

== Early life and education ==
García Tejerina has a Master's from University of California, Davis in Agricultural Economy, a Bachelor's in Law from the University of Valladolid and a degree in agricultural engineering from the Technical University of Madrid.

== Political career ==
García Tejerina served as General Secretary of Agriculture and Feeding of Spain for two periods: from April 2000 to April 2004 and from February 2012 to April 2014. She was Spain's Minister of Agriculture, Fishers, Food and Environment from 28 April 2014 until 1 June 2018, when a vote of no-confidence against Mariano Rajoy ousted the government. Her re-appointment caused some criticism by Spanish environmentalists.

== Other activities ==
- Iberdrola, Independent Member of the Board of Directors (since 2021)
