= Spanish Foreign Service =

Spain's diplomatic service

The Spanish Foreign Service (Spanish: Servicio Exterior del Estado, lit. 'State Foreign Service') is the set of the bodies, administrative units and human and material resources that, under the direction and coordination of the Government, implement the foreign policy of Spain. As of 2026, the Foreign Service consisted of more than 7,900 employees.

The Foreign Service is integrated by career diplomats of the Ministry of Foreign Affairs and the staff posted abroad from other government departments, mainly the Ministry of Education and the Ministry of Economy, Trade and Business. The Spanish Agency for International Development Cooperation (AECID), attached to the Foreign Ministry, is also one of the main actors of this service.

== Foreign Service and Foreign Action ==
According to the Law 2/2014, of March 25, on the State's Foreign Action and Service (LASEE), both terms are similar but not the same. Foreign Action is all that actions made by Spanish institutions, regardless of its administrative level or territorial scope, that have an impact abroad, while the Foreign Service is the set of resources of the Spanish central government focused on implementing the government's foreign policy. This means, that other administrations and constitutional bodies different from the central government may establish their own foreign action, although it must comply with the LASEE and with the guidelines, purposes and objectives established by the central government as supreme director of the country's foreign policy.

== Organization ==
The State Foreign Service is entrusted with the task of providing the necessary analytical and assessment elements for the Government to design and implement its Foreign Policy, to develop its Foreign Action, and to coordinate all actors involved; as well as promoting and defending Spain's interests abroad. Likewise, it is responsible for providing assistance and protection to Spaniards abroad, as well as supporting Spanish companies in foreign markets (LASEE § 41).

To meet this purposes, the Foreign Service is organized as follows:

- Permanent Diplomatic Missions and Representations. They are the main element of the Foreign Service, representing Spain on an ongoing basis before other States or international organizations. The head of this type of missions is an Ambassador Extraordinary and Plenipotentiary, and they are responsible for all the diplomatic and civil personnel. As a general rule, ambassadors must be members of the diplomatic service, although the government may use its discretionary power to appoint ambassadors from outside the diplomatic service (LASEE § 44).
- Special Diplomatic Missions and Delegations. Known as Ambassadors in Special Mission or Special Ambassadors (ambassadors-at-large), they temporarily represent Spain before one or more countries, with its consent, for a specific task, or before one or more countries where there is no permanent Diplomatic Mission or before all countries, for a task of a special nature. There may also be Delegations, which represent Spain in an international organization or conference, or at a specific event. These delegations may be headed by the Monarch, the Prime Minister, the Foreign Minister, or another authority (LASEE § 46).
- Consular Offices. They give protection to Spaniards abroad and assist them in several administrative issues, such as the issuance of diplomatic documents, electoral assistance or civil registration, among others. There are two types of consulates: career or honorary. Career consulates are headed by a member of the diplomatic service, while honorary consulates —which have limited powers— are managed voluntarily by civilians and without salary. There may also be consular agents, career diplomats who assume certain responsibilities of a consulate in another location (LASEE § 48).

=== Joint diplomatic posts ===
The Government is also authorized to create joint diplomatic missions with the European External Action Service or with those of its member States. This posts may be Joint Diplomatic Missions, Joint Consular Offices, Cultural Offices, Sectorial Offices or the integration of Spanish staff into existing European delegations (LASEE § 48-49).

Similarly, the Government is authorized to create, within the framework of the Ibero-American Community of Nations (Spanish: Comunidad Iberoamericana de Naciones), joint sectoral offices or the reciprocal incorporation of officials into the respective diplomatic missions (LASEE § 52).

=== Under-Secretary and Director-General ===
Within the central organization of the Ministry of Foreign Affairs, those directly responsible for the management of the Foreign Service are the Under-Secretary of Foreign Affairs and the Director-General for the Foreign Service.

The Under-Secretary of Foreign Affairs is the head of the Diplomatic Service and has the rank and honours of ambassador. The under-secretary assists the minister in everything related to foreigners, consular affairs and protection of Spaniards abroad. The under-secretary is assisted by the Director-General for the Foreign Service, who manages the Foreign Service's human resources, internal regulations, economic and financial management, contracting, works and furnishings, management control, planning and IT support, and communications.

== Other components of the Foreign Service ==
Several government departments have, within the Spanish diplomatic missions around the world, their own Offices (Spanish: Consejerías) to manage or represent specific interests (mainly, education, trade and economic). Two of the most relevant are those of the Ministry of Education and the Ministry of Economy.

=== Foreign Education Action ===
In the case of the Ministry of Education, it has the Foreign Education Action (Spanish: Acción Educativa Exterior, AEE), an educational program abroad integrated by 134 bodies in 54 countries around the world to promote Spanish language and culture. This also includes education centers, with full or shared ownership.

Foreign Education Action Units
Type	Location	Amount
Education Office	Embassies to: Andorra, Argentina, Australia, Belgium, Brazil, Bulgaria, China, France, Germany, Italy, Morocco, Mexico, Poland, Portugal, Switzerland the United Kingdom and the United States. Special Offices: one for the OECD, UNESCO and CoE (located in Paris) and another for the European Union (located in Brussels).	19
Education Attaché	Brazil (2), Canada, Colombia, Czech Republic, Hungary, Romania, Russia, Slovakia and the United States (4)	13
Technical Advisory Office	Australia (2), Austria, Brazil (3), Canada (2), India, Ireland, Ivory Coast, New Zealand, the Netherlands, the Philippines, Scotland, Sweden, Thailand, Latvia, United Arab Emirates, and the United States (11).	29
Programs Directorate	Equatorial Guinea	1
Educational Resource Centre	Argentina, Australia, Belgium, Brazil, Bulgaria, Canada (4), China, the Czech Republic, Germany, Hungary, Italy, Luxembourg, Morocco, Mexico, the Netherlands, Poland, Portugal, Romania, Russia (2), Slovakia, Switzerland, Tunisia the United Kingdom and the United States (12).	39
School (full ownership)	Morocco (10), France (2), Andorra, Colombia, Italy, Portugal, United Kingdom and the Western Sahara.	18
School (host shared ownership)	Miguel de Cervantes Hispano-Brazilian School (São Paulo) and Spanish Park School (Rosario)	2
School (EU shared ownership)	Belgium (5), Germany (3), Italy, Luxembourg (2), the Netherlands and Spain	13
TOTAL AEE Network		134

=== Economic and Trade Offices Network ===
Spain's Economic and Trade Offices.

The Ministry of Economy, Trade and Business, through the Secretariat of State for Trade, has an extensive international network of offices focused on promoting Spanish business. As of 2026, it was composed by 107 Economic and Trade Officies. They are part of the corresponding embassy or permanent representation.

This network belonged to the Ministry of Foreign Affairs until the beginning of the 20th century. Since then, new economic ministries assumed the responsibilities over international trade, creating in 1929 the position of trade attaché in the Ministry of National Economy and, in 1930, a new specialized corp of trade experts. Nowadays, the offices are integrated by Economic and Trade Counsellors that are freely appointed by the minister of economy among members of the High Corps of Spanish State Economists and Trade Experts (LASEE § 45).

== Foreign Service staff ==
To be considered part of the Foreign Service, the public employee must to be occupying an official post within a Diplomatic Mission or Representation, or in a Consulate [LASEE § 54(2)]. If the Spanish employee is posted in a European delegation or a joint diplomatic post, it will only be considered Spanish Foreign Service staff if they occupies a position provided for in the staffing table of the General State Administration [LASEE § 54(3)].

If they need general or specific training, it is provided by the Diplomatic School.

As of January 2026, the State Foreign Service consisted of over 7,900 people. This includes:

Government department	Staff
Agriculture, Fisheries and Food	55
Foreign Affairs, European Union and Cooperation	4,814
Spanish Agency for International Development Cooperation	460
Science, Innovation and Universities	10
Defence	74
Economy, Trade and Business	634
Education, Vocational Training and Sports	1296
Finance	21
Inclusion, Social Security and Migration	4
Social Institute for Sea Workers	4
Industry and Tourism	176
Territorial Policy and Democratic Memory	4
Presidency, Justice and Relations with the Cortes	70
Labour and Social Economy	264
Ecological Transition and Demographic Challenge	9
Transport and Sustainable Mobility	5
TOTAL	7,896

=== How to join ===
Positions in the Foreign Service are publicly advertised by each responsible ministry, outlining the duties, time of service, salary, location, and requirements, and they are freely appointed from among the candidates who meet the requirements of the post. These jobs can be for career civil servants —regulated by administrative law— or for contract staff —general labour law— [LASEE § 54(1)]. After appointment, they must be accredited by the Ministry of Foreign Affairs [LASEE § 57(3)].

In the case of civil servants, there are two Corps of civil servants that monopolize the positions:

- Diplomatic and Consular Corps. Career diplomats and consuls occupy the main foreign service positions.
- High Corps of Spanish State Economists and Trade Experts. This corps are attached to the Ministry responsible for trade affairs and have exclusively reserved the positions of Counsellors of the Economic and Trade Offices.

== See also ==
- Diplomatic ranks in the Spanish Foreign Service
- Foreign relations of Spain
- List of diplomatic missions of Spain
- European External Action Service
