= Rafael Catalá =

Spanish politician (born 1961)

The Most Excellent Rafael Catalá
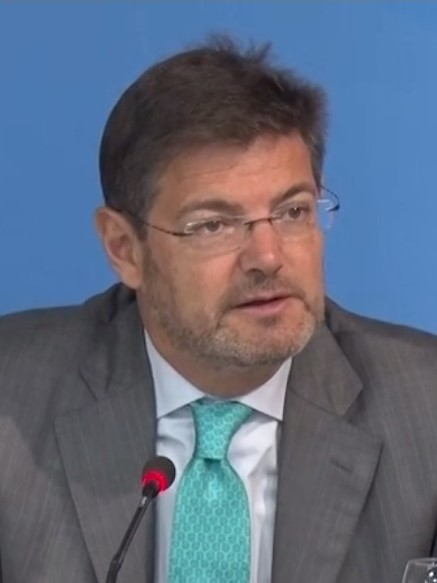
- Catalá in 2015

Minister of Justice First Notary of the Kingdom
- In office 29 September 2014 – 1 June 2018
- Prime Minister: Mariano Rajoy
- Preceded by: Alberto Ruiz-Gallardón
- Succeeded by: Dolores Delgado

Minister of Public Works Interim
- In office 19 July 2016 – 4 November 2016
- Preceded by: Ana Pastor Julián
- Succeeded by: Íñigo de la Serna

Member of the Congress of Deputies
- In office 13 January 2016 – 21 May 2019
- Constituency: Cuenca

Personal details
- Born: Rafael Catalá Polo; 21 June 1961 (age 64) Madrid, Spain
- Party: PP

Rafael Catalá Polo (born 21 June 1961) is a Spanish politician and member of the People's Party. He was Minister of Justice and First Notary of the Kingdom from September 2014 to June 2018, and was additionally interim Minister of Public Works between 19 July 2016 and 4 November 2016. Before this, he served as the 4th Secretary of State for Justice between 2002 and 2004 and as the 8th Secretary of State for Infrastructure, Transport and Housing from 2011 to 2014.

On 16 May 2017, the Congress of Deputies passed a motion of censure against Catalá as minister of justice. This was as a result of the maneuvers that have taken place within the fiscal ministry aimed at obstructing certain judicial cases against corruption and of the minister's own actions relating to these cases. He is the first minister of democracy rejected by the full Congress.

Together with the Minister, José Manuel Maza, the Attorney General and Manuel Moix, the Anti-corruption Prosecutor, were rejected.

== Biography ==
Graduated in Law from the Complutense University of Madrid, in 1985 he entered the Higher Body of Civil State Administrators by competitive examination.

During his administrative career, he held the post of Deputy Director General of Organisation and Human Resources Policy in the Ministry of Health and Consumer Affairs (1988–1992). In 1992, he joined AENA, where he was Director of Human Resources Planning and Development, Director of Labour Relations and Director of Administration and Air Navigation Services. He also served until 2011 as general secretary of Codere, a company in the gaming sector.

== Political career ==
After the People's Party's electoral victory in 1996, the Council of Ministers appointed him Director General of the Civil Service in the Ministry of Public Administration, then headed by Mariano Rajoy.

Catalá in October 2001

In January 1999, he was appointed Director General of Personnel and Services at the Ministry of Education and Culture, and between May 2000 and July 2002 he was Under-Secretary at the Ministry of Finance. Between 2002 and 2004 he was Secretary of State for Justice in the Department headed by José María Michavila.

After the 2004 general elections, he was in charge of the management of the Ramón y Cajal Hospital in Madrid. In addition, since 2005 he has been director of the master's degree in Public Administration at Esade and a member of the UNED Social Council.

On 23 December 2011 the Council of Ministers appointed him Secretary of State for Planning and Infrastructure of the Ministry of Public Works, at the proposal of its head, Ana Pastor Julián.

Following Alberto Ruiz-Gallardón's resignation, on 23 September 2014 he was appointed as successor to the Minister of Justice. His appointment was published on 29 September 2014, the day he took office.

On 19 July 2016, he took over the ordinary business of the Ministry of Public Works, whose incumbent until now, Ana Pastor Julián, ceased to hold office after his election as president of the Congress of Deputies.

On 3 November 2016, his continuity as Minister of Justice was confirmed during the second government of Mariano Rajoy, and he was renewed as Minister on 4 November 2016.

On 16 May 2017, he was rejected as Minister of Justice by the Congress of Deputies as a result of the manoeuvres that have taken place within the Public Prosecutor's Office aimed at obstructing certain judicial cases against corruption and the minister's own actions relating to these cases. This makes him the first Minister of Democracy to be rejected by the full Congress. Along with the minister himself, the attorney general José Manuel Maza and the chief anti-corruption prosecutor Manuel Moix were also censured.

On 1 June 2018 he became acting Minister of Justice, pending the appointment of a new Minister, following the motion of censure passed the same day against Mariano Rajoy, with Pedro Sánchez as the new President of the Spanish Government.
