= List of industry ministers of Spain =

This is a list of the officeholders of the Ministry of Industry since 1928, when the government department was established. Throughout history, this position has also had jurisdiction over agriculture, trade and tariffs, tourism, energy and telecommunications, among others. Before 1928, it was the Ministry of Labour the department responsible for industrial affairs, while other departments such as the Office of the Prime Minister and the Ministry of Development had economic and agricultural responsibilities.

Name	Term		Duration	Party	Government		Ref.
The Count of the Andes (1880–1963)	3 November 1928	21 January 1930	1 year, 89 days	Patriotic Union	The Marquess of Estella	Alfonso XIII (1886–1931)	
Sebastián Castedo (1871–1953)	21 January 1930	30 January 1930	9 days	Independent	The Marquess of Estella	Alfonso XIII (1886–1931)	
Manuel Argüelles Argüelles (1875–1945) acting minister	30 January 1930	3 February 1930	4 days	Conservative	The Count of Xauen	Alfonso XIII (1886–1931)	
Julio Wais San Martín (1878–1954)	3 February 1930	20 August 1930	198 days	Conservative	The Count of Xauen	Alfonso XIII (1886–1931)	
Luis Rodríguez de Viguri (1881–1945)	20 August 1930	18 February 1931	182 days	Conservative	The Count of Xauen	Alfonso XIII (1886–1931)	
The Count of Bugallal (1861–1932)	18 February 1931	14 April 1931	55 days	Conservative	Juan Bautista Aznar-Cabañas	Alfonso XIII (1886–1931)	
Lluís Nicolau d'Olwer (1888–1961)	15 April 1931	16 December 1931	245 days	Catalan Action	Niceto Alcalá-Zamora	Niceto Alcalá-Zamora (1931–1936)	
Lluís Nicolau d'Olwer (1888–1961)	15 April 1931	16 December 1931	245 days	Catalan Action	Manuel Azaña	Niceto Alcalá-Zamora (1931–1936)	
Marcelino Domingo (Note: José Salmerón García, Director-General for Forestry, Fishing and Hunting, served as acting minister from May 12 to May 17, 1932 and from July 15 to July 19, 1932. Also, Darío Marcos Cano, Under-Secretary, served as such from May 26 to May 31, 1933.) (1884–1939)	16 December 1931	12 June 1933	1 year, 178 days	Radical Socialist Republican	Manuel Azaña	Niceto Alcalá-Zamora (1931–1936)	
José Franchy y Roca (1871–1944)	12 June 1933	12 September 1933	92 days	Federal Republican	Manuel Azaña	Niceto Alcalá-Zamora (1931–1936)	
Laureano Gómez Paratcha (1884–1968)	12 September 1933	8 October 1933	26 days	Galician Autonomist	Alejandro Lerroux	Niceto Alcalá-Zamora (1931–1936)	
Félix Gordón Ordás (1885–1973)	8 October 1933	16 December 1933	69 days	Radical Socialist Republican	Diego Martínez Barrio	Niceto Alcalá-Zamora (1931–1936)	
Ricardo Samper (1881–1938)	16 December 1933	28 April 1934	133 days	Radical Republican	Alejandro Lerroux	Niceto Alcalá-Zamora (1931–1936)	
Vicente Iranzo (1889–1961)	28 April 1934	4 October 1934	159 days	Independent	Ricardo Samper	Niceto Alcalá-Zamora (1931–1936)	
Andrés Orozco Batista (1888–1961)	4 October 1934	3 April 1935	181 days	Radical Republican	Alejandro Lerroux	Niceto Alcalá-Zamora (1931–1936)	
Manuel Marraco Ramón (1870–1956)	3 April 1935	6 May 1935	33 days	Radical Republican	Alejandro Lerroux	Niceto Alcalá-Zamora (1931–1936)	
Rafael Aizpún (Note: Miguel Gortari Errea, Under-Secretary of Industry and Trade, served as acting minister from July 5 to July 9, 1935 and from July 26 to July 30, 1935.) (1889–1981)	6 May 1935	25 September 1935	142 days	CEDA	Alejandro Lerroux	Niceto Alcalá-Zamora (1931–1936)	
José Martínez de Velasco (1875–1936)	25 September 1935	29 October 1935	34 days	Agrarian	Joaquín Chapaprieta	Niceto Alcalá-Zamora (1931–1936)	
Juan Usabiaga Lasquívar (1879–1953)	29 October 1935	14 December 1935	46 days	Radical Republican	Joaquín Chapaprieta	Niceto Alcalá-Zamora (1931–1936)	
Joaquín de Pablo-Blanco Torres (1896–1947)	14 December 1935	30 December 1935	16 days	Radical Republican	Manuel Portela Valladares	Niceto Alcalá-Zamora (1931–1936)	
José María Álvarez Mendizábal (1891–1965)	30 December 1935	19 February 1936	51 days	Radical Republican	Manuel Portela Valladares	Niceto Alcalá-Zamora (1931–1936)	
Plácido Álvarez-Buylla (Note: Mariano Ruiz-Funes, Minister of Agriculture, served as Acting Minister of Industry and Trade from February 21 to March 21, 1936.) (1885–1938)	19 February 1936	19 July 1936	151 days	Republican Union	Manuel Azaña	Niceto Alcalá-Zamora (1931–1936)	
Plácido Álvarez-Buylla (1885–1938)	19 February 1936	19 July 1936	151 days	Republican Union	Augusto Barcia Trelles (Note: Acting prime minister from 10 to 13 May 1936)	Manuel Azaña (1936–1939)	
Plácido Álvarez-Buylla (1885–1938)	19 February 1936	19 July 1936	151 days	Republican Union	Santiago Casares Quiroga	Manuel Azaña (1936–1939)	
Plácido Álvarez-Buylla (1885–1938)	19 February 1936	19 July 1936	151 days	Republican Union	Diego Martínez Barrio	Manuel Azaña (1936–1939)	
Start of the Spanish Civil War						Manuel Azaña (1936–1939)	
Republican side						Manuel Azaña (1936–1939)	
Plácido Álvarez-Buylla (1885–1938)	19 July 1936	4 September 1936	47 days	Republican Union	José Giral	Manuel Azaña (1936–1939)	
Anastasio de Gracia (1890–1981)	4 September 1936	4 November 1936	61 days	Socialist	Francisco Largo Caballero	Manuel Azaña (1936–1939)	
Joan Peiró (1887–1942)	4 November 1936	17 May 1937	194 days	Independent (CNT)	Francisco Largo Caballero	Manuel Azaña (1936–1939)	
The Ministry of Finance and Economy assumed the responsabilities over industry and trade
Rebel side
The Count of Bau (1897–1973)	4 October 1936	31 January 1938	1 year, 119 days	Independent	Junta Técnica del Estado	Francisco Franco (1939–1975)	
The Marquess of Suanzes (1891–1977)	31 January 1938	1 April 1939	1 year, 60 days	National Movement	Franco I	Francisco Franco (1939–1975)	
End of the Spanish Civil War						Francisco Franco (1939–1975)	
The Marquess of Suanzes (1891–1977)	1 April 1939	9 August 1939	130 days	National Movement	Franco I	Francisco Franco (1939–1975)	
The Marquess of Rende (1891–1971)	9 August 1939	16 October 1940	1 year, 68 days	National Movement	Franco II	Francisco Franco (1939–1975)	
Demetrio Carceller Segura (1894–1971)	16 October 1940	20 July 1945	4 years, 277 days	National Movement	Franco II	Francisco Franco (1939–1975)	
The Marquess of Suanzes (1891–1977)	20 July 1945	19 July 1951	5 years, 364 days	National Movement	Franco III	Francisco Franco (1939–1975)	
Joaquín Planell (1891–1969)	19 July 1951	11 July 1962	10 years, 357 days	National Movement	Franco IV	Francisco Franco (1939–1975)	
Joaquín Planell (1891–1969)	19 July 1951	11 July 1962	10 years, 357 days	National Movement	Franco V	Francisco Franco (1939–1975)	
Gregorio López-Bravo (1923–1985)	10 July 1962	29 October 1969	7 years, 111 days	National Movement	Franco VI	Francisco Franco (1939–1975)	
Gregorio López-Bravo (1923–1985)	10 July 1962	29 October 1969	7 years, 111 days	National Movement	Franco VII	Francisco Franco (1939–1975)	
José María López de Letona (1922–2018)	29 October 1969	3 January 1974	4 years, 66 days	National Movement	Franco VIII	Francisco Franco (1939–1975)	
José María López de Letona (1922–2018)	29 October 1969	3 January 1974	4 years, 66 days	National Movement	Luis Carrero Blanco	Francisco Franco (1939–1975)	
José María López de Letona (1922–2018)	29 October 1969	3 January 1974	4 years, 66 days	National Movement	The Duke of Fernández-Miranda (acting)	Francisco Franco (1939–1975)	
José María López de Letona (1922–2018)	29 October 1969	3 January 1974	4 years, 66 days	National Movement	The Marquess of Arias Navarro	Francisco Franco (1939–1975)	
Alfredo Santos Blanco (1924–2004)	3 January 1974	4 March 1975	1 year, 60 days	National Movement	The Marquess of Arias Navarro	Francisco Franco (1939–1975)	
Alfredo Santos Blanco (1924–2004)	3 January 1974	4 March 1975	1 year, 60 days	National Movement	The Marquess of Arias Navarro	Juan Carlos I (1975–2014)	
Alfonso Álvarez Miranda (1915–2003)	4 March 1975	11 December 1975	282 days	National Movement	The Marquess of Arias Navarro	Juan Carlos I (1975–2014)	
Carlos Pérez de Bricio (1927–2022)	11 December 1975	4 July 1977	1 year, 205 days	National Movement	The Marquess of Arias Navarro	Juan Carlos I (1975–2014)	
Carlos Pérez de Bricio (1927–2022)	11 December 1975	4 July 1977	1 year, 205 days	Spanish Democratic Union	The Marquess of Arias Navarro	Juan Carlos I (1975–2014)	
Carlos Pérez de Bricio (1927–2022)	11 December 1975	4 July 1977	1 year, 205 days	Spanish Democratic Union	The Duke of Suárez	Juan Carlos I (1975–2014)	
Alberto Oliart (1928–2021)	4 July 1977	24 February 1978	235 days	Centrist	The Duke of Suárez	Juan Carlos I (1975–2014)	
Agustín Rodríguez Sahagún (1932–1991)	24 February 1978	5 April 1979	1 year, 40 days	Centrist	The Duke of Suárez	Juan Carlos I (1975–2014)	
Carlos Bustelo (born 1936)	5 April 1979	2 May 1980	1 year, 27 days	Centrist	The Duke of Suárez	Juan Carlos I (1975–2014)	
Ignacio Bayón (1944–2024)	2 May 1980	2 December 1982	2 years, 214 days	Centrist	The Duke of Suárez	Juan Carlos I (1975–2014)	
Ignacio Bayón (1944–2024)	2 May 1980	2 December 1982	2 years, 214 days	Centrist	The Marquess of Ría de Ribadeo	Juan Carlos I (1975–2014)	
Carlos Solchaga (born 1944)	2 December 1982	4 July 1985	2 years, 214 days	Socialist	Felipe González	Juan Carlos I (1975–2014)	
Joan Majó (born 1939)	4 July 1985	25 July 1986	1 year, 21 days	Socialist	Felipe González	Juan Carlos I (1975–2014)	
Luis Carlos Croissier (born 1950)	25 July 1986	11 July 1988	1 year, 352 days	Socialist	Felipe González	Juan Carlos I (1975–2014)	
Claudio Aranzadi (born 1946)	11 July 1988	13 July 1993	5 years, 2 days	Socialist	Felipe González	Juan Carlos I (1975–2014)	
Juan Manuel Eguiagaray (1945–2025)	13 July 1993	5 May 1996	2 years, 297 days	Socialist	Felipe González	Juan Carlos I (1975–2014)	
Josep Piqué (1955–2023)	5 May 1996	28 April 2000	2 years, 258 days	Popular	José María Aznar	Juan Carlos I (1975–2014)	
The ministries of Economy and of Science assumed the responsabilities over industry and energy						Juan Carlos I (1975–2014)	
José Montilla (born 1955)	18 April 2004	8 September 2006	2 years, 143 days	Socialist	José Luis Rodríguez Zapatero	Juan Carlos I (1975–2014)	
Joan Clos (born 1949)	8 September 2006	14 April 2008	1 year, 219 days	Socialist	José Luis Rodríguez Zapatero	Juan Carlos I (1975–2014)	
Miguel Sebastián Gascón (born 1957)	14 April 2008	22 December 2011	3 years, 252 days	Independent	José Luis Rodríguez Zapatero	Juan Carlos I (1975–2014)	
José Manuel Soria (born 1958)	22 December 2011	15 April 2016	4 years, 115 days	Popular	Mariano Rajoy	Juan Carlos I (1975–2014)	
José Manuel Soria (born 1958)	22 December 2011	15 April 2016	4 years, 115 days	Popular	Mariano Rajoy	Felipe VI (2014-present)	
Luis de Guindos (born 1960) acting minister	15 April 2016	4 November 2016	203 days	Independent	Mariano Rajoy	Felipe VI (2014-present)	
The ministries of Economy and of Energy, Tourism and Digital Agenda assumed its responsabilities						Felipe VI (2014-present)	
Reyes Maroto (born 1973)	7 June 2018	28 March 2023	4 years, 294 days	Socialist	Pedro Sánchez	Felipe VI (2014-present)	
Héctor Gómez Hernández (born 1978)	28 March 2023	21 November 2023	238 days	Socialist	Pedro Sánchez	Felipe VI (2014-present)	
Jordi Hereu (born 1965)	21 November 2023	Incumbent	2 years, 357 days	Socialist	Pedro Sánchez	Felipe VI (2014-present)	
