= Secretary of State for Tourism =

Official of the Ministry of Industry and Tourism of Spain

- Secretario de Estado de Turismo
- Coat of Arms used by the Government

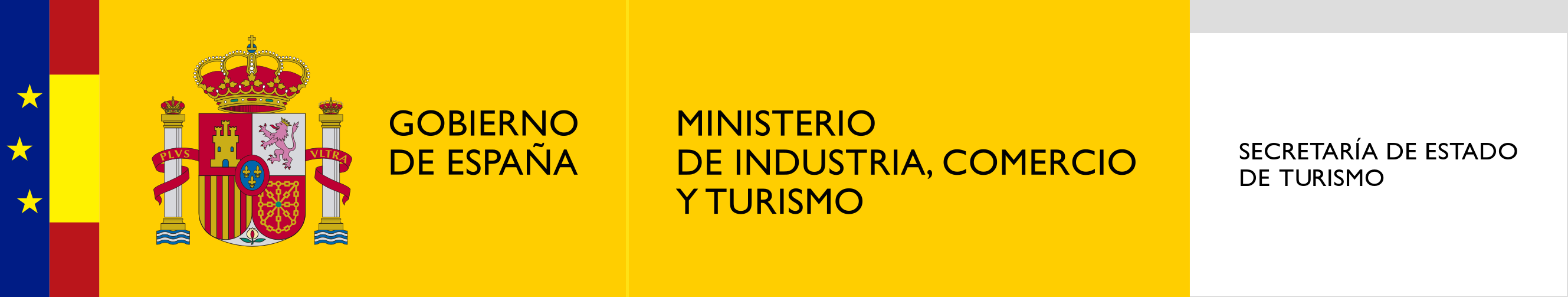

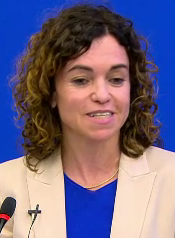
- Incumbent; Rosario Sánchez Grau since 17 April 2024
- Ministry of Industry and Tourism; Secretariat of State for Tourism
- Style: The Most Excellent (formal); Mrs. Secretary of State (informal)
- Abbreviation: SETUR
- Nominator: The Industry Minister
- Appointer: The Monarch
- Precursor: Under Secretary of Tourism
- Formation: July 4, 1977
- First holder: Ignacio Aguirre Borrell
- Website: turismo.gob.es

The secretary of state for tourism is a senior minister of the Spanish Ministry of Industry and Tourism responsible for the government policy on tourism, one of the most developed economic sectors in Spain, representing approximately 12.6% of GDP and 12.3% of total employment in 2024.

The secretary of state also assists the minister in coordinating the tourism policies of the different Spanish administrations—through the Interministerial Committee on Tourism within the General State Administration and through the Sectoral Conference on Tourism for the regions—and with the international relations on this matter, in coordination with the Ministry of Foreign Affairs.

In addition, and through the Tourism Institute of Spain (TURESPAÑA), whose presidency corresponds to the secretary of state, the government exercises the function of external promotion of tourism. The secretary of state also manages the State Financial Fund for Tourism Competitiveness (FOCIT), a fund destined to support the renovation, modernization or transformation plans of developed tourist destinations.

== History ==
The position of Secretary of State for Tourism was created in summer 1977 after a massive State Administration reform. According to the law that created it, the Secretariat of State assumed the competences of the suppressed Undersecretariat of Tourism and all the bodies that integrated it were transferred to the new Secretariat of State. The Undersecretariat of Tourism was created in 1952 and was integrated in the Ministry of Information and Tourism, that was also suppressed in 1977 and replaced by the Ministry of Trade and Tourism.

In 1982, the Secretariat of State is suppressed after a government reform that created a new Ministry called Ministry of Transport, Tourism and Communications and its competences were transferred to a newly body named General Secretariat for Tourism. This General Secretariat survived until 2011 but since 1996 to 2000 was subordinated to the Secretariat of State for Trade, Tourism and SMEs with the First Aznar Government, to the Secretary of State for Trade and Tourism from 2000 to 2004 with the Second Aznar Government, to the Secretary of State for Tourism and Trade from 2004 to 2008 with the First Zapatero Government and from 2008 to 2011 to the Secretary of State for Tourism, after being suppressed by the pro-austerity Government of Mariano Rajoy.

Since 2011 the Secretariat of State has been autonomous and mainly focused in managing the Spanish tourism sector which has become one of the most developed and most important sectors in the economy, representing almost a 12% of GDP and a 13% of the employment by 2018 with more than 82 million tourist each year.

=== Names ===
- Secretary of State for Tourism (1977–1981)
- Secretary of State for Trade, Tourism and SMEs (1996–2000)
- Secretary of State for Trade and Tourism (2000–2004)
- Secretary of State for Tourism and Trade (2004–2008)
- Secretary of State for Tourism (2008–present)

== Structure ==
The Secretariat of State is composed of the following departments:

- The Directorate-General for Tourism Policies.
  It's the department responsible for designing strategies to improve tourist destinations, for developing plans and programs to promote innovation, quality, sustainability and competitiveness of tourism products, for promoting the use of new technologies in tourism and for assisting the secretary of state in the national and international coordination of tourism policies.
  The directorate-general is structured by a Deputy Directorate-General for Tourism Development and Sustainability, a Division for Cooperation and Tourism Competitiveness and a Division for Tourism Programs and Economic Affairs.
- The Cabinet.
  With the administrative rank of deputy directorate-general, the Cabinet provides political, technical, parliamentary, institutional and communication support to the secretary of state.

The secretary of state chairs the Tourism Institute of Spain (TURESPAÑA) and oversees the activity of the State Financial Fund for Tourism Competitiveness (Spanish: Fondo Financiero del Estado para la Competitividad Turística, FOCIT) and of the public enterprises Paradores and State Commercial Company for the Management of Innovation and Tourism Technologies (SEGITTUR).

== List of secretaries of state ==
No.	Image	Name	Term of Office			Prime Minister
No.	Image	Name	Began	Ended	Days of Service	Prime Minister
1º		Ignacio Aguirre Borrell	12 July 1977	28 February 1981	1327	Adolfo Suárez
2º		Eloy Ybáñez Bueno	9 March 1981	8 December 1982	639	Leopoldo Calvo-Sotelo
3º		José Manuel Fernández Norniella	8 May 1996	20 June 1998	773	José María Aznar
4º		Elena Pisonero Ruiz	20 June 1996	6 May 2000	1416	José María Aznar
5º		Juan Costa Climent	6 May 2000	6 September 2003	1218	José María Aznar
6º		Francisco Utrera Mora	6 September 2003	20 April 2004	227	José María Aznar
7º		Pedro Mejía Gómez	24 April 2004	22 April 2008	1459	José Luis Rodríguez Zapatero
8º		Joan Mesquida Ferrando	22 April 2008	27 July 2010	2285	José Luis Rodríguez Zapatero
9º		Isabel María Borrego	31 December 2011	12 November 2016	1778	Mariano Rajoy
10º		Matilde Asian González	22 November 2016	19 June 2018	574	Mariano Rajoy
11º		Isabel Maria Oliver Sagreras	19 June 2018	15 July 2020	757	Pedro Sánchez
12º		Fernando Valdés Verelst	15 July 2020	21 December 2022	889	Pedro Sánchez
13º		Rosa Ana Morillo Rodríguez	21 December 2022	17 April 2024	483	Pedro Sánchez
14º		Rosario Sánchez Grau	17 April 2024	Incumbent	873	Pedro Sánchez
