= José Folgado =

Spanish politician (1944–2020)

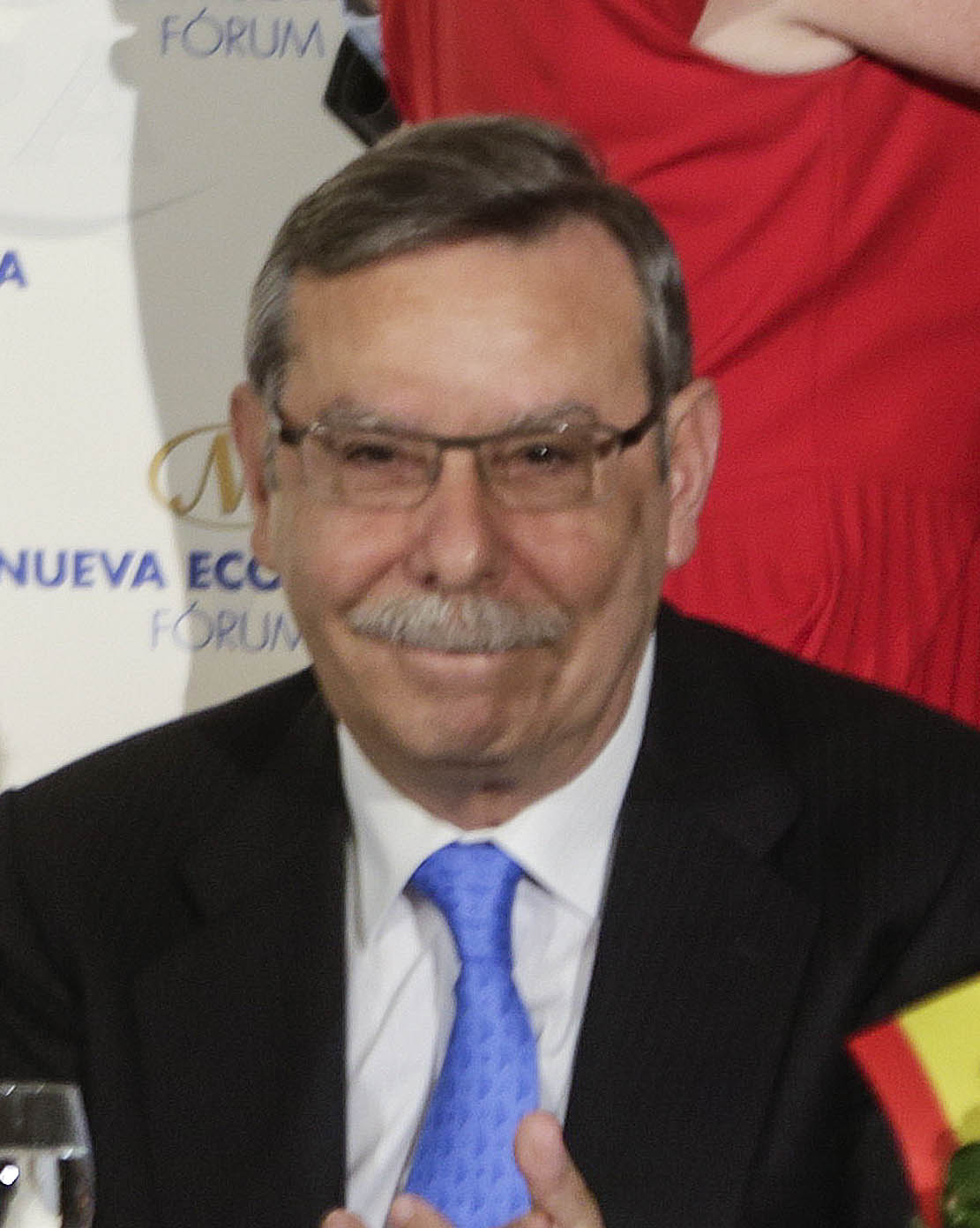

Mayor of Tres Cantos
- In office 2007–2012
- Preceded by: María del Valle de la Poza
- Succeeded by: Jesús Moreno García

Deputy of Congress
- In office 2000–2008
- Constituency: Zamora

Personal details
- Born: 3 April 1944 Morales del Rey, Castile and León, Spain
- Died: 23 March 2020 (aged 75) Madrid, Spain
- Cause of death: COVID-19
- Party: People's Party

José Folgado Blanco (3 April 1944 – 23 March 2020) was a Spanish businessman, economist and politician.

== Biography ==
He was a member of the People's Party. He served as president of Red Eléctrica de España from 2012 to 2018; as Deputy of Congress in 2000 and from 2004 to 2008, representing Zamora; as mayor of Tres Cantos from 2007 to 2012.

Folgado also was Secretary of State for Budget and Expenditure between 1996 and 2000; for Economy, Energy and SMEs between 2000 and 2002; and for Energy, Industrial Development and SMEs since 2002 until 2004.

He died on 23 March 2020 of COVID-19 at the age of 75.

== Honors ==
- Order of Isabella the Catholic (Knight Grand Cross. 2004)
