= Reyes Maroto =

Spanish economist and politician

The Most Excellent Reyes Maroto
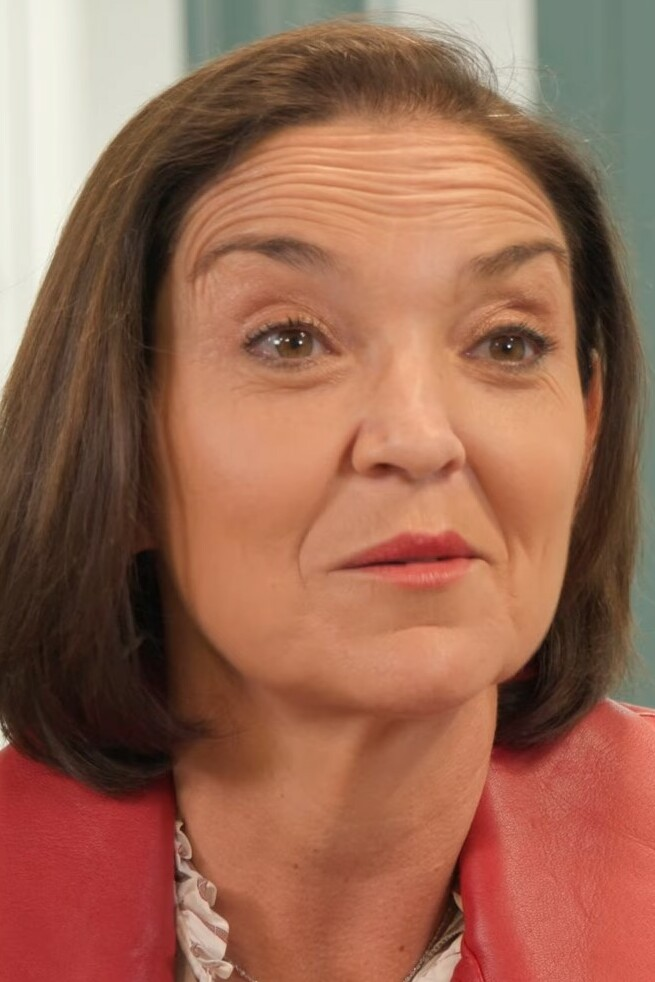

Minister of Industry, Trade and Tourism
- In office 7 June 2018 – 28 March 2023
- Monarch: Felipe VI
- Prime Minister: Pedro Sánchez
- Preceded by: Román Escolano (Economy, Industry and Competitiveness); Álvaro Nadal (Energy, Tourism and Digital Agenda)
- Succeeded by: Héctor Gómez Hernández

Member of the Congress of Deputies
- In office 21 May 2019 – 21 February 2020
- Constituency: Madrid

Member of the Assembly of Madrid
- In office 9 June 2015 – 6 June 2018

Personal details
- Born: María Reyes Maroto Illera; 19 December 1973 (age 52) Medina del Campo, Spain
- Party: Spanish Socialist Worker's Party
- Education: University of Valladolid
- Occupation: Economist, academic and politician

María Reyes Maroto Illera (born 19 December 1973) is a Spanish economist and politician who served as minister of Industry, Trade and Tourism in the government of prime minister Pedro Sánchez from 2018 to 2023.

== Early life and education ==
Although Maroto was born in the town of Medina del Campo (province of Valladolid), her parents are natives and residents of the also Valladolid town of Ataquines, where she spent her childhood and youth. She graduated in Economics from the University of Valladolid.

== Career in academia ==
Maroto worked in the Ideas for Progress Foundation between 2011 and 2013, and has been an associate professor in the Department of Economics at the Charles III University of Madrid.

== Political career ==
=== Regional deputy ===
Candidate number 20 on the list of the Spanish Socialist Worker's Party (PSOE) for the regional elections of May 2015 in the Community of Madrid, Marto was elected and became deputy of the Assembly of Madrid, in which she served as socialist spokeswoman in the Committee of Budgets, Economy, Finance and Employment. She resigned from her parliamentary seat on 6 June 2018.

=== Minister of Industry, Trade and Tourism, 2018–2023 ===
Maroto was appointed by Prime Minister Pedro Sánchez to integrate his new Council of Ministers, following the motion of censure that the PSOE presented against the previous government of Mariano Rajoy (PP) and that was approved by the Congress of Deputies on 1 June 2018. Felipe VI sanctioned her appointment as holder of the portfolio of Industry, Commerce and Tourism by royal decree, becoming the first woman to held the post. On 7 June she took office as Minister before the King at Palace of Zarzuela.

== Controversy ==
On 26 April 2021, Reyes Maroto received an envelope with a bloodstained razor or knife, days after Minister of Interior Fernando Grande-Marlaska, former Second Deputy Prime Minister Pablo Iglesias, and Director of the Guardia Civil María Gámez received envelopes with bullets inside of them.

When the Cumbre Vieja volcano on La Palma began to erupt on 19 September 2021, Reyes Maroto declared that the eruption on La Palma could be used as a tourist attraction to lure visitors. Her comments caused widespread criticism, because the Cumbre Vieja volcano is dotted with numerous homes, public buildings and businesses which began to be destroyed by the lava flows. Later, due to mounting criticism, including from opposition politicians, Reyes Maroto retracted her words.

Political offices
Preceded by Román Escolano; Economy, Industry and Competitiveness; Álvaro Nadal; Energy, Tourism and Digital Agenda	Minister of Industry, Trade and Tourism; 2018–2023	Succeeded by Héctor Gómez Hernández
