= Alberto Nadal =

Spanish politician (born 1970)

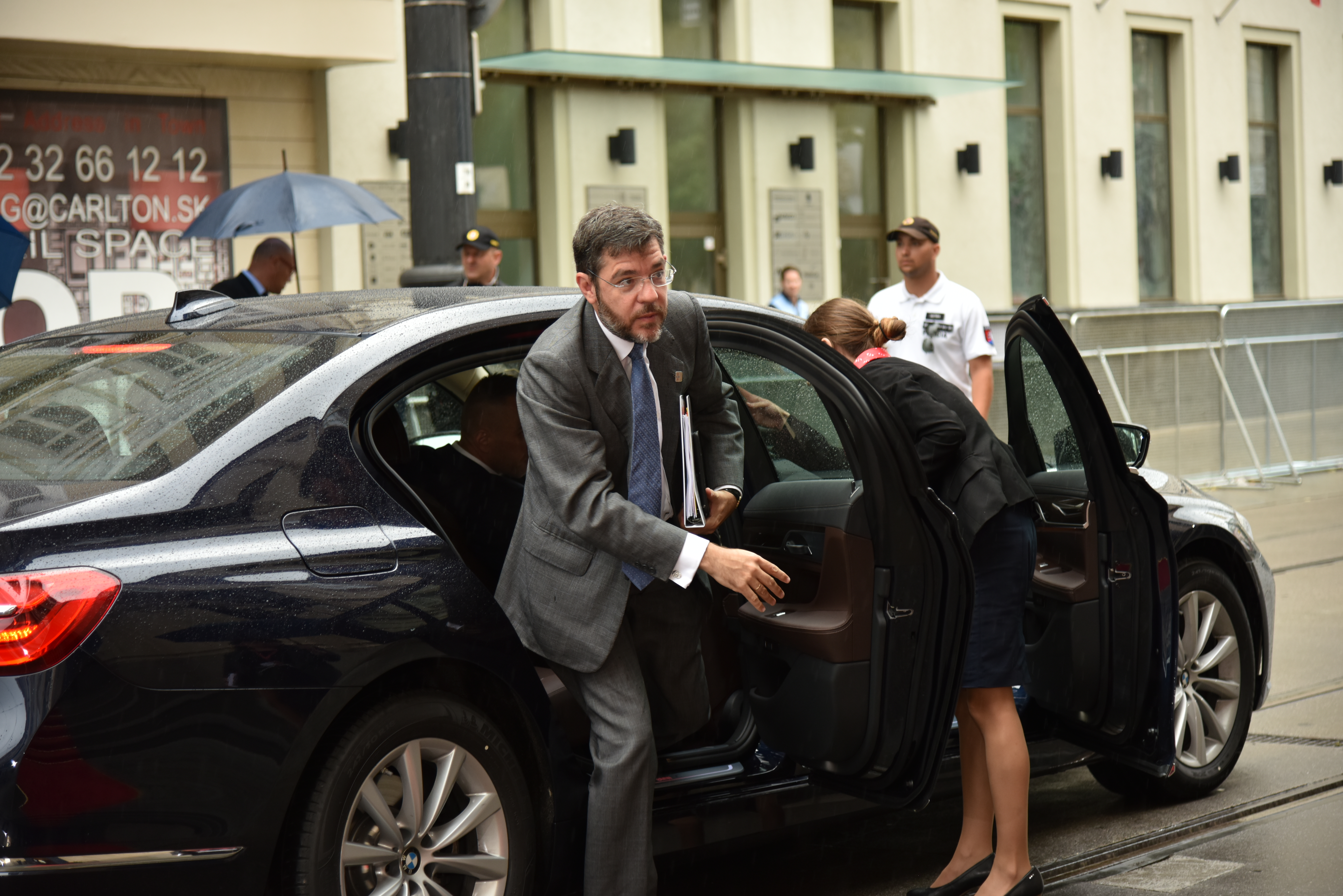
- Nadal in 2016

Secretary of State for Budget and Expenditure
- In office 12 November 2016 – 9 June 2018
- Preceded by: Marta Fernández Currás
- Succeeded by: María José Gualda Romero

Secretary of State for Energy
- In office 29 December 2012 – 12 November 2016
- Preceded by: Fernando Marti Scharfhausen
- Succeeded by: Joan Mesquida

Personal details
- Born: 13 January 1970 (age 56)
- Party: People's Party
- Relatives: Álvaro Nadal (twin brother)

Alberto Nadal Belda (born 13 January 1970) is a Spanish politician. From 2016 to 2018, he served as secretary of state for budget and expenditure. From 2012 to 2016, he served as secretary of state for energy. He is the twin brother of Álvaro Nadal.
