= Isabel Borrego =

Spanish politician (born 1968)

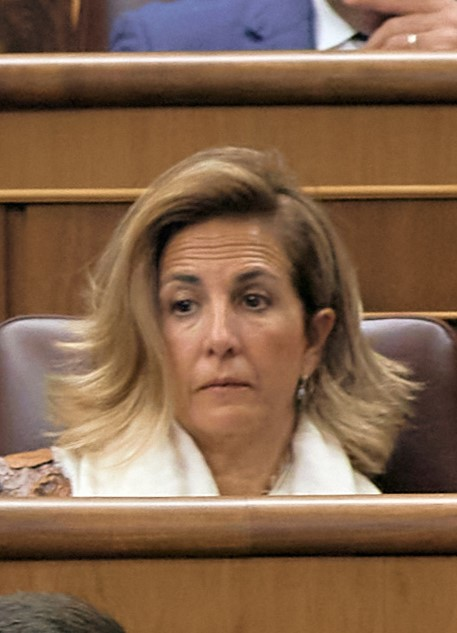
- Borrego in 2024

Member of the Congress of Deputies
- Incumbent
- Assumed office 13 December 2011
- Constituency: Murcia

Secretary of State for Tourism
- In office 30 December 2011 – 11 November 2016
- Preceded by: Joan Mesquida
- Succeeded by: Matilde Asian González

Personal details
- Born: 11 May 1968 (age 57)
- Party: People's Party

Isabel María Borrego Cortés (born 11 May 1968) is a Spanish politician serving as a member of the Congress of Deputies since 2011. From 2011 to 2016, she served as Secretary of State for Tourism.
