= Icex =

ICEX or variant, may refer to:

- ICEX, the Iceland Stock Exchange
- ICEX, the Spanish Institute for Foreign Trade ("Instituto Español de Comercio Exterior")
- ICEX (also spelled ICE X), a US Navy mission in the Arctic Ocean
- Ice X, a form of water ice
