= Manuel Escudero =

Spanish politician (1946–2026)

Ambassador of Spain to the OECD
- In office 5 July 2018 – 21 February 2024
- Preceded by: José Ignacio Wert
- Succeeded by: Ximo Puig

Member of the Congress of Deputies
- In office 17 November 2003 – 20 January 2004
- Constituency: Madrid

Personal details
- Born: 29 March 1946 San Sebastián, Spain
- Died: 23 March 2026 (aged 79)
- Citizenship: Spanish
- Party: Spanish Socialist Workers' Party
- Education: University of Deusto; London School of Economics (MSc & PhD)
- Occupation: Economist, politician, professor

Manuel Escudero Zamora (29 March 1946 – 23 March 2026) was a Spanish economist and politician.

== Life and career ==
Escudero was born in San Sebastián, Gipuzkoa on 29 March 1946. He graduated in business sciences at the Universidad de Deusto and obtained a PhD at the London School of Economics. Between 1987 and 1991, he worked as co-ordinator of the "Programa 2000" of the Spanish Socialist Workers' Party (PSOE). He was professor of macroeconomics at the IE Business School in Madrid between 1991 and 2005 as well as the director of the Global Compact Research Center at the Levin Institute. Linked within the PSOE to Josep Borrell, in 2003, he became a member of the Congress of Deputies representing Madrid, covering the vacant seat left by José Quintana Viar. Escudero, who later took a step back from the political activity, returned to the PSOE and was appointed secretary responsible for the area of economic policy and employment of the PSOE.

Following the accession of Pedro Sánchez to the post of prime minister in June 2018, Escudero was appointed chief ambassador of the Spanish delegation to the Organisation for Economic Co-operation and Development (OECD), replacing José Ignacio Wert.

Escudero died on 23 March 2026, at the age of 79.

Party political offices
Preceded by Manuel de la Rocha Vázquez (Economy)	Secretary of Economy and Employment of the Spanish Socialist Workers' Party; 2016–?	Succeeded by ?
