= Elena Pisonero =

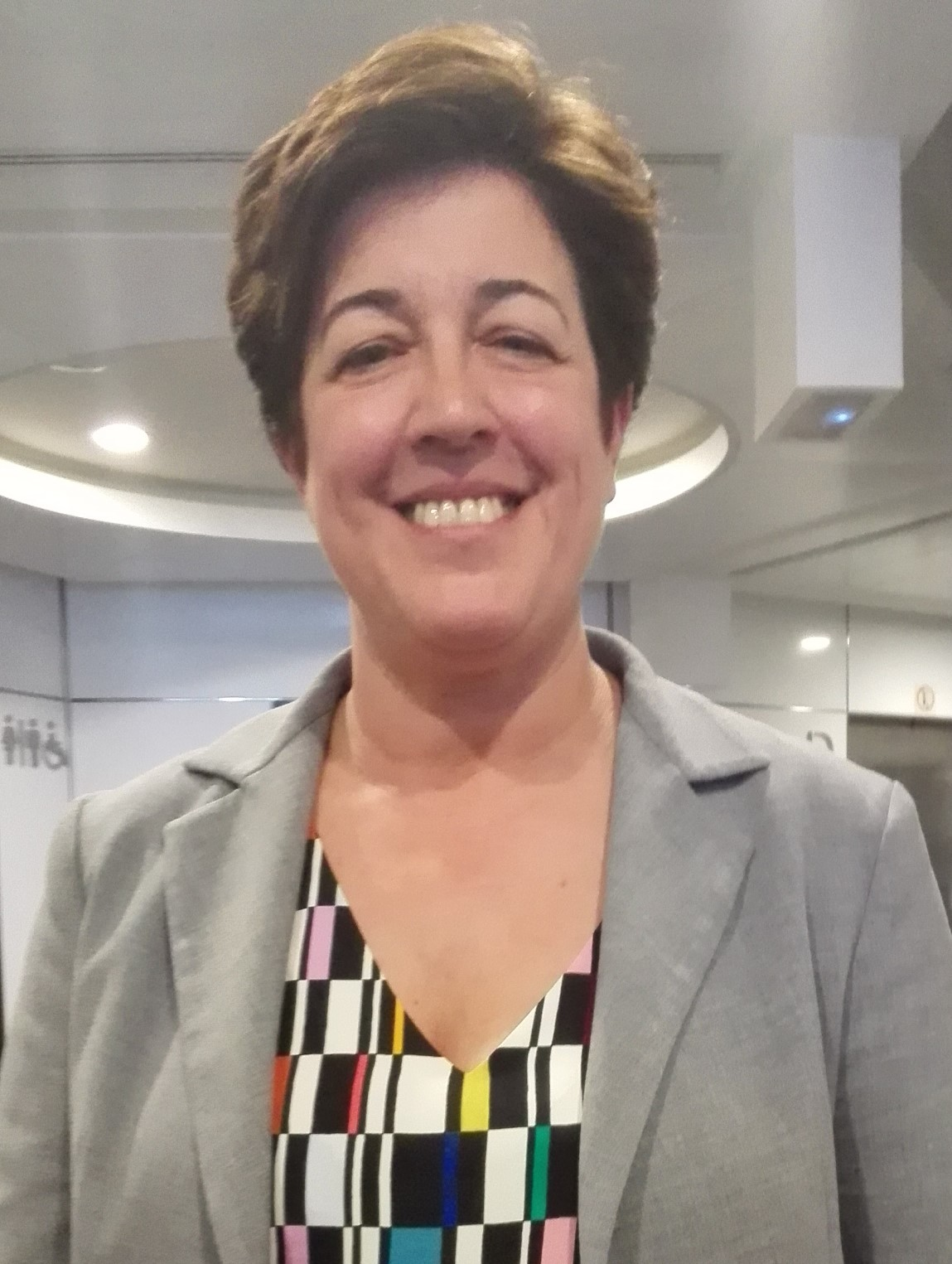
- In 2018

Member of the Congress of Deputies
- In office 5 April 2000 – 26 October 2000
- Constituency: Madrid

Secretary of State for Trade, Tourism, and Small and Medium Enterprises of Spain
- In office 16 July 1998 – 5 May 2000
- Monarch: Juan Carlos I
- President: José María Aznar
- Preceded by: José Manuel Fernández Norniella
- Succeeded by: Juan Costa

Personal details
- Born: María Elena Pisonero Ruiz; 17 January 1963 (age 63) Madrid, Spain
- Party: People's Party
- Education: Autonomous University of Madrid
- Awards: Order of Isabella the Catholic (2000)
- Website: elenapisonero.com

María Elena Pisonero Ruiz (born 17 January 1963) is a Spanish business executive and politician. The founder and president of Taldig Group, she is also a member of Avio's board of directors. Pisonero participates on the advisory council of UNICEF Spain and think tanks such as Elcano Royal Institute.

== Biography ==
Elena Pisonero Ruiz was born in Madrid on 17 January 1963. After earning a licentiate in economics from the Autonomous University of Madrid, she joined Siemens as an analyst, Ernst & Young as a senior consultant, and the Institute of Economic Studies as an economic analyst.

In 1992, she was appointed head of the Economic Advisory Office of the People's Party (PP) Parliamentary Group in the Congress of Deputies. After the PP's victory in the 1996 general election, she went on to serve as advisor and chief of staff to the minister of economy and finance and vice president of the government, Rodrigo Rato.

In June 1998, at Rato's suggestion, Pisonero was appointed Secretary of State for Trade, Tourism and Small and Medium-Sized Enterprises by the Council of Ministers, a position she held until May 2000.

That June, she was made a Dame Grand Cross of the Order of Isabella the Catholic.

In the 2000 general election, Pisonero ran as number six on the PP's list for Madrid, and was elected to the Congress of Deputies. For a few months, she served as the PP's spokesperson on the Committee on Economy and Finance. She resigned as a deputy in October 2000, when she was appointed by the Council of Ministers as Spain's ambassador to the Organisation for Economic Co-operation and Development (OECD), a post she held until 2004.

In May 2004, she was appointed by the Government of the Community of Madrid as a member of its Economic and Social Council. In October 2004, at the 15th National Congress of the PP, she was appointed member of the party's National Executive Committee.

In March 2005, Pisonero began working at KPMG, developing its Infrastructure and Public Administrations area, and later as a partner and advisor to the president until March 2012.

In March 2012, at the proposal of the Spanish government, she was appointed president of the satellite operator Hispasat, a post she held until October 2019.

She was appointed independent director of PRISA in April 2016, serving until November 2017.

Elena Pisonero is the founder and president of Taldig, a company that provides strategic support to leaders and organizations and promotes innovation projects. Since June 2019, she has been a member of the board of directors of Avio, an Italian company in the aerospace sector. She participates on a pro bono basis on the board of UNICEF Spain, with think tanks such as Elcano Royal Institute, and the GATE Center.
