= Alfredo Santos Blanco =

Spanish economist and politician

Minister of Industry of Spain
- In office 4 January 1974 – 5 March 1975
- Prime Minister: Francisco Franco
- Preceded by: José María López de Letona
- Succeeded by: Alfonso Álvarez Miranda

Personal details
- Born: Alfredo Santos Blanco; 26 August 1924 Madrid, Kingdom of Spain
- Died: 10 November 2004 (aged 80) Madrid, Spain
- Party: Nonpartisan (National Movement)

Alfredo Santos Blanco (26 August 1924 – 10 November 2004) was a Spanish politician who served as Minister of Industry of Spain between 1974 and 1975, during the Francoist dictatorship.
