= Alfonso Álvarez Miranda =

Spanish economist and politician (1915–2003)

Minister of Industry of Spain
- In office 5 March 1975 – 12 December 1975
- Prime Minister: Carlos Arias Navarro
- Preceded by: Alfredo Santos Blanco
- Succeeded by: Carlos Pérez de Bricio

Personal details
- Born: Alfonso Álvarez Miranda; 2 July 1915 Havana, Cuba
- Died: 30 November 2003 (aged 88) Madrid, Spain
- Party: Nonpartisan (National Movement)

Alfonso Álvarez Miranda (2 July 1915 – 30 November 2003) was a Spanish politician who served as Minister of Industry of Spain in 1975, during the Francoist dictatorship.
