= Turespaña =

Spanish government tourism agency

Tourism Institute of Spain
- Instituto de Turismo de España – Turespaña
- Turespaña logo by Joan Miró

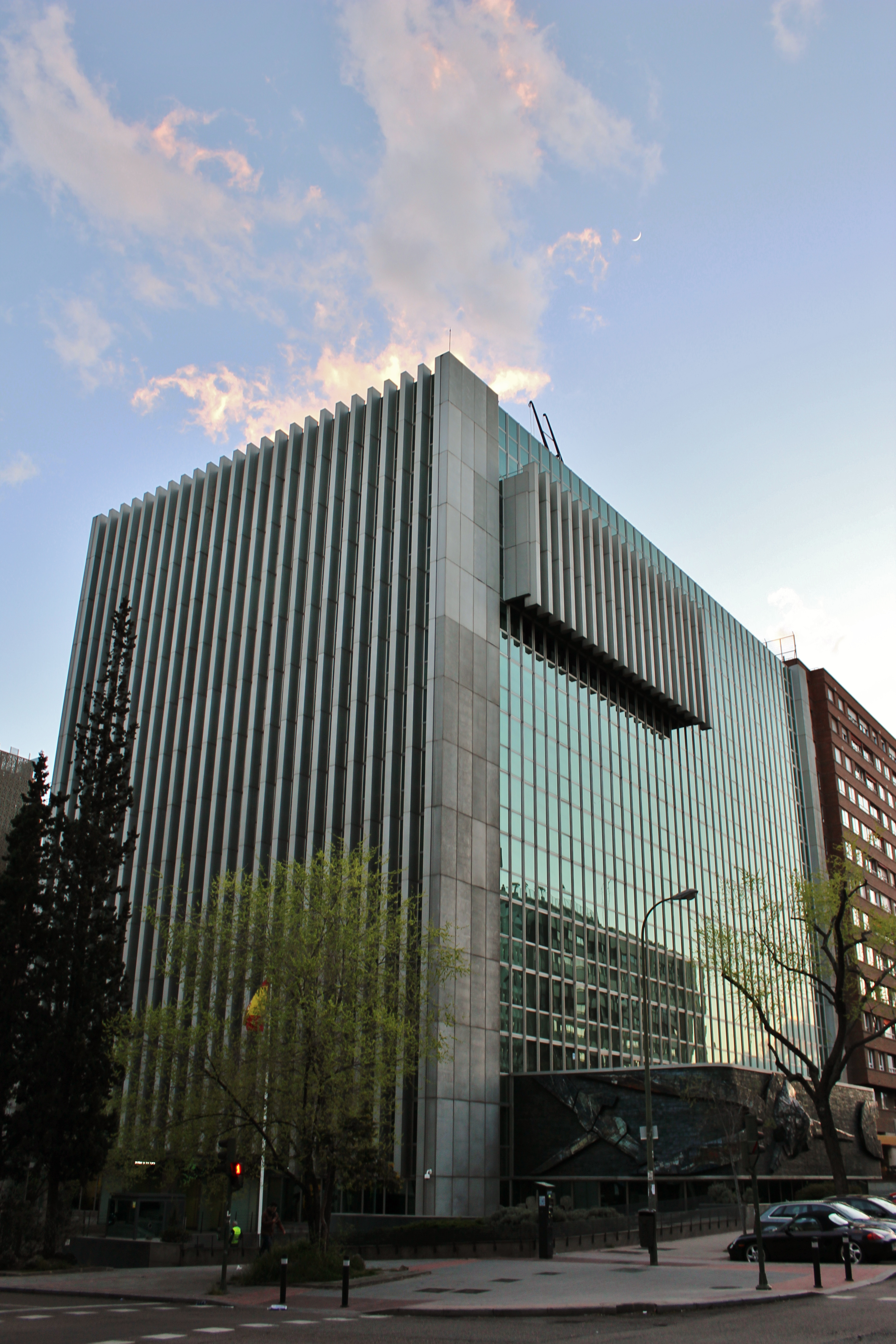
- Headquarters building.

Agency overview
- Formed: 24 July 1985
- Preceding agency: Instituto Español de Turismo y Exposiciones, Congresos y Convenciones de España
- Jurisdiction: Government of Spain
- Headquarters: Madrid, Spain
- Parent department: Secretary of State for Tourism
- Website: Turespaña website

The Instituto de Turismo de España – Turespaña (Tourism Institute of Spain) is the official agency of the Government of Spain responsible for the marketing of the country as a tourist destination throughout the world. It depends on the Ministry of Industry, Trade and Tourism through the Secretary of State for Tourism.

== History ==
The Instituto Nacional de Promoción del Turismo (INPROTUR) was created by the 1985 General State Budget Law 50/1984, of 30 December assuming the functions of promoting Spanish tourism, as well as those of the Instituto Español de Turismo y Exposiciones, Congresos y Convenciones de España. The new agency was established on 24 July 1985 under the Ministry of Transport, Tourism and Communications. In 1988 the agency changed its name to Instituto de Promoción del Turismo de España (TURESPAÑA) and in 1990 it took its current name Instituto de Turismo de España (TURESPAÑA).

== Functions ==
- Planning, development and execution of actions for the promotion of Spain as a tourist destination in international markets.
- Support for the marketing of Spanish tourism products abroad. To this end, it collaborates with autonomous communities, local entities and the private sector.
- Establishment of the strategy and planning of the action of Paradores de Turismo de España and investment in new Paradors.

== Logo ==
In 1983, the Secretary of State for Tourism commissioned painter Joan Miró the creation of a logo for the corporate identity of Spanish tourism. Since Miró was no longer in good health, they agreed to use elements from previous works rather than create a new one from scratch. He used the lettering of the official poster he painted for the 1982 FIFA World Cup and the sun and star of a poster he painted in 1968 for Fondation Maeght to create the logo known as The Sun of Miró. Miró refused to be paid for this commission and renounced the logo's royalties. He died at the end of 1983 without seeing his work in use, as it was first used in the 1984 campaign "Spain. Everything under the sun". This was the first time that a national tourism authority developed a tourism marketing plan and a corporate identity. The logo, still in use, was Miró's last and best-known work, with a recognition rate that in Europe approached 90% of the population at times.
