= José María López de Letona =

Spanish politician (1922–2018)

Minister of Industry of Spain
- In office 30 October 1969 – 4 January 1974
- Prime Minister: Francisco Franco; Luis Carrero Blanco
- Preceded by: Faustino García-Moncó
- Succeeded by: Alfredo Santos Blanco

Personal details
- Born: José María López de Letona Núñez del Pino; 26 November 1922 Burgos, Kingdom of Spain
- Died: 3 July 2018 (aged 95) Madrid, Spain
- Party: Nonpartisan (National Movement)

José María López de Letona Núñez del Pino (26 November 1922 – 3 July 2018) was a Spanish politician who served as Minister of Industry of Spain between 1969 and 1974, during the Francoist dictatorship.
