= Secretary of State for Budget and Expenditure =

Spanish government minister

- Secretario de Estado de Presupuestos y Gastos
- Coat of Arms used by the Government

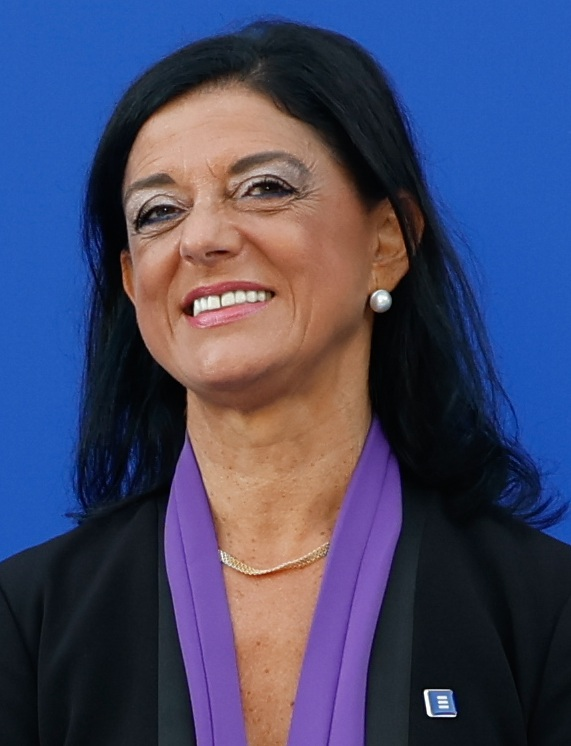
- Incumbent; María José Gualda Romero since 9 June 2018
- Ministry of Finance; Secretariat of State for Budget and Expenditure
- Style: The Most Excellent (formal); Mr./Ms. Secretary of State (informal)
- Abbreviation: SEPG
- Member of: Government Delegated Committee for Economic Affairs
- Nominator: The Finance Minister
- Appointer: The Monarch
- Formation: 22 June 1973; 53 years ago
- First holder: Francisco Fernández Ordóñez
- Website: sepg.pap.hacienda.gob.es

The secretary of state for budget and expenditure is a senior minister of the Spanish Ministry of Finance responsible for coordinating actions related to planning, programming and budgeting of the State public sector and its personnel costs.

In this sense, the secretary of state establishes the budgetary stability targets and the non-financial spending limit, monitors compliance with targets for budgetary stability, public debt, and the spending rule across the public sector, and proposes corrective measures to address any deviations.

== History ==
The position of Secretary of State for Budget and Expenditure was established in June 1973 "with the special mission of ensuring the coordination of the functions pertaining to the Department [of Finance]" in the monetary, credit, budgetary and public spending areas. In this regard, Decree 1312/1973, of June 22, established that this office—then called Under-Secretary for Financial Economics—was needed due to the "significant transformation undergone by our financial institutions, the complexity of monetary and credit instruments [...], as well as the greater demands imposed by new budgetary techniques and the need for agility and flexibility in public spending".

The under-secretary had under its authority the Directorate-General for the Treasury, the Directorate-General for State Assets, the Directorate-General for Financial Policy, the Directorate-General for Budget, the Directorate-General for Insurance and the Official Credit Institute.

During the Spanish transition to democracy, part of its financial responsibilities were transferred to the newly created Ministry of Economy and it was renamed as "Under-Secretary for Budget and Public Expenditure".

In the early 1980s, it was renamed as "Secretary-General for Budget and Public Expenditure" and was placed under the authority of the Secretary of State for Finance. It did not last long, as it was abolished in February 1984 and its powers were assumed directly by the secretary of state, Josep Borrell, former Secretary-General for Budget and Public Expenditure.

The idea behind this reform was to centralize decision-making regarding revenue and expenditure in a single place—the secretary of state. Its ineffectiveness quickly became apparent, as an intermediate position responsible for budgeting and public accounting was re-established in November 1986, the Secretary-General for Planning and Budget.

A decade later, in May 1996, the office was elevated to the rank of secretary of state and named "Secretary of State for Budget and Expenditure". As explained by the first budget secretary José Folgado at the Congress of Deputies Budget Committee:

"the new Secretariat of State for Budget and Expenditure assumes administrative units previously held primarily by the Secretariat of State for Finance, the General Secretariat for Planning and Budget, and also by the Secretariat of State for Economy, specifically the now-defunct Directorate-General for Regional Economic Incentives. The reorganization and consolidation of all units related to budget planning and the monitoring and control of expenditures by State Administration bodies aims to lay the groundwork for a more efficient use of public resources, a pressing need for Spanish society"

— FOLGADO, J., Congress of Deputies Journal, Thursday, June 18, 1996.

In 2004, prime minister José Luis Rodríguez Zapatero returned budgetary responsibilities to the Secretariat of State for Finance; the position was once again downgraded to an undersecretariat and renamed as "Secretary-General for Budget and Expenditure". In December 2011, prime minister Mariano Rajoy returned to the 1996–2004 structure that today exists.

For most of its history, the Secretariat of State had managed the European Union's funds and budgetary relations, however, in December 2023 finance minister María Jesús Montero assumed this powers directly through a General Secretariat for European Funds. In exchange, the secretary of state was given back authority over the Office of the Comptroller General, which since 2018 had been the responsibility of the Ministry's Under-Secretary.

== Organization ==
The secretary of state is the head of the Secretariat of State and, by the minister's delegation, is the ultimate authority responsible for budgetary affairs and expenditure. The secretary of state is assisted by two directors-general and supervises the Comptroller General of the State, with the rank of under-secretary.

Secretariat of State Organization (2026)
| Secretary of State | Cabinet (Chief of Staff) |
| Secretary of State | Deputy Directorate-General for Economic Analysis and Programming |
| Directorate-General for Budget | Deputy Directorate-General for Budget |
| Directorate-General for Budget | Deputy Directorate-General for Budgetary Policy |
| Directorate-General for Budget | Deputy Directorate-General for Budgetary Programs in General Activities |
| Directorate-General for Budget | Deputy Directorate-General for Budgetary Programs in Economic Activities |
| Directorate-General for Budget | Deputy Directorate-General for Budgetary Programs in Social Security and Protection |
| Directorate-General for Budget | Deputy Directorate-General for Budgetary Programs in Education, Culture and Other Public Policies |
| Directorate-General for Budget | Deputy Directorate-General for Financial Programming of the Public Enterprise Sector |
| Directorate-General for Budget | Deputy Directorate-General for Cross-Cutting Budget Analysis and Resource Management |
| Directorate-General for Personnel Costs | Deputy Directorate-General for Regulatory Oversight and Administrative Appeals |
| Directorate-General for Personnel Costs | Deputy Directorate-General for Studies and Analysis |
| Directorate-General for Personnel Costs | Deputy Directorate-General for Cost Management |
| Comptroller General of the State | Technical Cabinet |
| Comptroller General of the State | National Audit Office |
| Comptroller General of the State | National Accounting Office |
| Comptroller General of the State | Deputy Directorate-General for Comptrollership and Auditing |
| Comptroller General of the State | Deputy Directorate-General for Studies and Coordination |
| Comptroller General of the State | Deputy Directorate-General for Resources Organization, Planning and Management |
| Comptroller General of the State | Budgetary Informatics Office |
| Comptroller General of the State | National Anti-Fraud Coordination Service |

== List of officeholders ==
For the purpose of this list, the date used is the date on which the decree of appointment or dismissal received royal assent, which may differ from the date of publication or of the effective taking of office.

| Officeholder | Term | | | Government | | Ref. |
| Officeholder | Start | End | Duration | Government | | Ref. |
|---|---|---|---|---|---|---|
| Francisco Fernández Ordóñez (1930–1992) | 28 June 1973 | 1 February 1974 | 218 days | Luis Carrero Blanco (1973) | Francisco Franco (1939–1975) | |
| Francisco Fernández Ordóñez (1930–1992) | 28 June 1973 | 1 February 1974 | 218 days | The Marquess of Arias Navarro (1976–1981) | Francisco Franco (1939–1975) | |
| The Count of Bugallal (1917–2007) | 8 February 1974 | 8 November 1974 | 273 days | The Marquess of Arias Navarro (1976–1981) | Francisco Franco (1939–1975) | |
| José Luis Cerón Ayuso (1924–2009) | 8 November 1974 | 7 March 1975 | 119 days | The Marquess of Arias Navarro (1976–1981) | Francisco Franco (1939–1975) | |
| José Ramón Álvarez Rendueles (born 1940) | 21 March 1975 | 9 April 1976 | 1 year, 19 days | The Marquess of Arias Navarro (1976–1981) | Francisco Franco (1939–1975) | |
| José Ramón Álvarez Rendueles (born 1940) | 21 March 1975 | 9 April 1976 | 1 year, 19 days | The Marquess of Arias Navarro (1976–1981) | Juan Carlos I (1975–2014) | |
| Prudencio de Luis Díaz de Monasterio-Guren (1926–2016) | 9 April 1976 | 10 September 1976 | 154 days | The Marquess of Arias Navarro (1976–1981) | Juan Carlos I (1975–2014) | |
| Prudencio de Luis Díaz de Monasterio-Guren (1926–2016) | 9 April 1976 | 10 September 1976 | 154 days | The Duke of Suárez (1976–1981) | Juan Carlos I (1975–2014) | |
| Jaime Basanta de la Peña (born 1934) | 10 September 1976 | 11 July 1977 | 304 days | The Duke of Suárez (1976–1981) | Juan Carlos I (1975–2014) | |
| José Barea Tejeiro (1923–2014) | 11 July 1977 | 27 April 1979 | 1 year, 290 days | The Duke of Suárez (1976–1981) | Juan Carlos I (1975–2014) | |
| Miguel Martín Fernández (born 1943) | 27 April 1979 | 4 December 1981 | 2 years, 221 days | The Duke of Suárez (1976–1981) | Juan Carlos I (1975–2014) | |
| Miguel Martín Fernández (born 1943) | 27 April 1979 | 4 December 1981 | 2 years, 221 days | The Marquess of Ría de Ribadeo (1981–1982) | Juan Carlos I (1975–2014) | |
| José Miguel Bravo de Laguna (born 1944) | 4 December 1981 | 3 September 1982 | 273 days | The Marquess of Ría de Ribadeo (1981–1982) | Juan Carlos I (1975–2014) | |
| Josep Borrell (born 1947) | 7 December 1982 | 1 February 1984 | 1 year, 56 days | Felipe González (1982–1996) | Juan Carlos I (1975–2014) | |
| Position abolished during this interval. | | | | Felipe González (1982–1996) | Juan Carlos I (1975–2014) | |
| Rafael de la Cruz Corcoll (1945–2012) | 28 November 1986 | 22 April 1988 | 1 year, 146 days | Felipe González (1982–1996) | Juan Carlos I (1975–2014) | |
| Antonio Zabalza Martí (1945–2012) | 22 April 1988 | 15 March 1991 | 2 years, 327 days | Felipe González (1982–1996) | Juan Carlos I (1975–2014) | |
| Julio Viñuela Díaz (born 1941) | 12 April 1991 | 15 July 1994 | 3 years, 94 days | Felipe González (1982–1996) | Juan Carlos I (1975–2014) | |
| Federico Montero Hita (born 1946) | 15 July 1994 | 7 May 1996 | 1 year, 297 days | Felipe González (1982–1996) | Juan Carlos I (1975–2014) | |
| José Folgado (1944–2020) | 7 May 1996 | 28 April 2000 | 3 years, 357 days | José María Aznar (1996–2004) | Juan Carlos I (1975–2014) | |
| Elvira Rodríguez (born 1949) | 5 May 2000 | 7 March 2003 | 2 years, 306 days | José María Aznar (1996–2004) | Juan Carlos I (1975–2014) | |
| Ricardo Lorenzo Martínez Rico (born 1964) | 7 March 2003 | 19 April 2004 | 1 year, 43 days | José María Aznar (1996–2004) | Juan Carlos I (1975–2014) | |
| Carlos Ocaña (born 1959) | 19 April 2004 | 10 March 2006 | 1 year, 325 days | José Luis Rodríguez Zapatero (2004–2011) | Juan Carlos I (1975–2014) | |
| Luis Espadas Moncalvillo (born 1949) | 24 March 2006 | 30 December 2011 | 5 years, 281 days | José Luis Rodríguez Zapatero (2004–2011) | Juan Carlos I (1975–2014) | |
| Marta Fernández Currás (born 1963) | 30 December 2011 | 11 November 2016 | 4 years, 317 days | Mariano Rajoy (2011–2018) | Juan Carlos I (1975–2014) | |
| Marta Fernández Currás (born 1963) | 30 December 2011 | 11 November 2016 | 4 years, 317 days | Mariano Rajoy (2011–2018) | Felipe VI (2014–present) | |
| Alberto Nadal (born 1970) | 11 November 2016 | 8 June 2018 | 1 year, 209 days | Mariano Rajoy (2011–2018) | Felipe VI (2014–present) | |
| María José Gualda Romero (born 1965) | 8 June 2018 | Incumbent | 8 years, 124 days | Pedro Sánchez (2018–) | Felipe VI (2014–present) | |

== See also ==
- General State Budget
- Balanced budget amendment
