= Álvaro Nadal =

Spanish economist and politician

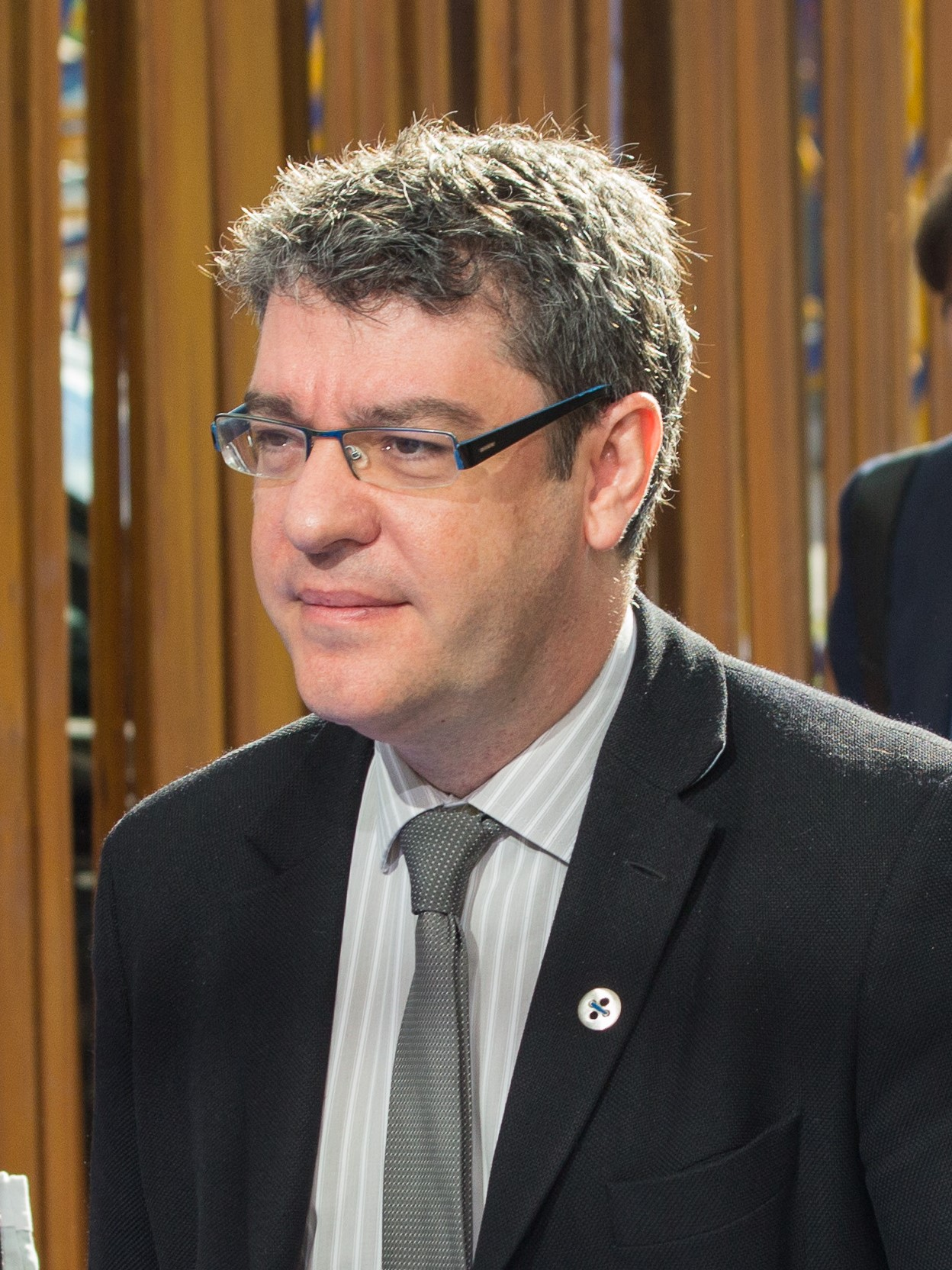

Minister of Energy, Tourism and Digital Agenda
- In office 4 November 2016 – 7 June 2018
- Prime Minister: Mariano Rajoy
- Preceded by: José Manuel Soria
- Succeeded by: Teresa Ribera; Ecological Transition; Reyes Maroto Tourism

Director-General of the Economic Office of the Prime Minister of Spain
- In office 23 December 2011 – 4 November 2016
- Prime Minister: Mariano Rajoy
- Preceded by: Javier Vallés Liberal
- Succeeded by: Eva Valle Maestro

Member of the Congress of Deputies
- Incumbent
- Assumed office 25 March 2008
- Constituency: Madrid

Personal details
- Born: 30 January 1970 (age 56) Madrid, Spain
- Party: People's Party
- Relatives: Alberto Nadal (twin brother)
- Education: Universidad Pontificia Comillas; ICAI School of Engineering; ICADE

Álvaro María Nadal Belda is a Spanish economist and politician. He has been a member of the Congress of Deputies since 2008. He was appointed Minister of Energy, Tourism and Digital Agenda on 4 November 2016. He left office on 7 June 2018 after the Government that he was part of lost the support of the Congress.

He has a twin brother named Alberto Nadal who was Secretary of State of Budgets and Expenditures since 2016 to 2018.

== Biography ==
Álvaro María Nadal Belda born in Madrid on 30 January 1970. He holds a degree in law, Economics and Business. He is a Commercial Technician and State Economist and he passed a Doctorate courses at Harvard University. He also held different administrative positions in the ministries of Economy, the Treasury and Industry.

Since 2004 is Secretary of Economy of the Popular Party and since 2011, Director-General of the Economic Office of the President of the Government. In 2008 he was elected Deputy of the Congress of Deputies.

In 2016, PM Mariano Rajoy appointed him as his new Minister of Energy, Tourism and Digital Agenda until 2018.

He speaks fluently English, French and German.

Coincidentally, he has the same degrees as his twin brother.
