= List of ambassadors of Spain to the Organisation for Economic Co-operation and Development =

Senior diplomat

Ambassador Permanent Delegate of Spain to the OECD
- Coat of arms of Spain

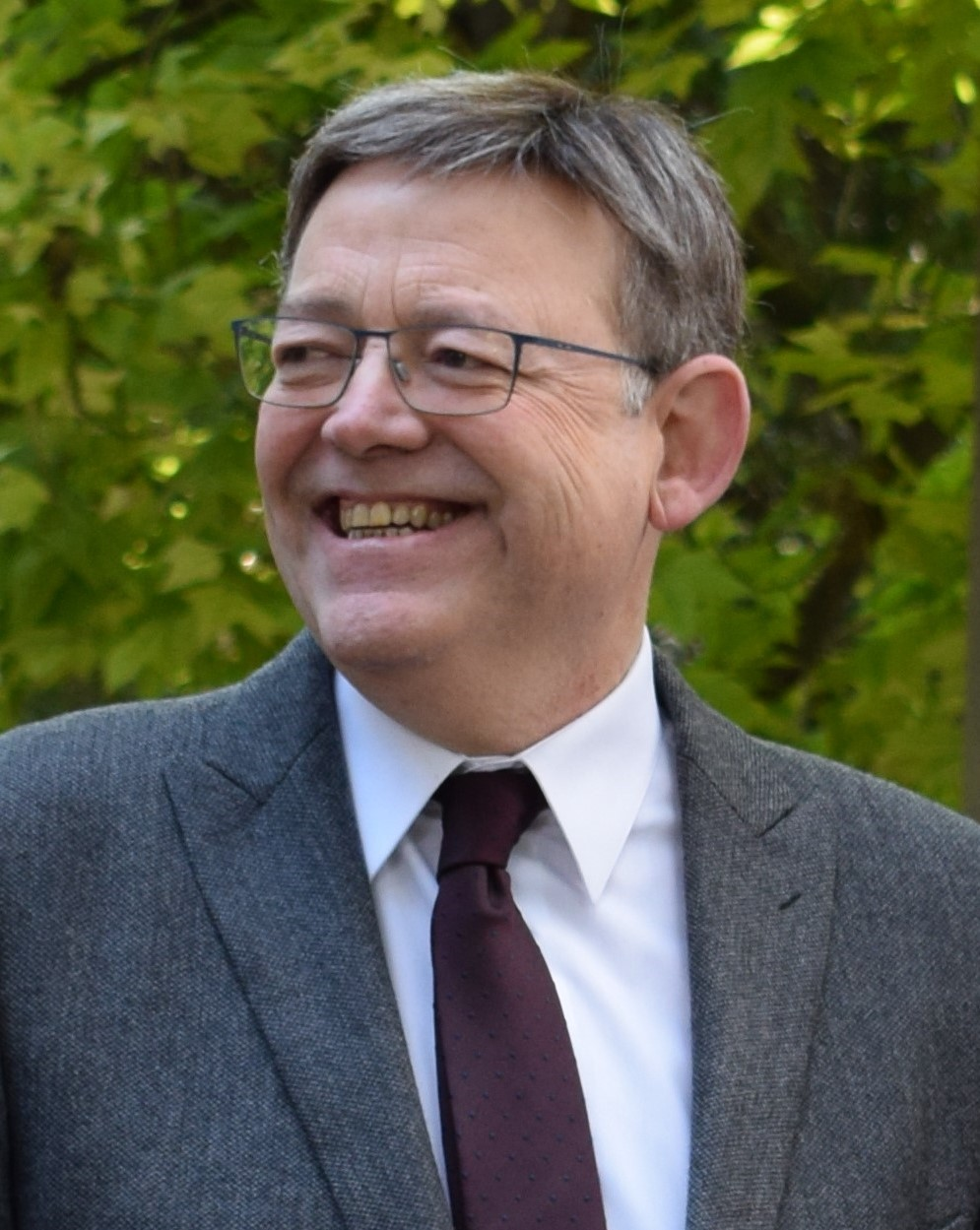
- Incumbent; Ximo Puig since 21 February 2024
- Ministry of Foreign Affairs; Directorate-General for Economic Diplomacy
- Style: The Most Excellent
- Residence: Paris
- Nominator: The Foreign Minister
- Appointer: The Monarch
- Inaugural holder: Pedro Argüelles Armada
- Formation: 1955
- Deputy: Deputy Permanent Delegate
- Website: Spanish Mission to OECD

The permanent delegate of Spain to the OECD, officially called ambassador head of the Permanent Delegation of Spain to the Organisation for Economic Co-operation and Development, is the official representative of the Kingdom of Spain to the OECD.

Spain, under the dictatorship of Francisco Franco, participated in some meetings of the today defunct European Organization for Agricultural Cooperation (1948–1955). Due to the merger of this organization with the Organisation for European Economic Co-operation (OEEC), Spain participated in the merger meetings and was allowed to participate since January 1955 in those OEEC bodies regarding agriculture and food. In January 1956, an examination process was initiated to determine Spain economic status and how to increase its participation in the organization. It was decided to give Spain the status of associated member —like Canada, Japan and the United States–, which was completed in early 1958. Spain became a full member on 20 July 1959 and, later, it was one of the founding members of the current OECD.

== Permanent Delegation ==
Unlike other ambassadors, the OECD ambassador represents Spanish economic interests, and these are exclusive responsibility of the foreign minister, through the Directorate-General for Economic Diplomacy, which designs, coordinates and implements Spanish multilateral economic relations, including the OECD.

As of 2025, the Permanent Delegation is composed by:

- The Head of the Permanent Delegation (or Permanent Delegate), with rank of Ambassador Extraordinary and Plenipotentiary. The permanent delegate personally represents Spain before the OECD Council and coordinates the rest of the delegation.
- The Deputy Head of the Permanent Delegation, who replaces the head of mission when necessary and represents Spain before the executive committee and the External Relations Committee.
- The Counsellors, who head specialized offices and assist the representatives in their area of competence. There are currently ten offices: 1. Development Cooperation, 2. Education, 3. Labor and Social Security, 4. Trade, 5. Tourism, 6. Agriculture, Fisheries and Food, 7. Ecological Transition, 8. Economic, 9. Information and 10. Finance.

The Permanent Delegation also has a Chancellery and administrative support staff.

== List of ambassadors ==
Name	Rank	Term
Pedro Argüelles Armada	Head of Delegation	1955–1958
José Núñez Iglesias	Head of Delegation	1958–1964
José Aragonés Vila	Head of Delegation	1965–1970
Francisco Javier Elorza y Echániz; 3rd Marqués de Nerva	Ambassador; Head of Delegation	1970–1973
Francisco Javier Vallaure Fernández-Peña	Ambassador; Head of Delegation	1973–1978
Tomás Chávarri y del Rivero	Ambassador; Head of Delegation	1978–1983
José Vicente Torrente Secorun	Ambassador; Head of Delegation	1983–1986
José Antonio López Zatón	Ambassador; Head of Delegation	1987–1990
Eloy Ybáñez Bueno	Ambassador; Head of Delegation	1990–1993
Claudio Aranzadi	Ambassador; Head of Delegation	1993–1996
José Luis Feito Higueruela	Ambassador; Head of Delegation	1996–2000
Elena Pisonero Ruiz	Ambassador; Head of Delegation	2000–2004
Fernando Ballestero Díaz	Ambassador; Head of Delegation	2004–2008
Cristina Narbona	Ambassador; Head of Delegation	2008–2011
Ricardo Díez-Hochleitner Rodríguez	Ambassador; Head of Delegation	2011–2015
José Ignacio Wert	Ambassador; Head of Delegation	2015–2018
Manuel Escudero	Ambassador; Head of Delegation	2018–2024
Ximo Puig	Ambassador; Head of Delegation	2024–pres.
