= Ministry of Energy, Tourism and Digital Agenda =

Government of Spain

- Ministerio de Energía, Turismo y Agenda Digital
- Logotype

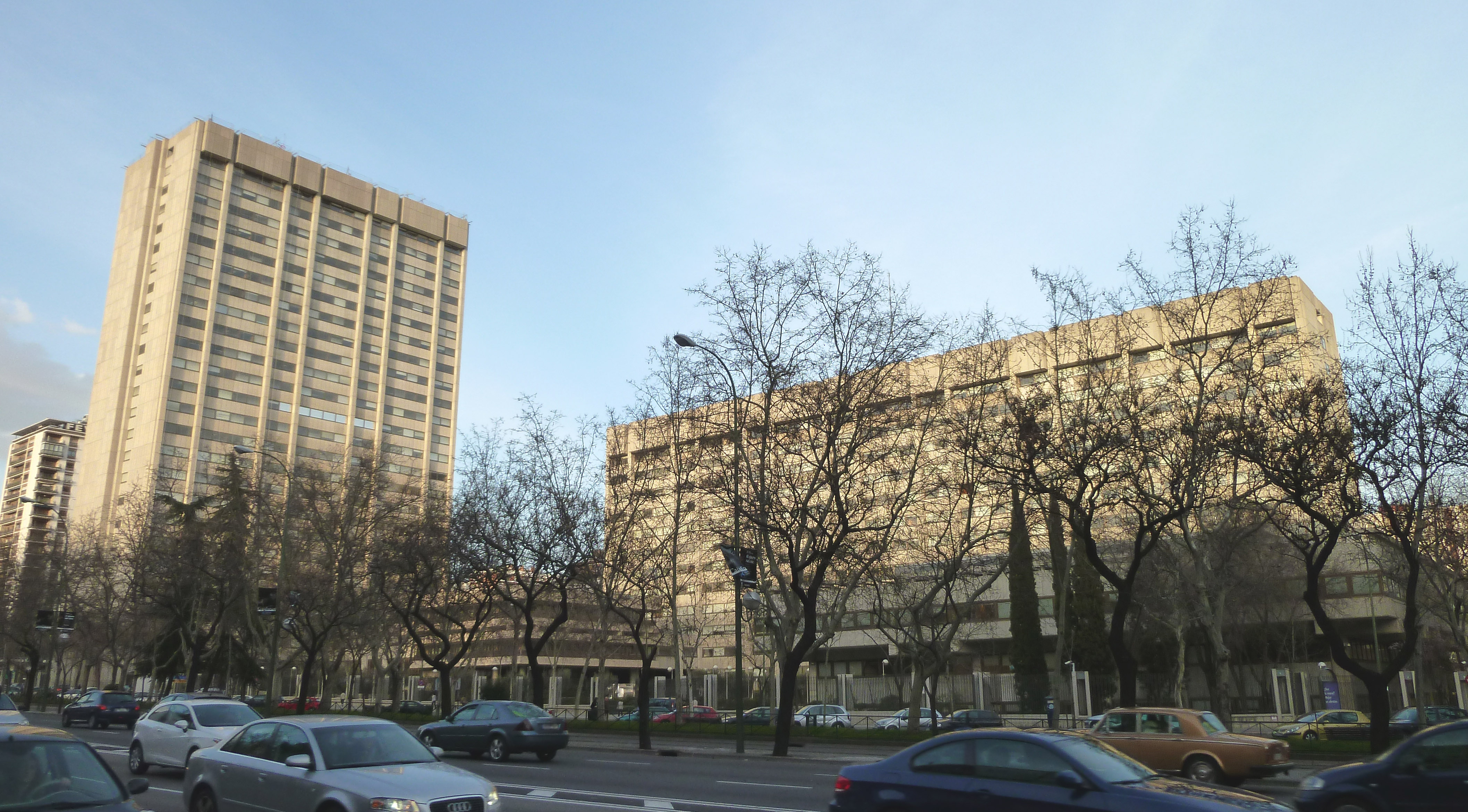
- Headquarters of the Ministry

Agency overview
- Formed: November 4, 2016
- Preceding agency: Ministry of Industry, Energy and Tourism
- Dissolved: June 7, 2018
- Superseding agencies: Ministry for the Ecological Transition; Ministry of Industry, Trade and Tourism; Ministry of Economy and Business
- Type: Ministry
- Jurisdiction: Spanish government
- Headquarters: Paseo de la Castellana 160, (Madrid)
- Minister responsible: Mr. Álvaro Nadal

The Ministry of Energy, Tourism and Digital Agenda (MINETAD) was a department of the Government of Spain which existed between 2016 and 2018 responsible for the design and implementation of the government policy on energy, tourism, telecoms, information society and Digital Agenda.

The Ministry was created for the first time in late 2016, assuming the powers of the Ministry of Industry on energy, tourism and telecoms.

However, it was dissolved in 2018 after the motion of no confidence against Rajoy's second government and its competences were distributed between three ministries: the Ministry for the Ecological Transition, which the assumed energy policy, the Ministry of Industry, Trade and Tourism, which assumed the commercial and tourism policies, and the Ministry of Economy and Business, which assumed everything relating to technologies.

== Structure ==
The Department of Energy, Tourism and Digital Agenda was structured in four higher bodies:

- The Secretariat of State for Energy, responsible for the government policy on energy.
- The Secretariat of State for the Information Society and the Digital Agenda, responsible for the government policy on telecommunications and digital agenda.
- The Secretariat of State for Tourism, responsible for the government policy on tourism.
- The Undersecretariat of Energy, Tourism and Digital Agenda, responsible for the day-to-day management of the Ministry.

== List of ministers ==
Name	Name (Birth–Death)	Term of office			Party	Government		Ref.
Name	Name (Birth–Death)	Took office	Left office	Duration	Party	Government		Ref.
	Álvaro Nadal (born 1970)	4 November 2016	7 June 2018	1 year and 215 days	People's Party	Mariano Rajoy (2011–2018)	Felipe VI (2014-present)	
