= Morales de Rey =

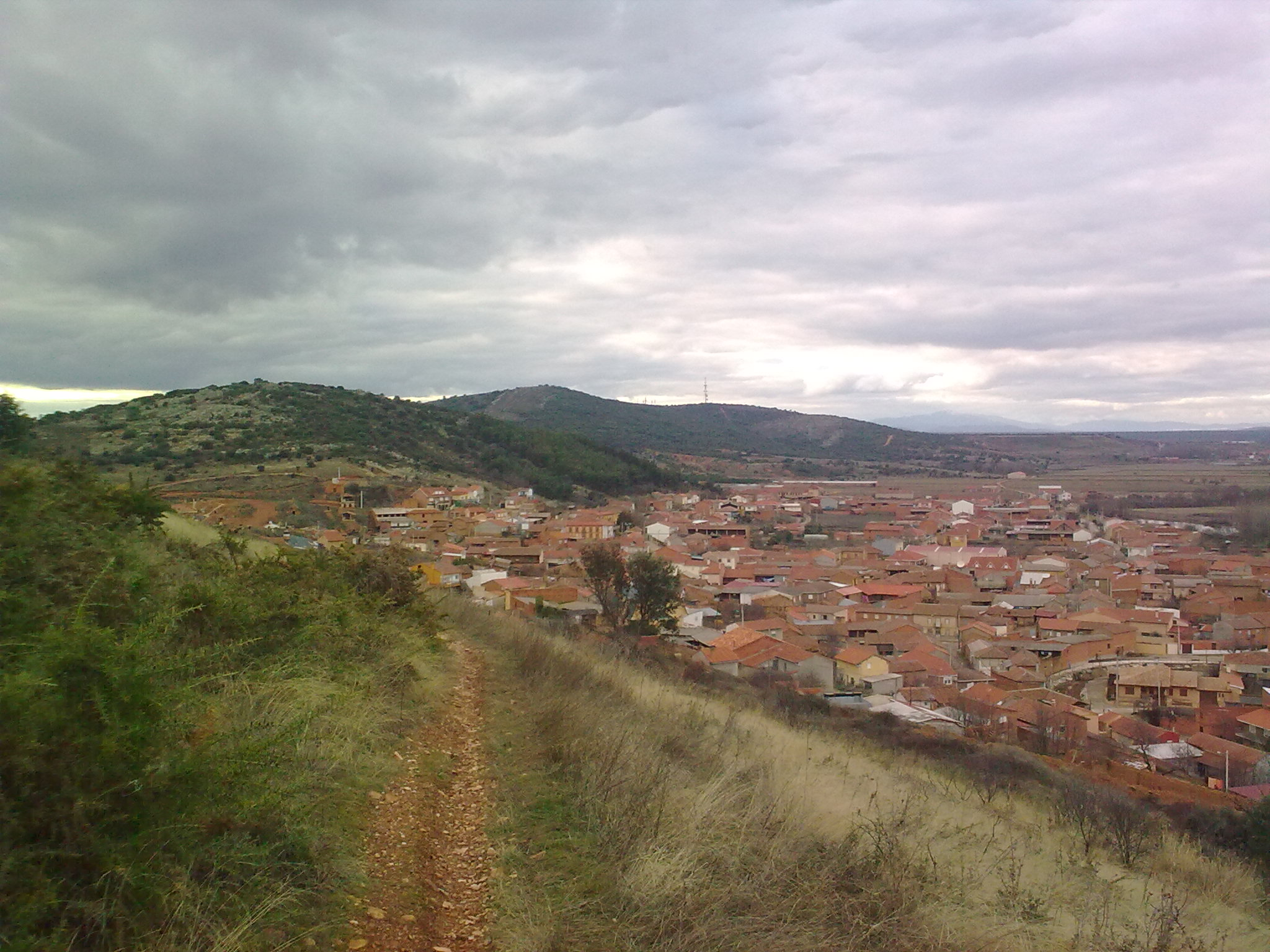
- Morales de Rey

- Coat of arms

- Location within Spain
- Coordinates: 42.067°N 5.787°W
- Country: Spain
- Autonomous community: Castile and León
- Province: Zamora
- Municipality: Morales de Rey

Area
  - Total: 20 km^{2} (7.7 sq mi)

Population (2025-01-01)
  - Total: 529
  - Density: 26/km^{2} (69/sq mi)
- Time zone: UTC+1 (CET)
  - Summer (DST): UTC+2 (CEST)

Morales de Rey is a municipality located in the province of Zamora, Castile and León, Spain. According to the 2004 census (INE), the municipality has a population of 714 inhabitants.
