= Spanish Institute for Foreign Trade =

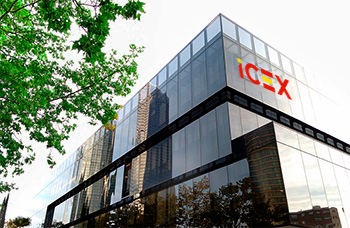
ICEX headquarters building in Madrid

The Spanish Institute for Foreign Trade (ICEX) (Spanish: Instituto Español de Comercio Exterior) is an agency of the Spanish Ministry of Industry, Tourism and Trade (Ministerio de Industria, Turismo y Comercio) which works worldwide with the objective of promoting the internationalization of Spanish companies in order to improve their competitiveness and to add value to the Spanish economy as a whole, as well as boosting foreign investment in Spain.

The Institute acts mainly in the following areas:

- It designs and carries out commercial promotion and investment programs in foreign markets.
- It prepares and provides information regarding international markets and the Spanish products offered.
- It promotes the teaching of technical skills to business people and the training of professionals in foreign trade.
- It provides customised advice and support through the Spanish network of Economic and Commercial Offices.
- ICEX is also one of the main Spanish publishers specialising in international trade: manuals, business guides and country data.

To effectively meet its objectives, ICEX is assisted by the network of Economic and Commercial Offices in the Spanish embassies (Red de Oficinas Económicas y Comerciales de las Embajadas de España en el Exterior) abroad and, within Spain, by the Regional and Territorial Trade Directorates. It also coordinates its programs with those of the Autonomous Regions, Chambers of Commerce, the Spanish Confederation of Employers' Organizations (CEOE), Collaborating Entities and other Spanish institutions related to international commerce in order to achieve a model of shared overseas promotion. The Centre for Economic and Commercial Studies (CECO) is an associated training centre through which ICEX assists in training young professionals (for example, with a scholarship program that includes an MBA in International Management").
