= José María Álvarez Mendizábal =

Spanish politician and lawyer

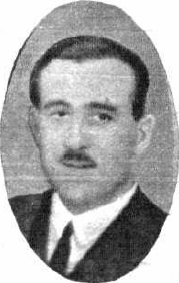
The picture of the Spanish politician, José María Álvarez Mendizàbal

José María Álvarez Mendizábal (August 14, 1891 in Las Pedroñeras – February 21, 1965) was a Spanish politician and lawyer.

He was a bourgeoisie landowner and entered politics with the proclamation of the Second Spanish Republic elected deputy to Congress of Cuenca (province) in the elections of 1931 and the election of 1933 representing the Radical Republican Party, and in the elections of 1936 independently. He served as Minister of Agriculture, Industry and Commerce between 30 December 1935 and 19 February 1936 in the government. He was presided over by Manuel Portela.
