= Joan Mesquida =

Spanish politician (1962–2020)

Joan Mesquida Ferrando (6 December 1962 – 19 October 2020) was a Spanish politician who served as a Deputy, having previously been Director-General of the Spanish National Police and Civil Guard.
