= Ministry of Industry (Spain) =

Government ministry of Spain

Ministry of Industry and Tourism
- Ministerio de Industria y Turismo

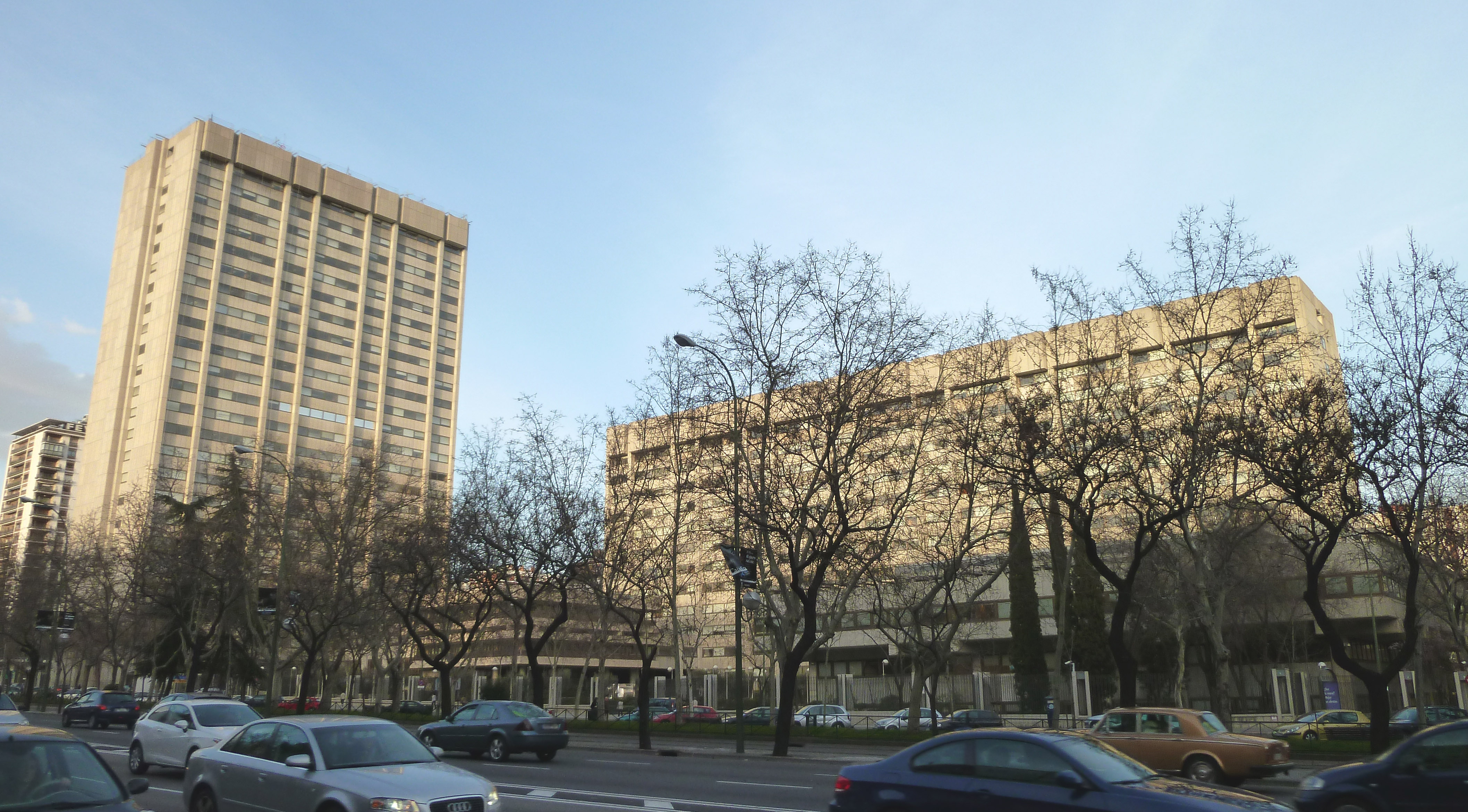
- The current headquarters in the Nuevos Ministerios complex.

Agency overview
- Formed: 4 November 1928; 97 years ago (as Ministry of National Economy)
- Preceding agencies: Ministry of Labour, Industry and Trade; Ministry of Development
- Type: Ministry
- Jurisdiction: Government of Spain
- Headquarters: 160 Paseo de la Castellana Madrid, Spain
- Employees: 1,582 (2024)
- Annual budget: € 8.5 billion, 2026
- Minister responsible: Jordi Hereu, Minister
- Agency executives: Jordi García Brustenga, Secretary of State for Industry; Rosario Sánchez Grau, Secretary of State for Tourism; Pablo Garde Lobo, Under-Secretary
- Child agencies: ICEX; Turespaña; Spanish Patent and Trademark Office; Spanish Metrology Centre; SEGITTUR
- Website: Ministry of Industry and Tourism(in Spanish)

The Ministry of Industry and Tourism (MINCOTUR) is the department of the Government of Spain responsible for designing and implementing the government policy on industry and tourism. This includes designing the industrial strategy and development, as well as fostering entrepreneurship and small and medium-sized enterprises and defending industrial property. At the international level, these powers are exercised in coordination with the Ministry of Foreign Affairs.

The Industry Ministry, along with the Defence Ministry, has an important presence in the military industry and it regularly grants loans to state-owned enterprises for the promotion of this industry and the realization of military projects. In the past, when it had commercial powers, it also oversaw the import and export of military and defense equipment.

The MINCOTUR was established in 1928 to unify the economic responsibilities of the various government departments. Originally, it was named as Ministry of National Economy and, except for a brief period when it was called Ministry of Agriculture, Industry and Trade (1931–1936), it has since been known as the Ministry of Industry.

== History ==
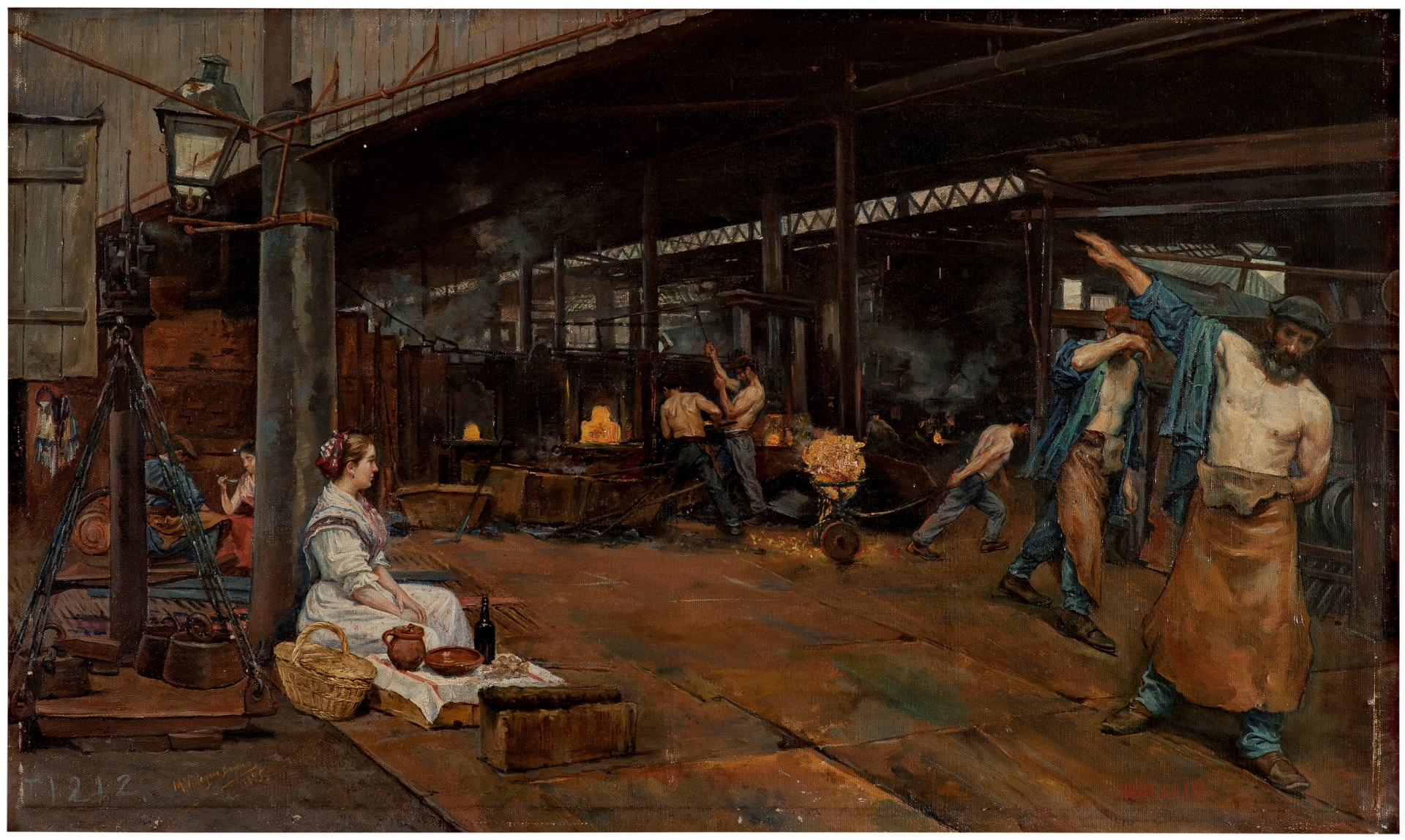
Painting by Manuel Villegas Brieva (1871–1923) depicting workers from the Altos Hornos de Vizcaya. Prado Museum

In the years prior to the creation of this department, economic and industrial matters were divided between the ministries of Finance and the Interior. When the latter was established in 1812, it was trusted with the powers of "political and economic government of the Kingdom [...], in everything that by law may pertain to the Government to promote and foster national agriculture and industry in all its branches, and in the public establishments of both [...] navigation and inland trade and everything corresponding to statistics and public economics".

From 1847, these responsibilities fell to the Ministry of Development, which would carry them out for the next eight decades, through a Directorate-General for Agriculture, Industry and Trade, with the exception of the period 1922–1928, when the newly created Ministry of Labour assumed the powers over Industry and Trade.

=== Twentieth century ===
The close relationship that today exists between the ministries of Industry and Economy is due to the fact that the origin of both, although in different times, is the same.

If the Ministry of Economy was founded in 1977 with the objective of "grouping a series of currently dispersed powers in matters of economic organization and planning" as well as "to singularize decisions on economic policy", fifty years earlier, in 1928, the Ministry of Industry—then called "of National Economy"—was created, with the similar objective of "putting under a single direction, coordinating them appropriately, the services that affect the national economy, both in the concept of production and in those of trade and consumption".

As happens in many other departments, the scope of competence and the approach with which it was created is different from what it has today, since back then it was a general coordinator and stimulator of the Spanish economy, with competences over agriculture, industry—which included intellectual property—, trade, supplies and metrology. The Industrial Engineers Crops was incorporated to this department and it inherited an important territorial structure from the Ministry of Development, since it had "Provincial Industry Inspections" distributed throughout the provinces since the beginning of the 1920s.

The Ministry was integrated by the following bodies:

- The National Economy Council, transferred from the Office of the Prime Minister, and all its committees, consortia, and commissariats. It was chaired by the minister.
- The Directorate-General for Agriculture, transferred from the Ministry of Development, including the Agronomic Council, the Agricultural Chambers, and all institutes, schools, stations, and establishments for agricultural or livestock education.
- The Directorate-General for Trade and Supplies—which grouped the trade responsabilities of the Ministry of Labour and those about supplies of the Ministry of the Interior—including the Export Monitoring Committee, the National Board on Spanish Trade Overseas, the Chambers of Commerce, Navigation, and Books; the Associations of Commercial Agents; the Service of National and International Fairs and Exhibitions; and the Central and Provincial Supply Boards.
- The Directorate-General for Industry, transferred from the Ministry of Labour, including the Industrial Property Registry; the Corps and Schools of Industrial Engineers; the Standing Commission on Electricity, as well as those on Industry and Automobile Affairs; the Associations of Industrial Property Agents; the Industrial Council; the Chambers of Industry; the Service for Inspection of Weights and Measures; the Service of Meter and Automobile Inspectors; and the Ministry’s auxiliary Secretariat.

The following year, a new Directorate-General for Tariffs, Treaties and Valuations was created, to unify the National Economy Council's functions about trade tariffs, agreements and valuations.

This first stage ends at the beginning of the Second Republic, when prime minister Manuel Azaña renamed the department as Ministry of Agriculture, Industry and Trade.

==== Second Republic and Dictatorship ====
The importance of the economic area and the important role played by the primary sector in the Spanish economy at the beginning of the 20th century—the population dedicated to agriculture accounted for nearly 50% of the total active population— was evident from the beginning, since as early as 1900 the term "Agriculture" began to appear in the names of some government departments, such as the Ministry of Development, named from 1900 to 1905 as Ministry of Agriculture, Industry, Trade and Public Works. As mentioned, in 1931 the Ministry of National Economy was renamed as "Ministry of Agriculture, Industry and Trade".

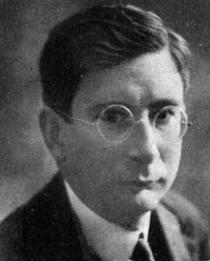
Minister Marcelino Domingo, promoter of the 1932 Agrarian Reform Law

During this period, the department designed the Agrarian Reform Law, which was approved by the Cortes on 10 August 1932. This law, promoted by minister Marcelino Domingo, established a policy of expropriation with compensation for the owners of large estates—except for the Grandees, who were punished for the Sanjurjada with expropriations without compensation—with the aim of converting the land into smallholdings that could be distributed among day laborers and thus improve both the conditions of the workers and the productivity of the land.

From June 1933—with a brief merger between September 1935 and February 1936—, the ministry lost its powers over agriculture, which were transferred to the newly established Ministry of Agriculture, which was being created for the first time. At that time, the Ministry of Industry and Trade was structured through the directorates-general for Industry, Trade and Tariff Policy, for Mines and Fuels and the National Economy Council.

After losing its agricultural functions during the republic, the dictatorship of Francisco Franco meant the loss of another of its major areas of activity: trade. So much so that, in 1951, the Francoist government reinstated a ministry that had briefly existed during the previous republican period, the Ministry of Trade. In the opinion of the leaders at that time, "commercial activity, in which world circumstances make greater attention from States inexcusable, especially in its two most important aspects, supplies and foreign currency, has now reached such an extent that it completely absorbs the activity of a Ministry, given the dimensions and complexity of the problems in which the Administration is obliged to intervene. On the other hand, the industrial development of the country and the necessary promotion of mining and the production of energy and basic materials, contain within themselves more than enough scope to also absorb all the activities of a single ministerial department".

===== 1939 Industry Law =====
Years before, in 1939, two relevant industrial laws were approved. First, the Law of 24 October 1939, on the Protection of New Industries of National Interest and, later, the Law of 24 November 1939, on Industry Regulation and Defence. The latter was the axis around which industrial policy revolved during the dictatorship and some of its precepts remained in force until the approval of the 1992 Industry Law.

This law subordinated industry to the State's public interest, prohibited the installation of new industry without government authorization, established price controls, set the working conditions of this sector and its inspection, regulated the State's capacity to intervene to guide industrial policy and the obligation to priorized the product manufactured in Spain, as well as its level of quality, also requiring that companies of national interest have Spanish leadership, establishing a minimum Spanish share capital in companies of 75 % and introducing rules to protect and prioritize national production.

To supervise the implementation of industrial laws and to promote and finance new industries, the National Institute of Industry (INI) was established in 1941. Its role was central, serving as the main channel through which the Spanish government directed industrial policy. The INI's total liabilities grew dramatically over the decades, from ₧0.5 million in 1941 to ₧1.04 trillion in 1986. Adjusted to constant prices, this corresponds roughly to ₧97 million in 1941 and ₧4.7 billion in 1986. By 1960, the INI's liabilities alone accounted for about 8.2% of Spanish GDP, illustrating its significant weight in the national economy.

===== 1959 Stabilization Plan =====
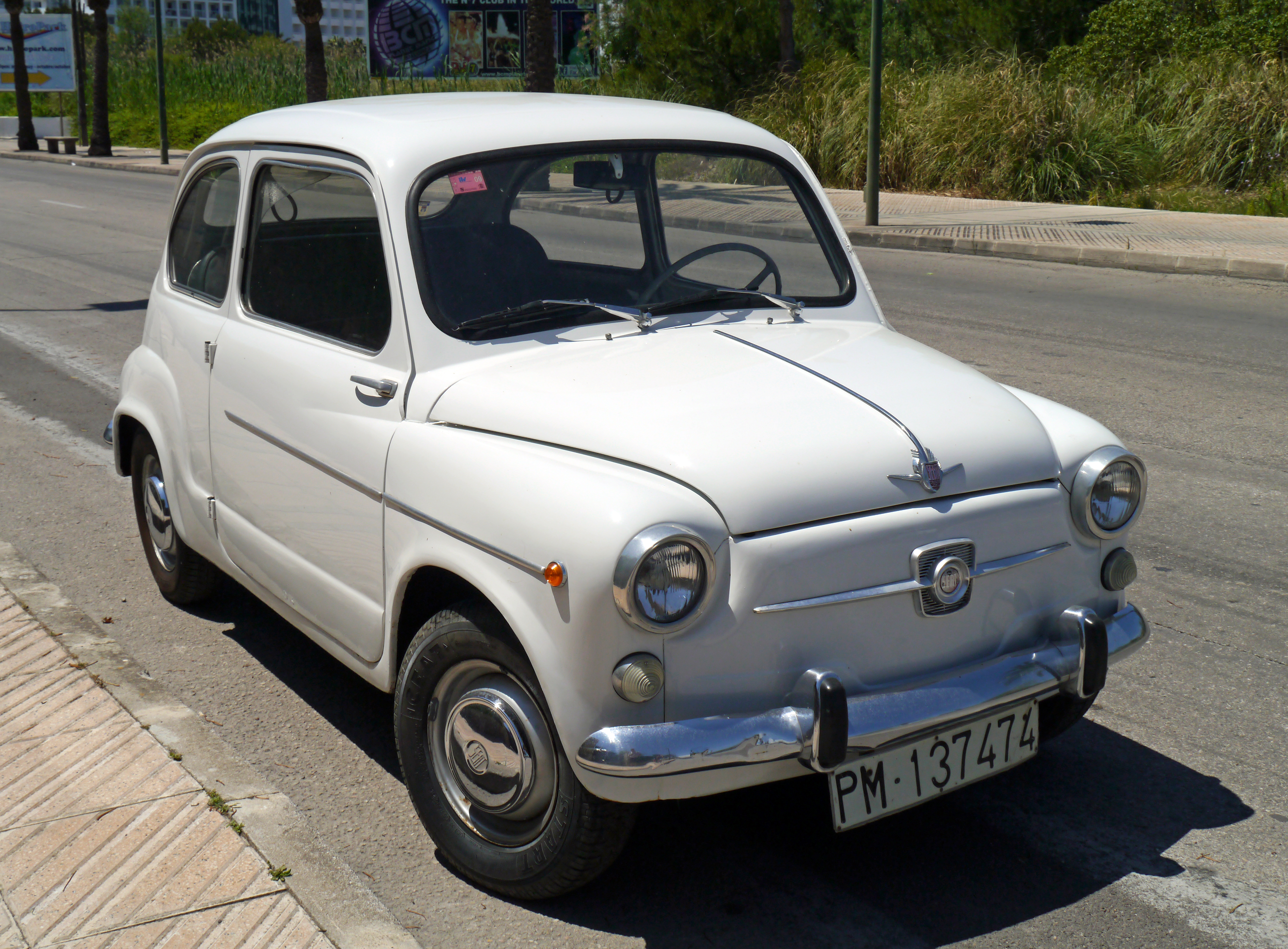
The SEAT 600, a car that symbolized development in Spain in the 1960s. The SEAT 600 was also a symbol of the new mass consumer society and the so-called Spanish economic miracle

Two decades later, the autarkic nature of the dictatorship's early years came to an end with the implementation of the 1959 Stabilization Plan. This plan aimed to achieve economic stability through the prior stabilization of the national currency—by raising the exchange rate against the dollar and through loans from international organizations and the United States federal government—, the control of inflation—with measures such as interest rate rises and wage freezes—, the implementation of new legislation to encourage foreign investment, a tax reform to increase revenue, and the limitation of public spending. This plan also sought to introduce a gradual liberalization of industry, in contrast to the objectives of the 1939 law.

The stabilizing effects were noticeable in the very short term, both internally and in the external balance:

- In 1959, the balance of payments surplus reached $81 million.
- The Bank of Spain's foreign exchange reserves increased. The sum of foreign reserves and short-term government loans went from a negative balance of nearly $2 million in June 1959 to a positive balance of nearly $500 million in December 1960.
- Inflation fell from 12.6 percent in 1958 to 2.4 percent in 1960.
- Foreign investment in Spain and tourism increased.
- Competitive conditions in the country improved, and new technologies were adopted.

===== Energy importance =====
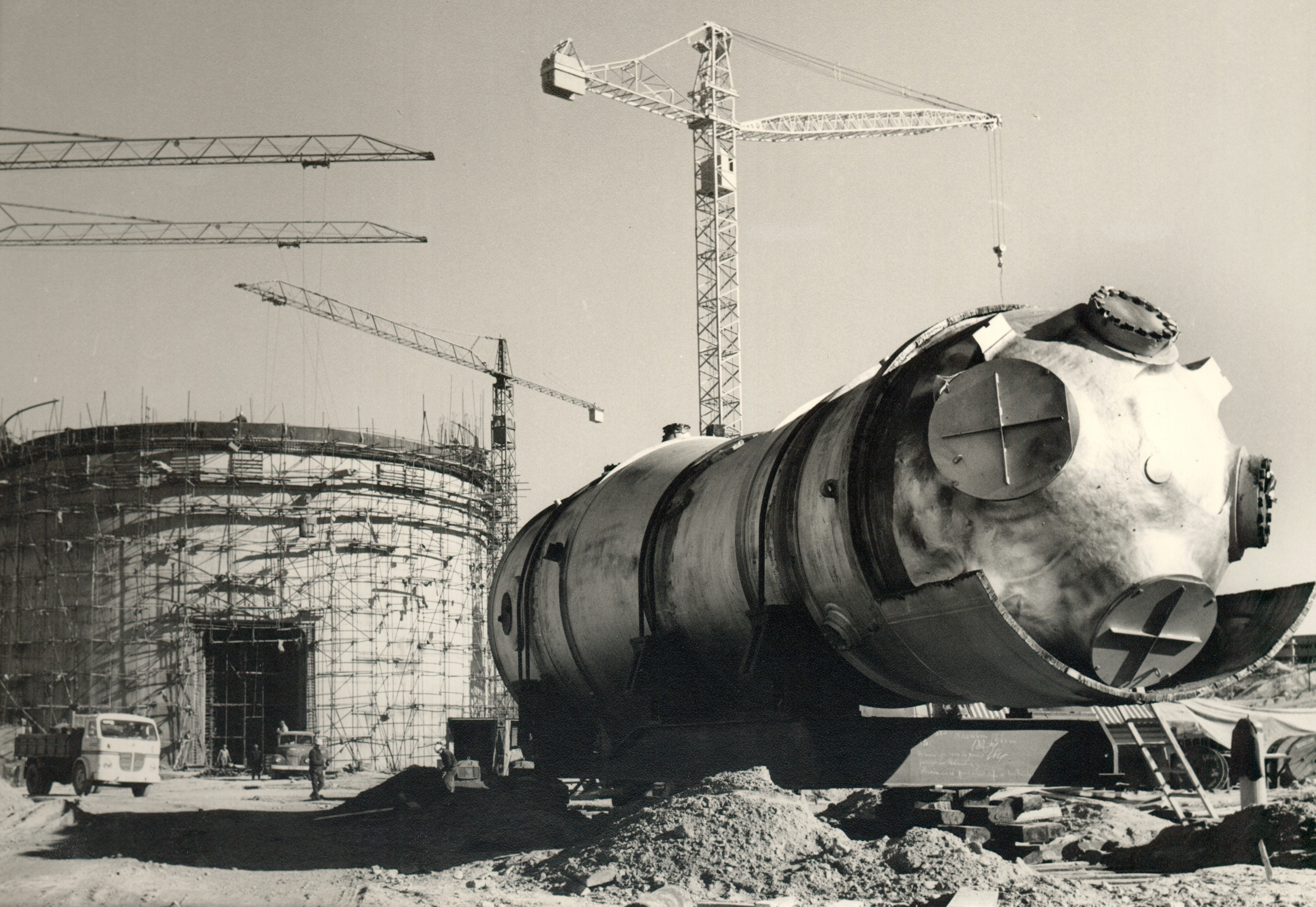
Construction of the José Cabrera Nuclear Power Station in 1966, the first nuclear power plant built in Spain

As the country's economy took off and Spain emerged from autarky, energy production had to increase again to sustain that growth: the exploitation of lignite and other domestic coal deposits, as well as the construction of new dams and oil refineries. Furthermore, Spain was a pioneer in the development of nuclear power for electricity generation, inaugurating its first plant in 1969. However, the first oil crisis hit in 1973, followed by the 1979 crisis, which severely disrupted the global economy, including Spain's.

In this context, in 1962 the Directorate-General for Energy was created, which would later also assume the powers over fuels of the Directorate-General for Mines and Fuels and, from the oil crisis of the 1970s, a Commission for Energy and Mineral Resources was created in 1977, with the category of under-secretariat, which would culminate with the creation of the Secretariat of State for Energy and Mineral Resources in 1996.

During the Spanish transition to democracy, the Industry Ministry was renamed "Ministry of Industry and Energy" with responsibilities on the industrial and energy policies. By 1979, the ministry's structure was quite substantial, with seven directorates-general (for Mines and Construction Industries, for Energy, for Iron and Steel and Naval Industries, for Chemical and Textile Industries, for Food and Other Industries, for Technology and Industrial Safety, and for Services), the Undersecretariat and the Commission for Energy and Mineral Resources.

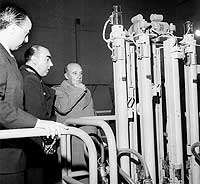
Francisco Franco and Luis Carrero Blanco during a visit to the "Juan Vigón" Nuclear Energy National Centre in 1958

Spain's nuclear program was halted in the 1980s following the rise in environmental awareness brought about by the Chernobyl disaster and the energy policy shifted towards another energy resource: natural gas. Perceived at the time as less dangerous, the Maghreb–Europe Gas Pipeline was built to bring the supply from Algeria, passing through Morocco, along with gasification stations to receive the LNG tankers. In 2011, another direct gas pipeline from Algeria to Spain was inaugurated across the Alboran Sea.

Also in the 1980s, the Nuclear Energy Board (Spanish: Junta de Energía Nuclear, JEN) underwent a major transformation. Law 15/1980, of April 22, created the Nuclear Safety Council (CSN), an independent agency that replaced the JEN in its nuclear safety and security and radiological protection responsibilities. As for the JEN, which retained all powers relating to scientific and technological research in the field of energy, by Law 13/1986, of April 14, it was renamed as the Centre for Energy, Environmental and Technological Research (CIEMAT).

In the early 1990s, it briefly resumed trade responsibilities through the Secretariat of State for Trade (1991–1993). It was also organized through a Secretariat of State for Industry, four general secretariats (for Energy and Mineral Resources, for Tourism, for Industrial Promotion and Technology, and for Trade) and nine directorates-general.

In 1992, the department fostered a new Industry Law—still in force—which established the new regulatory framework governing industrial activities, defining them as "activities aimed at obtaining, repairing, maintaining, transforming, or reusing industrial products, packaging, as well as the use, recovery, and disposal of waste or by-products, whatever the nature of the resources and technical processes used. Also included are [...] engineering, design, technological consulting, and technical assistance services directly related to industrial activities".

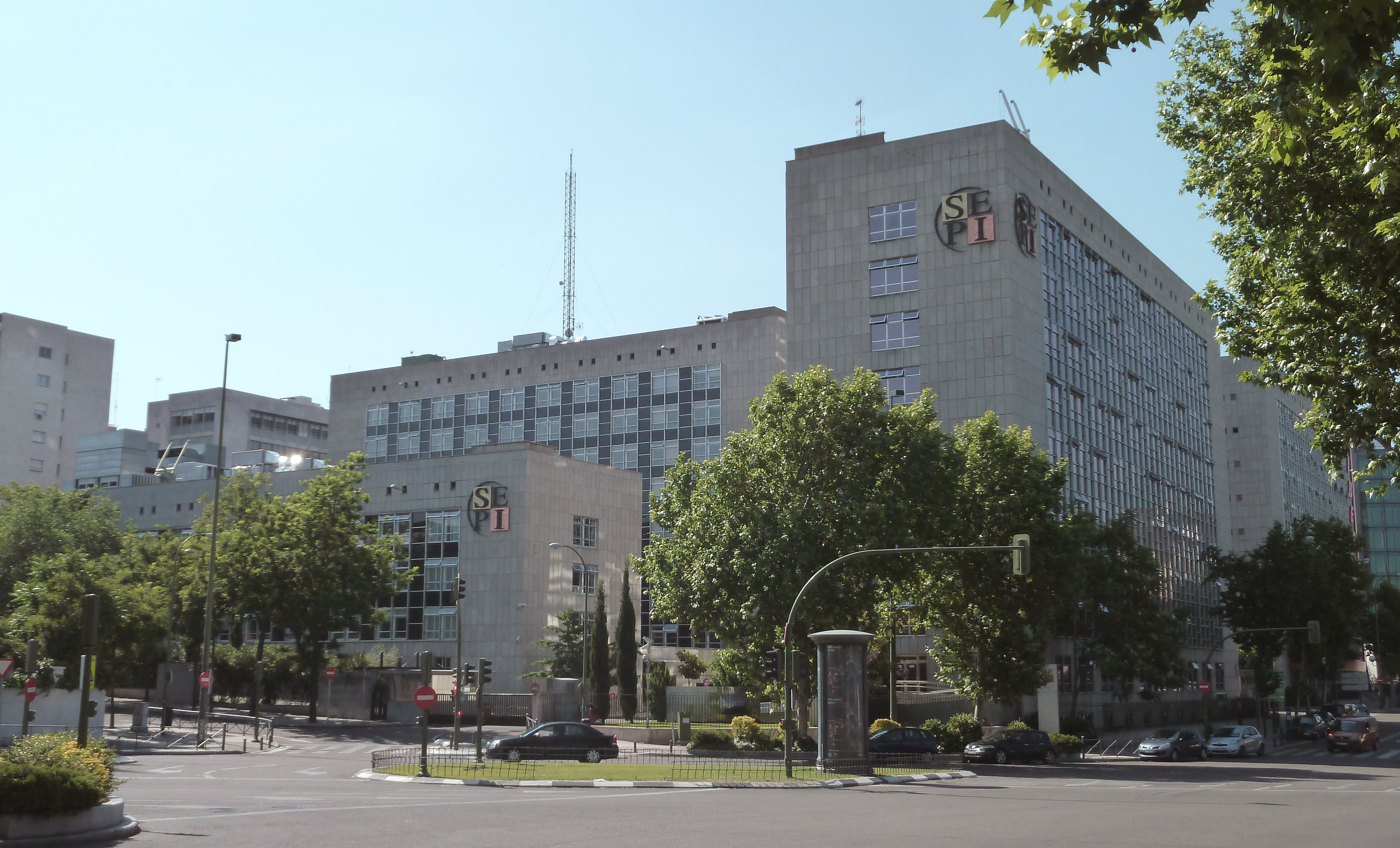
From 1995 to 2000, the SEPI was part of the Industry Ministry

At the same time, the Government authorized the National Institute of Industry to create TENEO, a public enterprise that would assume all of the INI's business activities. In 1995, the INI was dissolved and replaced by the State Industrial Agency (AIE) and the State Company for Industrial Investments (SEPI), the latter of which absorbed the TENEO Group. Two years later, SEPI incorporated the AIE's companies into its assets, confirming its dissolution. The National Hydrocarbons Institute, created in 1981 to manage the INI's petroleum businesses, it was dissolved after privatizing a large part of its assets, including the multinational Repsol, with the remainder being integrated into SEPI. The SEPI was transferred to the Ministry of Finance in 2000, and since then, both the SEPI and the Directorate-General for State Assets, which fall under the Ministry of Finance, have managed most state-owned or state-participated enterprises.

Likewise, the territorial structure of the ministry was also reorganized, transforming the Territorial and Provincial Directorates of Industry into Functional Areas of Industry and Energy, attached to the Government Delegations.

=== Present ===
Between 2000 and 2004 the ministry was abolished and its functions were divided between the Ministry of Economy (energy) and the Ministry of Science and Technology (industry). However, this situation made it difficult to maintain relations with different industrial sectors, as was the case with the automotive sector, which in 2002 did not know who to contact and, when they were attended to, were referred to another department. This situation was reversed in 2004, when the Ministry was re-established and entrusted again with responsibilities for industry, trade, tourism and energy, complemented by others concerning SMEs and telecommunications.

In the period 2011–2016, the department lost its powers over trade to the Ministry of Economy and Competitiveness and, between 2016 and 2018, the department was abolished, as the industrial powers were transferred to the Ministry of Economy, Industry and Competitiveness and the rest of them, that is, those over energy, tourism, telecommunications and information society, were grouped in the new Ministry of Energy, Tourism and Digital Agenda. This situation lasted barely a year and a half and, in June 2018, the department with responsibilities in industry, trade and tourism was recovered, but it did not recover either the energy powers, which were transferred to the Ministry for the Ecological Transition, or the digital powers, which were transferred to the Ministry of Economy and Business.

PRTR's logo

With no changes for the next five years, the Recovery, Transformation and Resilience Plan (Plan de Recuperación, Transformación y Resiliencia , PRTR) was approved during this stage as a consequence of the COVID-19 pandemic. Within this economic plan, a new public-private collaboration mechanism was created in 2020: the Strategic Project for Economic Recovery and Transformation (Spanish: Proyecto Estratégico para la Recuperación y Transformación Económica, PERTE). This new mechanism sought to channel Next Generation EU funds to achieve a rapid economic recovery around the energy transition and digitalization; in this sense, the department supervised four PERTEs: for the agri-food industry, for industrial decarbonization, for the shipbuilding industry and for the electric vehicle.

On 20 November 2023, the trade affairs were transferred to the Ministry of Economy. The two remaining areas of the Department—industry and tourism—were restructured. On the one hand, with regard to industry, the Secretariat of State for Industry, which had already existed in the 1990s, was reinstated, while the General Secretariat for Industry and SMEs and the Directorate-General for Industry and SMEs were eliminated, the latter being split into two: the Directorate-General for Industrial Strategy and Small and Medium-Sized Enterprises and the Directorate-General for Industrial Programs. Regarding tourism, the area was strengthened with a Directorate-General for Tourism Policies.

== Organization ==
Organizational chart of the Spanish Ministry of Industry, April 2024

The minister of industry and tourism, a member of the Council of Ministers, is the most senior official of the department and established the government policies on these areas.

The minister is assisted by two secretaries of state, one for industry and other for tourism, and an under-secretary who manages the day-to-day operations of the ministry.

The current structure of the Ministry is the following:

Ministry Organization (2026)
Minister	Cabinet
Secretary of State for Industry	Directorate-General for Industrial Strategy and Small and Medium Enterprises
Secretary of State for Industry	Directorate-General for Industrial Programs
Secretary of State for Industry	Special Commissioner for the Agri-Food Sector
Secretary of State for Industry	Special Commissioner for Industrial Decarbonization
Secretary of State for Industry	Division of Industrial Statistics, Information Analysis and Reports
Secretary of State for Industry	Spanish Metrology Centre
Secretary of State for Industry	EOI Business School
Secretary of State for Tourism	Directorate-General for Tourism Policies
Secretary of State for Tourism	Turespaña
Secretary of State for Tourism	Paradores
Under-Secretary	Technical General Secretariat
Under-Secretary	Deputy Directorate-General for Administrative and Financial Affairs
Under-Secretary	Deputy Directorate-General for IT and Communications
Under-Secretary	Budget Office
Under-Secretary	Deputy Directorate-General for Services Inspection and Relations with Citizens
Under-Secretary	Deputy Directorate-General for Human Resources
Under-Secretary	Spanish Patent and Trademark Office

=== National Authority for the Prohibition of Chemical Weapons ===
To fulfill the commitments undertaken by Spain in relation to the Chemical Weapons Convention, there is the National Authority for the Prohibition of Chemical Weapons (Spanish: Autoridad Nacional para la Prohibición de las Armas Químicas, ANPAQ). This authority, which is responsible for the planning, coordination, and monitoring of all matters related to said Convention, is chaired by Secretary of State for Foreign Affairs, while the Secretary of State for Industry and the Secretary-General for Defence Policy act as deputy chairs.

Additionally, integrated within the Ministry of Industry and Tourism is a General Secretariat, with the rank of Deputy Directorate-General, as the executive body of ANPAQ. This body is responsible for communications with the Organisation for the Prohibition of Chemical Weapons (OPCW), supervises compliance with the Convention and the proper conduct of inspections, and guarantees the confidentiality of information.

== Headquarters ==
The main headquarters of the Ministry of Industry and Tourism is located at number 160 Paseo de la Castellana (Madrid). This location houses the Cuzco Complex, a government complex that the Department of Industry shares with the ministries of Economy, of Science, Innovation and Universities, and some units of the ministries of Finance and for Ecological Transition and the Demographic Challenge.

The Secretariat of State for Tourism is located at number 41 Poeta Joan Maragall Street, opposite the World Tourism Organization (UNWTO). Finally, the public bodies attached to the department also have their own separate headquarters.

=== Historic headquarters ===
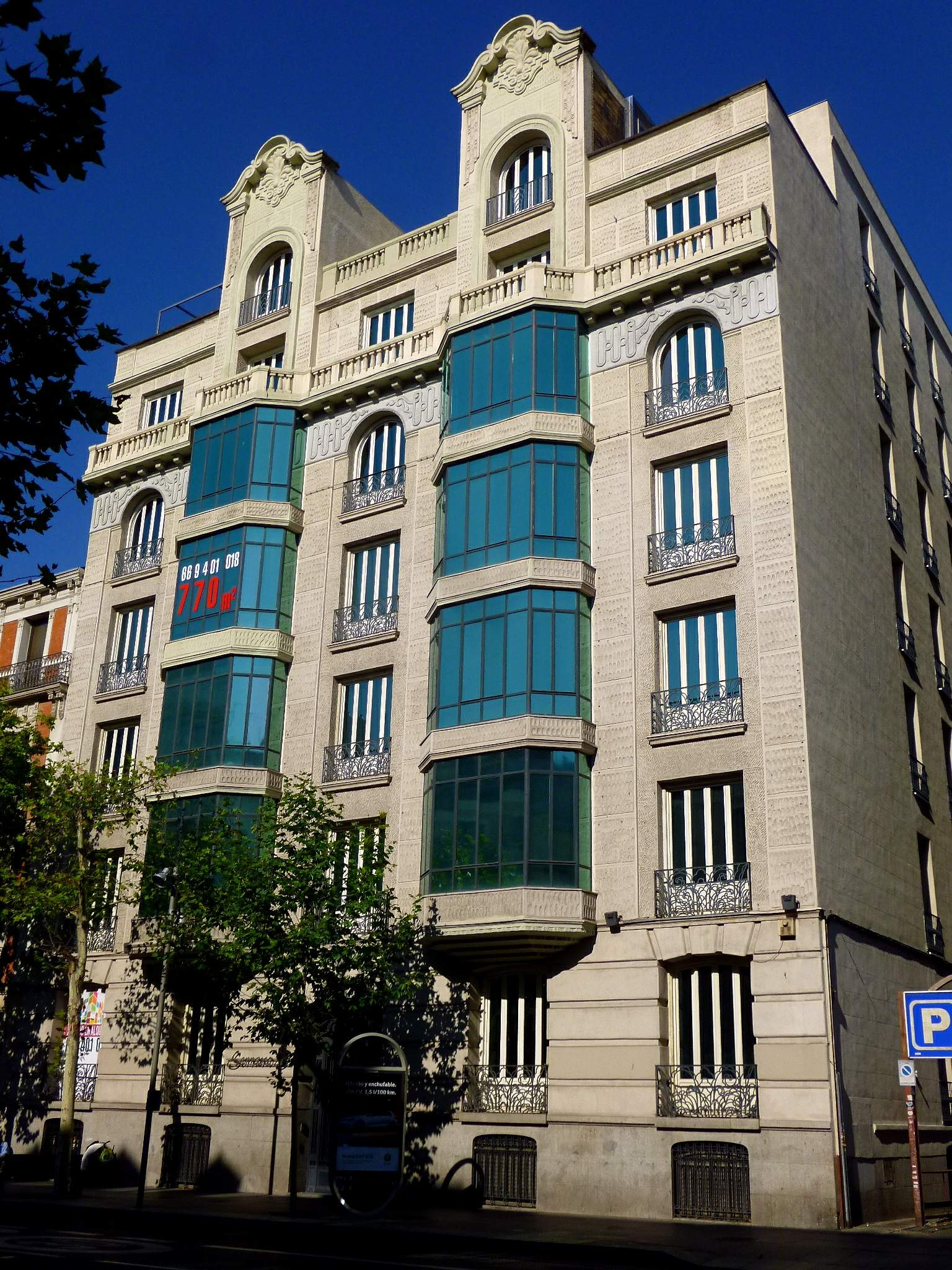
37 Serrano Street

Initially, the services of the Ministry of National Economy were housed in the headquarters of their predecessor departments, primarily at the Palacio de Fomento building. Over time, the department's growth necessitated larger offices, and during the Second Republic, it moved to number 37 Serrano Street in Madrid.

Years later, starting in the 1950s, architect Antonio Perpiñá Sebriá was commissioned to design a government complex to house the ministries of Industry and Trade. The project consisted of five buildings: two main ones (one for each department) and three smaller ones, as well as ample underground space. As Perpiñá had stipulated, the Ministry of Industry moved into these buildings of the Cuzco Complex between the 1970s and 1980s.

== Budget ==
In millions of euros (€)
1. Industrial policy 4,896.2 (57.6%)
2. Research and development 1,934 (22.7%)
3. Tourism policy 1,091.5 (12.8%)
4. SMEs 450.1 (5.29%)
5. Regulation & control 67.3 (0.79%)
6. Central services 62 (0.73%)

For fiscal year 2026, the Ministry of Industry and Tourism has a consolidated budget of €8.5 billion. Of this amount, €8.3 billion are directly managed by the ministry's central services while €185.1 million are managed by its agencies.

In the case, its current budget is heavily influenced by European funds from Next Generation EU, accounting for approximately 60%. These funds mainly finance investment in digitalisation, sustainability and innovation.

The budget programs can be divided into six main areas:

1. Central Services (Program 421M & 921U), which finances the ministry's general administration services.
2. Industrial policy (422B, 422M, 42LB, 46LB, 49LB & 42MA), which cover active policies aimed at improving industrial competitiveness.
3. Tourism policy (432A, 43NA, 43NB, 43NC, 43ND & 46NB), which finance policies focused on modernising and improving competitiveness in the tourism sector.
4. Research and development (467C, 464B & 46SC), which finance industry-related R&D&I programs. A significant share of this area is driven by programs supporting defence-related technological innovation.
5. SMEs (433M, 43MA, 43MB & 43MC), which support small and medium-sized enterprises.
6. Regulation and control (421N, 421O & 495C), which finance industrial quality control programs and regulating agencies such as the Metrology Centre or the Patent Office.

In addition, Programme 000X ("Internal Transfers and Disbursements") is excluded from the analysis, as it consists of transfers between public sector entities and would otherwise lead to double counting and distort the overall budget.

=== Audit ===
The Ministry's accounts, as well as those of its agencies, are internally audited by the Office of the Comptroller General of the State (IGAE), through a Delegated Comptroller's Office within the Department itself. Externally, the Court of Auditors is responsible for auditing expenditures. Likewise, the Congress of Deputies and Senate Committees on Industry and Tourism exercise political control over the accounts.

== See also ==
- Comisión Nacional de Energía (Spain)
- IDAE

== Bibliography ==
- Moreno-Torres Gálvez, Antonio (2018). "Génesis y evolución reglamentaria del Cuerpo de Ingenieros Industriales del Estado" [Genesis and regulatory evolution of the State Corps of Industrial Engineers]. El Cuerpo de Ingenieros Industriales del Estado. Historia, Actuaciones y Testimonios [The State Corps of Industrial Engineers: History, Actions, and Testimonies] (PDF) (in Spanish). Ministry of Industry, Trade and Tourism. pp. 11–52. Archived from the original (PDF) on 4 June 2023 – via Official Association of Industrial Engineers of the Valencian Community.
