= 10th Cortes Generales =

Spanish legislators

Overview
- Legislative body: Cortes Generales
- Jurisdiction: Spain
- Meeting place: Palacio de las Cortes
- Term: 13 December 2011 – 27 October 2015
- Election: 2011 general election
- Members: 350 (Congress); 266 (Senate)
- President of the Congress: Jesús Posada (PP)
- President of the Senate: Pío García-Escudero (PP)
- Prime Minister: Mariano Rajoy (PP)
- Leader of the Opposition: Alfredo Pérez Rubalcaba (PSOE) (2011–14); Pedro Sánchez (PSOE) (2014–15)

The 10th Cortes Generales comprised both the lower (Congress) and upper (Senate) houses of the legislature of Spain following the 2011 general election on 20 November 2011. They first convened on 13 December 2011, and were dissolved on 27 October 2015.

The 2011 election saw 52 constituencies return 350 MPs for Congress and 208 for Senate. The People's Party (PP), led by Mariano Rajoy, obtained an absolute majority of seats with 186. The Spanish Socialist Workers' Party (PSOE) had its worst performance until that time and secured 110 seats. Minoritary parties United Left (IU) and Union, Progress and Democracy (UPyD) came out reinforced, with 11 and 5 seats, respectively, and over 1 million votes each.

== Congress of Deputies ==
=== Composition ===
Parliamentary Group	Dec 2011	Jan 2012	Jun 2015	Oct 2015
People's Group	185	185	185	185
Socialist Group	110	110	↓109	↑110
Convergence and Union Catalan Group	16	16	16	16
Plural Left Group	14	↓11	11	11
Union, Progress and Democracy Group	6	↓5	5	↓4
PNV Basque Group	5	5	5	5
Mixed Group	13	↑18	↑19	↓18
Vacant	1	–	–	–
