= National Cybersecurity Institute =

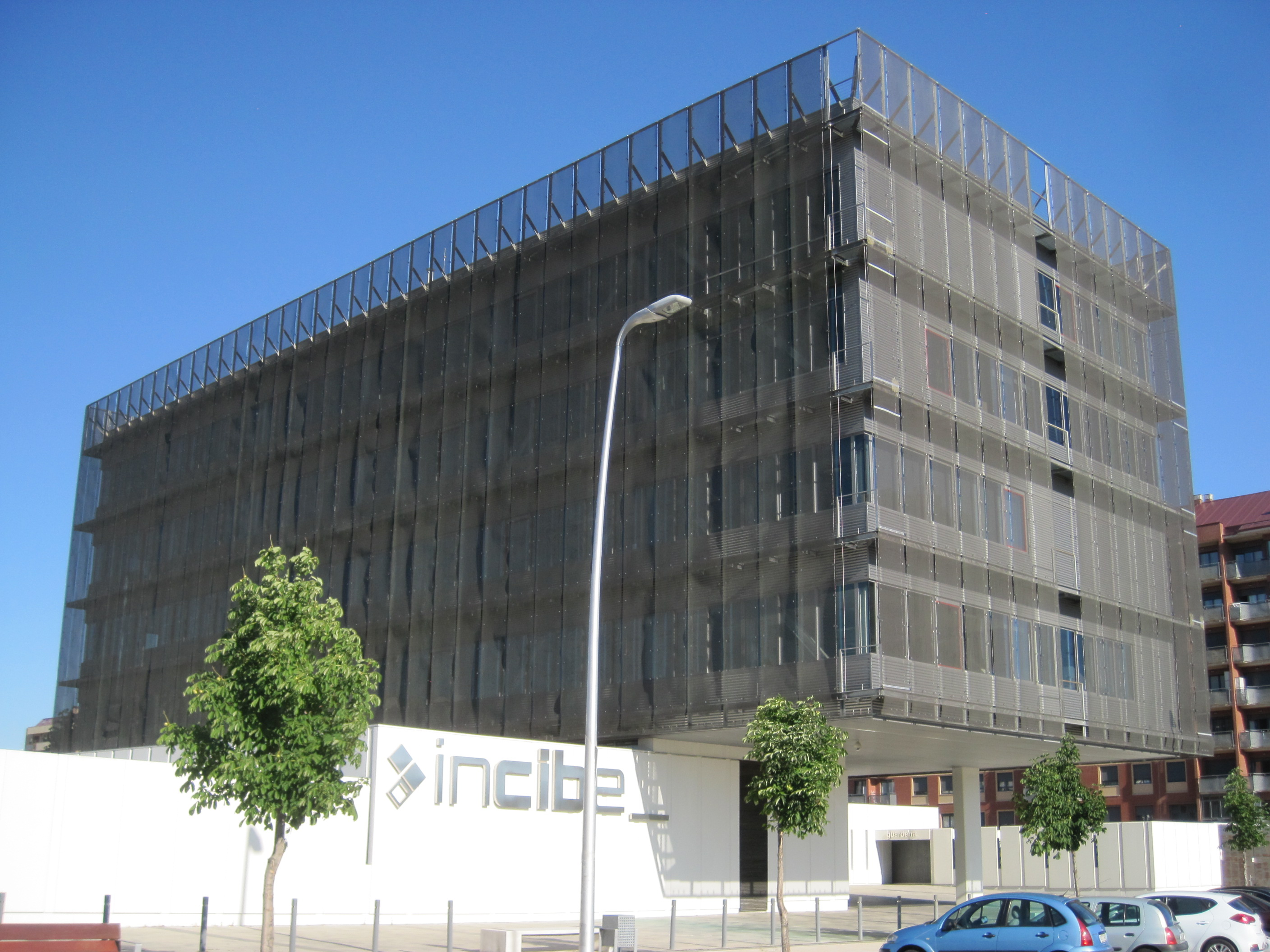
- Sede INCIBE, in León, Spain

Agency overview
- Formed: February 8, 2006; 20 years ago
- Jurisdiction: Spanish government
- Headquarters: León, Spain
- Employees: Around 200
- Annual budget: €720 million, 2023
- Parent department: Department for Digital Transformation and Civil Service

The National Cybersecurity Institute (Spanish: Instituto Nacional de Ciberseguridad, INCIBE), formerly known as the National Institute for Communication Technologies, is a cyber security agency under the jurisdiction of the Ministry of Digital Transformation through the Secretary of State for Telecommunications.

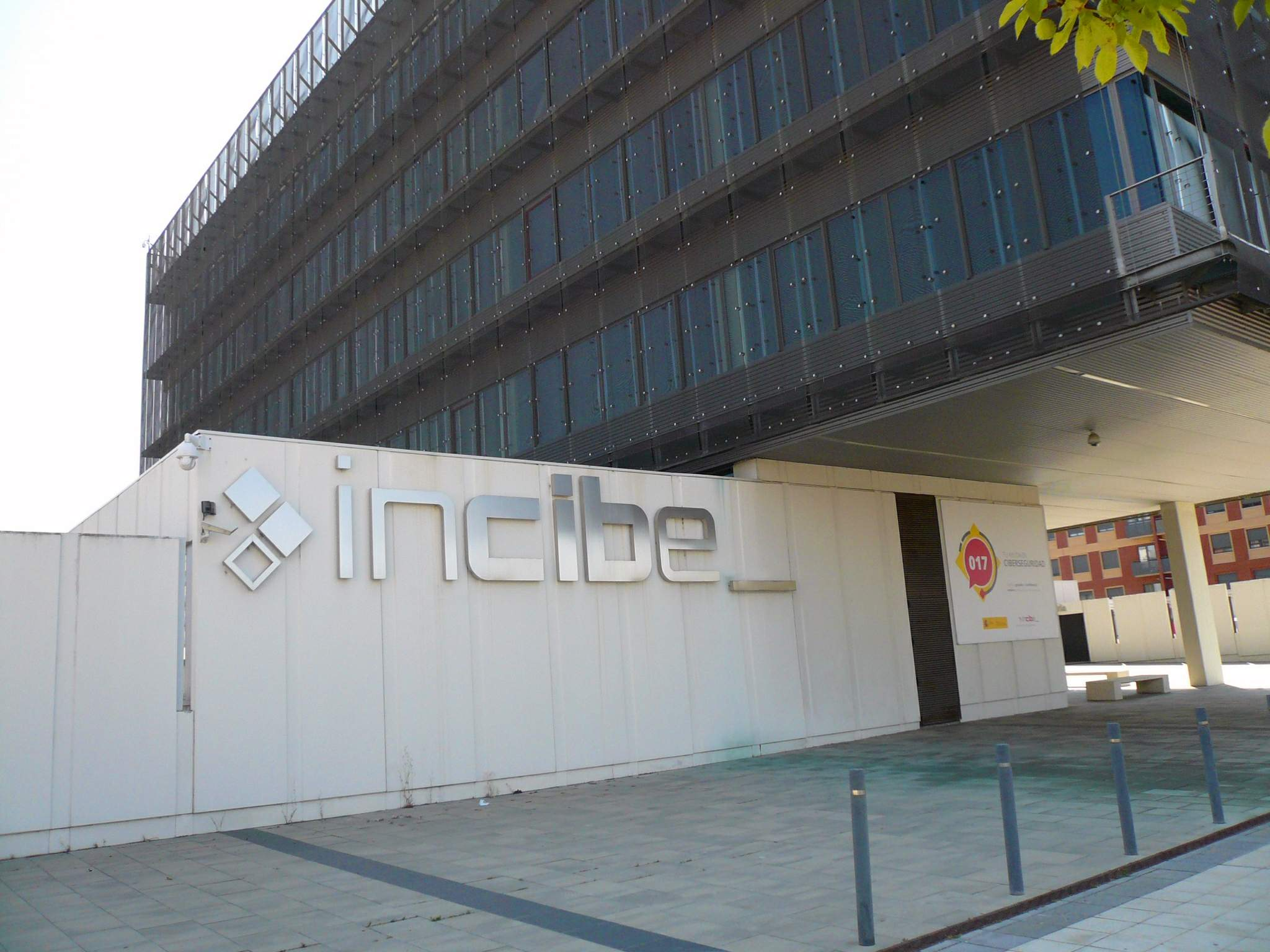
INCIBE

== See also ==
- ENISA
- Ministry of Digital Transformation (Spain)
- European Cybersecurity Competence Centre
