= Third government of Pedro Sánchez =

2023–present government of Spain

3rd government of Pedro Sánchez
- Government of Spain
- 2023–present
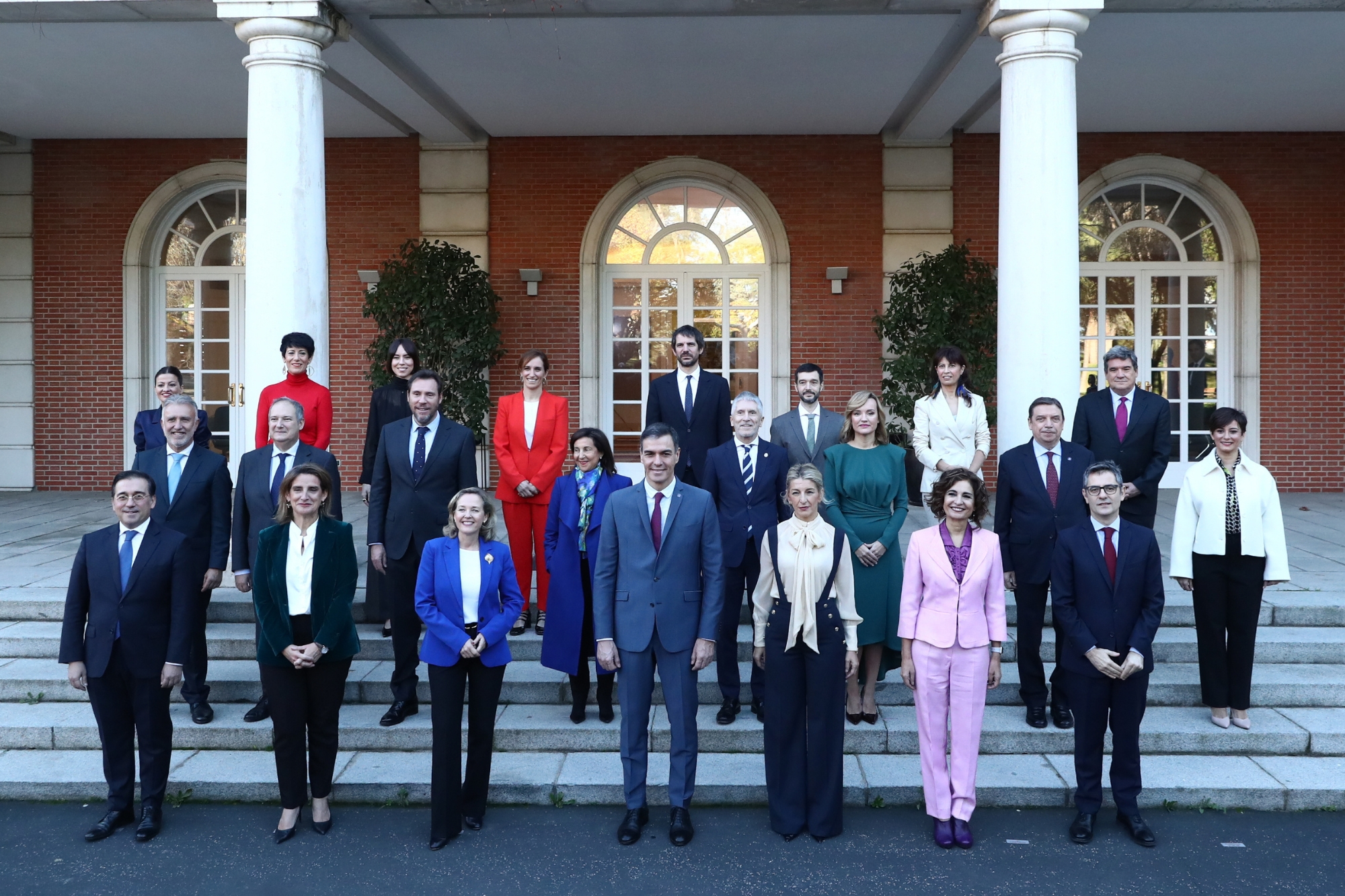
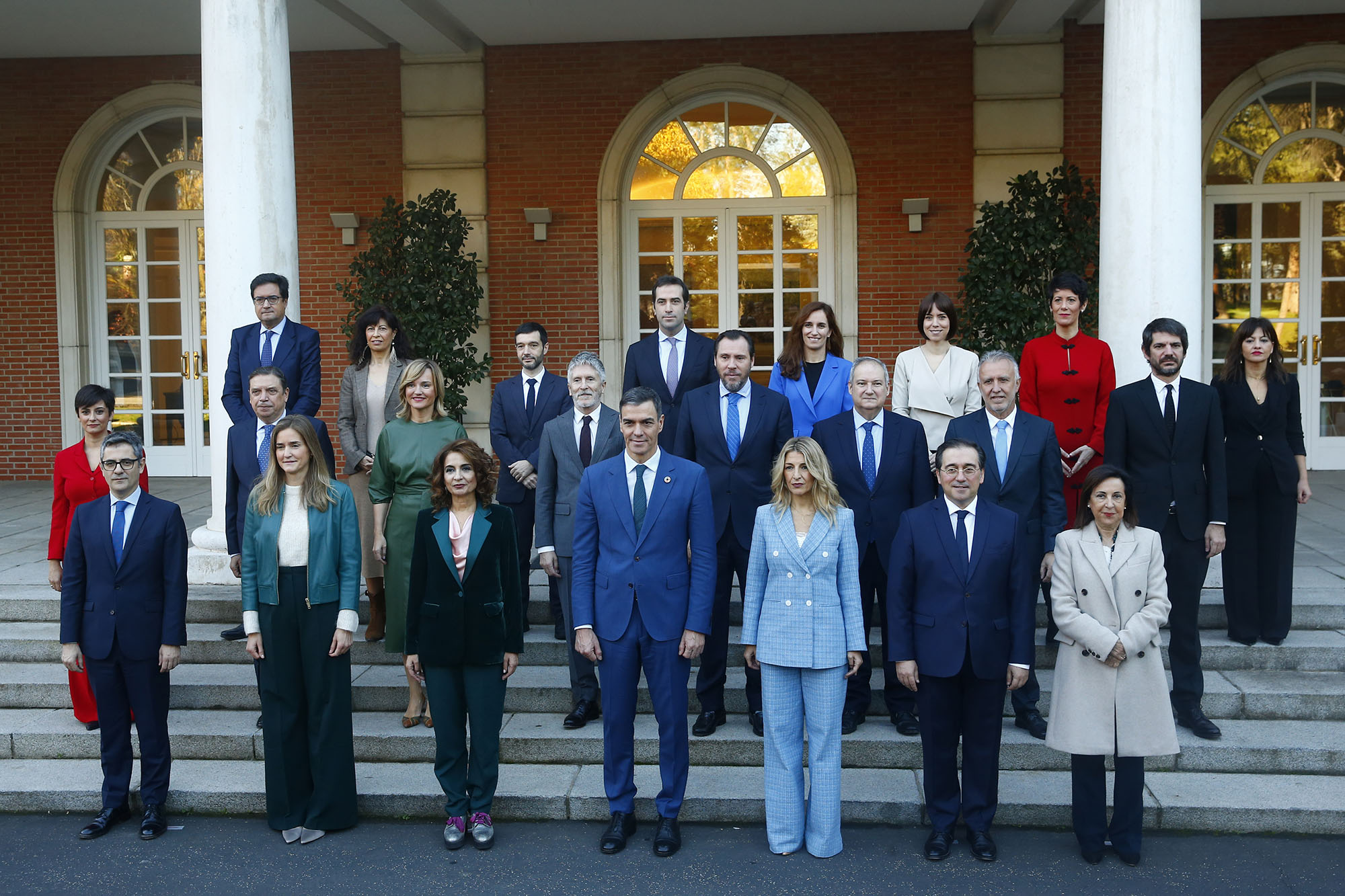
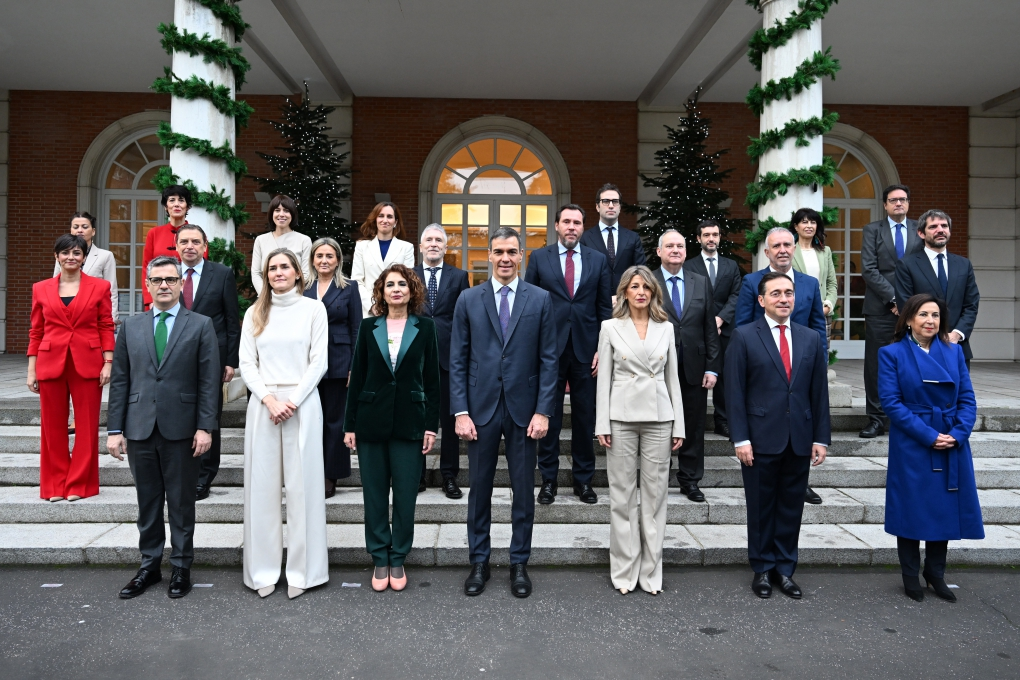
- The government in November 2023 (top left), November 2024 (top right) and December 2025 (bottom)
- Date formed: 21 November 2023

People and organisations
- Monarch: Felipe VI
- Prime Minister: Pedro Sánchez
- Deputy Prime Ministers: First: Nadia Calviño (2023); María Jesús Montero (2023–2026); Carlos Cuerpo (2026–present); Second: Yolanda Díaz; Third: Teresa Ribera (2023–2024); Sara Aagesen (2024–present); Fourth: María Jesús Montero (2023)
- No. of ministers: 22 (Note: Does not include the prime minister.)
- Total no. of members: 27
- Member parties: PSOE; Sumar
- Status in legislature: Minority (coalition)
- Opposition party: PP
- Opposition leader: Alberto Núñez Feijóo

History
- Incoming formation: 2023 government formation
- Election: 2023 general election
- Legislature term: 15th Cortes Generales
- Predecessor: Sánchez II

The third government of Pedro Sánchez was formed on 21 November 2023, following the latter's election as prime minister of Spain by the Congress of Deputies on 16 November and his swearing-in on 17 November, as a result of the Spanish Socialist Workers' Party (PSOE) and Sumar being able to muster a majority of seats in the Parliament with external support from Republican Left of Catalonia (ERC), Together for Catalonia (Junts), EH Bildu, the Basque Nationalist Party (PNV), the Galician Nationalist Bloc (BNG) and Canarian Coalition (CCa) following the 2023 general election. It succeeded the second Sánchez government and has been the incumbent government of Spain since 21 November 2023, a total of 1,093 days, or 2 years, 11 months and 28 days.

The cabinet comprises members of the PSOE (including its sister party, the Socialists' Party of Catalonia, PSC) and Sumar—with the involvement of Unite Movement (SMR), United Left (IU), the Communist Party of Spain (PCE), More Madrid (MM) and Catalonia in Common (Comuns)—as well as independents proposed by both parties.

== Investiture ==
Investiture; Congress of Deputies; Nomination of Pedro Sánchez (PSOE)
Ballot →	16 November 2023
Required majority →	176 out of 350
Yes: • PSOE (121); • Sumar (31); • ERC (7); • Junts (7); • EH Bildu (6); • PNV (5); • BNG (1); • CCa (1)	179 / 350
No: • PP (137); • Vox (33); • UPN (1)	171 / 350
Abstentions	0 / 350
Absentees	0 / 350

== Cabinet changes ==
Sánchez's third government saw a number of cabinet changes during its tenure:

- Following her election as president of the European Investment Bank on 8 December 2023, Nadia Calviño was expected to vacate her cabinet posts as first deputy prime minister and economy minister by the end of the year, in order to be able to take office at the EIB on 1 January 2024 following the end of Werner Hoyer's term. On 29 December, she was replaced as economy minister by until then-Secretary General for the Treasury and International Financing, Carlos Cuerpo, and as first deputy prime minister by Finance minister María Jesús Montero. The Finance and Digital Transformation ministries also saw changes in their structures, with civil service competences being transferred from the former to the latter.
- On 4 September 2024, Digital Transformation minister José Luis Escrivá was selected as new governor of the Bank of Spain, starting on 6 September, leading to a minor cabinet reshuffle which saw him replaced by Óscar López, until then Chief of Staff of the Prime Minister.
- On 25 November 2024, Sara Aagesen was appointed as new third deputy prime minister and as Ecological Transition and the Demographic Challenge ministry officeholder to replace Teresa Ribera, following the latter's selection to serve as first Executive Vice-President of the European Commission for Clean, Just and Competitive Transition and European Commissioner for Competitiveness in the second Von der Leyen Commission.
- On 22 December 2025, Pilar Alegría resigned as education minister and government spokesperson to run as the PSOE's candidate in the 2026 Aragonese regional election. She was replaced in the Education portfolio by former mayor of Toledo, Milagros Tolón, and as spokesperson by the Inclusion minister, Elma Saiz.
- On 27 March 2026, María Jesús Montero resigned as deputy prime minister and minister of Finance to run as her party's candidate in the 2026 Andalusian regional election, being replaced by Carlos Cuerpo as deputy prime minister and by Arcadi España in the Finance portfolio.
- On 4 November 2026, Óscar Puente resigned as minister of Transport and Sustainable Mobility following the Urda train accident, being replaced by deputy prime minister Carlos Cuerpo.

== Council of Ministers ==
The Council of Ministers is structured into the offices for the prime minister, the four deputy prime ministers, 22 ministries and the post of the spokesperson of the Government.

← Sánchez III Government → (21 November 2023 – present)
Portfolio	Name	Party	Took office	Left office	Ref.
Prime Minister	Pedro Sánchez	PSOE	17 November 2023	Incumbent	
First Deputy Prime Minister; Minister of Economy, Trade and Enterprise	Nadia Calviño	Independent	21 November 2023	29 December 2023	
Second Deputy Prime Minister; Minister of Labour and Social Economy	Yolanda Díaz	Sumar^{/MS}	21 November 2023	Incumbent	
Third Deputy Prime Minister; Minister for the Ecological Transition and the Demographic Challenge	Teresa Ribera	PSOE	21 November 2023	25 November 2024	
Fourth Deputy Prime Minister; Minister of Finance and Civil Service	María Jesús Montero	PSOE	21 November 2023	29 December 2023	
Minister of Foreign Affairs, European Union and Cooperation	José Manuel Albares	PSOE	21 November 2023	Incumbent	
Minister of the Presidency, Justice and Relations with the Cortes	Félix Bolaños	PSOE	21 November 2023	Incumbent	
Minister of Defence	Margarita Robles	Independent	21 November 2023	Incumbent	
Minister of the Interior	Fernando Grande-Marlaska	Independent	21 November 2023	Incumbent	
Minister of Transport and Sustainable Mobility	Óscar Puente	PSOE	21 November 2023	4 November 2026	
Minister of Education, Vocational Training and Sports; Spokesperson of the Government	Pilar Alegría	PSOE	21 November 2023	22 December 2025	
Minister of Industry and Tourism	Jordi Hereu	PSOE^{/PSC}	21 November 2023	Incumbent	
Minister of Agriculture, Fisheries and Food	Luis Planas	PSOE	21 November 2023	Incumbent	
Minister of Territorial Policy and Democratic Memory	Ángel Víctor Torres	PSOE	21 November 2023	Incumbent	
Minister of Housing and Urban Agenda	Isabel Rodríguez	PSOE	21 November 2023	Incumbent	
Minister of Culture	Ernest Urtasun	Sumar^{/Comuns}	21 November 2023	Incumbent	
Minister of Health	Mónica García	Sumar^{/MM}	21 November 2023	Incumbent	
Minister of Social Rights, Consumer Affairs and 2030 Agenda	Pablo Bustinduy	Independent	21 November 2023	Incumbent	
Minister of Science, Innovation and Universities	Diana Morant	PSOE	21 November 2023	Incumbent	
Minister of Equality	Ana Redondo	PSOE	21 November 2023	Incumbent	
Minister of Inclusion, Social Security and Migration	Elma Saiz	PSOE	21 November 2023	22 December 2025	
Minister of Digital Transformation	José Luis Escrivá	Independent	21 November 2023	29 December 2023	
Minister of Youth and Children	Sira Rego	Sumar^{/IU}	21 November 2023	Incumbent	
=== Changes December 2023 ===
Portfolio	Name	Party	Took office	Left office	Ref.
First Deputy Prime Minister (Note: On 29 December, following Nadia Calviño's election as president of the European Investment Bank, taking office on 1 January 2024, María Jesús Montero was promoted from fourth to first deputy prime minister, with the post of fourth deputy prime minister being discontinued. Concurrently, the ministries of Finance and Civil Service and Digital Transformation were reorganized as the Finance and Digital Transformation and Civil Service departments, respectively.); Minister of Finance	María Jesús Montero	PSOE	29 December 2023	27 March 2026	
~~Fourth Deputy Prime Minister~~	Discontinued on 29 December 2023 upon the officeholder's dismissal.				
Minister of Economy, Trade and Enterprise	Carlos Cuerpo	Independent	29 December 2023	27 March 2026	
Minister for the Digital Transformation and of the Civil Service	José Luis Escrivá	Independent	29 December 2023	6 September 2024	
=== Changes September 2024 ===
Portfolio	Name	Party	Took office	Left office	Ref.
Minister for the Digital Transformation and of the Civil Service	Óscar López	PSOE	6 September 2024	Incumbent	
=== Changes December 2024 ===
Portfolio	Name	Party	Took office	Left office	Ref.
Third Deputy Prime Minister; Minister for the Ecological Transition and the Demographic Challenge	Sara Aagesen	Independent	25 November 2024	Incumbent	
=== Changes December 2025 ===
Portfolio	Name	Party	Took office	Left office	Ref.
Minister of Education, Vocational Training and Sports	Milagros Tolón	PSOE	22 December 2025	Incumbent	
Minister of Inclusion, Social Security and Migration; Spokesperson of the Government	Elma Saiz	PSOE	22 December 2025	Incumbent	
=== Changes March 2026 ===
Portfolio	Name	Party	Took office	Left office	Ref.
First Deputy Prime Minister; Minister of Economy, Trade and Enterprise	Carlos Cuerpo	Independent	27 March 2026	Incumbent	
Minister of Finance	Arcadi España	PSOE	27 March 2026	Incumbent	
=== Changes November 2026 ===
Portfolio	Name	Party	Took office	Left office	Ref.
Minister of Transport and Sustainable Mobility	Carlos Cuerpo took on the ordinary discharge of duties from 4 November 2026.				

== Departmental structure ==
Pedro Sánchez's third government is organised into several superior and governing units, whose number, powers and hierarchical structure may vary depending on the ministerial department.

Unit/body rank

- (■) Secretary of state
- (■) Undersecretary
- (■) Director-general
- (●) Autonomous agency
- (◆) Military & intelligence agency

Office (Original name)	Portrait	Name	Took office	Left office	Alliance/party	Ref.
=== Prime Minister's Office ===
Prime Minister (Presidencia del Gobierno)		Pedro Sánchez	17 November 2023	Incumbent	PSOE	
Prime Minister (Presidencia del Gobierno)	28 November 2023 – 24 September 2024: (■) Cabinet of the Prime Minister's Office–Chief of Staff; (■) General Secretariat of the Prime Minister's Office; (■) Department of Technical and Legal Coordination; (■) Department of Protocol; (■) Department of Security; (■) Deputy Chief of Staff; (■) Department of Speech and Message; (■) Department of Territorial Monitoring and Analysis; (■) Department of Institutional Affairs; (■) General Secretariat of Political Planning; (■) General Secretariat of Public Policies, European Affairs and Strategic Foresight; (■) Department of Public Policies; (■) Department of European Affairs; (■) National Office for Foresight and Strategy; (■) General Secretariat of Foreign Affairs; (■) Coordination Office for the Spanish Presidency of the European Union (disest. 31 Mar 2024); (■) Department of Homeland Security; (■) Department of Cultural Affairs (est. 9 Feb 2024); (■) Office for Economic Affairs and G20; (■) Department of Strategic Projects and Sector Policies; (■) State Secretariat for Press; (■) Department of National Information; (■) Department of International Information; (■) Department of Regional Information; (■) Digital Department; (■) Department of Information Coordination; (■) Department of Institutional Coordination; 24 September 2024 – 29 July 2025: (■) Cabinet of the Prime Minister's Office–Chief of Staff; (■) Deputy Chief of Staff; (■) General Secretariat of the Prime Minister's Office; (■) Department of Technical and Legal Coordination; (■) Department of Protocol; (■) Department of Security; (■) General Secretariat for National Policy; (■) Department of Public Policies; (■) Department of Territorial Analysis; (■) Department of Cultural Affairs; (■) General Secretariat for Foreign Affairs; (■) Department of Foreign Affairs; (■) General Secretariat for Institutional Coordination; (■) Department of Political Coordination; (■) Department of Citizen Attention and Response; (■) Department of Institutional Affairs; (■) Department of National Security; (■) Department of European Affairs; (■) National Office for Foresight and Strategy; (■) Department of Speech; (■) Office for Economic Affairs and G20; (■) Department of Strategic Projects and Sector Policies; (■) State Secretariat for Press; (■) Department of National Information; (■) Department of International Information; (■) Department of Regional Information; (■) Digital Department; (■) Department of Information Coordination; (■) Department of Institutional Coordination; 29 July 2025 – present: (■) Cabinet of the Prime Minister's Office–Chief of Staff; (■) Deputy Chief of Staff; (■) Department of National Security; (■) Department of Strategic Foresight and Scientific Consulting; (■) Department of Cultural Affairs; (■) Department of Speech; (■) General Secretariat of the Prime Minister's Office; (■) Department of Technical and Legal Coordination; (■) Department of Protocol; (■) Department of Security; (■) General Secretariat for National Policy; (■) Department of Public Policies; (■) Department of Territorial Analysis; (■) Department of Political and Social Innovation; (■) Department of Political Coordination (disest. 26 Jan 2026); (■) Department of Strategic Studies (est. 26 Jan 2026); (■) General Secretariat for Foreign Affairs; (■) Department of Foreign Affairs; (■) General Secretariat for Institutional Relations and Citizenship; (■) Department of Institutional Affairs; (■) Department of European Affairs; (■) Office for Economic Affairs and G20; (■) Department of Strategic Projects and Sector Policies; (■) State Secretariat for Press; (■) Department of National Information; (■) Department of International Information; (■) Department of Regional Information; (■) Digital Department; (■) Department of Information Coordination; (■) Department of Institutional Coordination					
First Deputy Prime Minister (Vicepresidencia Primera del Gobierno)		Nadia Calviño	21 November 2023	29 December 2023	PSOE (Independent)	
First Deputy Prime Minister (Vicepresidencia Primera del Gobierno)		María Jesús Montero	29 December 2023	27 March 2026	PSOE	
First Deputy Prime Minister (Vicepresidencia Primera del Gobierno)		Carlos Cuerpo	27 March 2026	Incumbent	PSOE (Independent)	
First Deputy Prime Minister (Vicepresidencia Primera del Gobierno)	See Ministry of Economy, Trade and Enterprise (21 November – 29 December 2023; 27 March 2026 – present); See Ministry of Finance (29 December 2023 – 27 March 2026)					
Second Deputy Prime Minister (Vicepresidencia Segunda del Gobierno)		Yolanda Díaz	21 November 2023	Incumbent	Sumar (MS, PCE)	
Second Deputy Prime Minister (Vicepresidencia Segunda del Gobierno)	See Ministry of Labour and Social Economy					
Third Deputy Prime Minister (Vicepresidencia Tercera del Gobierno)		Teresa Ribera	21 November 2023	25 November 2024	PSOE	
Third Deputy Prime Minister (Vicepresidencia Tercera del Gobierno)		Sara Aagesen	25 November 2024	Incumbent	PSOE (Independent)	
Third Deputy Prime Minister (Vicepresidencia Tercera del Gobierno)	See Ministry for the Ecological Transition and the Demographic Challenge					
Fourth Deputy Prime Minister (Vicepresidencia Cuarta del Gobierno) (until 29 December 2023)		María Jesús Montero	21 November 2023	29 December 2023	PSOE	
Fourth Deputy Prime Minister (Vicepresidencia Cuarta del Gobierno) (until 29 December 2023)	See #Ministry of Finance					
=== Ministry of Foreign Affairs, European Union and Cooperation ===
Ministry of Foreign Affairs, European Union and Cooperation (Ministerio de Asuntos Exteriores, Unión Europea y Cooperación)		José Manuel Albares	21 November 2023	Incumbent	PSOE	
Ministry of Foreign Affairs, European Union and Cooperation (Ministerio de Asuntos Exteriores, Unión Europea y Cooperación)	6 December 2023 – present: (■) State Secretariat for Foreign and Global Affairs; (■) Directorate-General for Foreign Policy and Security; (■) Directorate-General for the United Nations, International Organizations and Human Rights; (■) Directorate-General for the Maghreb, the Mediterranean and the Middle East; (■) Directorate-General for Africa; (■) Directorate-General for North America, Eastern Europe, Asia and the Pacific; (■) State Secretariat for the European Union; (■) General Secretariat for the European Union; (■) Directorate-General for Integration and Coordination of General Affairs of the European Union; (■) Directorate-General for Coordination of the Internal Market and other European Union Policies; (■) Directorate-General for Western, Central and South East Europe; (■) State Secretariat for Ibero-America and the Caribbean and the Spanish in the World; (■) Directorate-General for Ibero-America and the Caribbean; (■) Directorate-General for the Spanish in the World; (■) State Secretariat for International Cooperation; (■) Directorate-General for Sustainable Development Policies; (■) Undersecretariat of Foreign Affairs, European Union and Cooperation; (■) Technical General Secretariat; (■) Directorate-General for the Foreign Service; (■) Directorate-General for Spaniards Abroad and Consular Affairs; (■) Directorate-General for Protocol, Chancery and Orders; (■) Directorate-General for Communication, Public Diplomacy and Media; (■) Directorate-General for Economic Diplomacy					
=== Ministry of the Presidency, Justice and Relations with the Cortes ===
Ministry of the Presidency, Justice and Relations with the Cortes (Ministerio de la Presidencia, Justicia y Relaciones con las Cortes)		Félix Bolaños	21 November 2023	Incumbent	PSOE	
Ministry of the Presidency, Justice and Relations with the Cortes (Ministerio de la Presidencia, Justicia y Relaciones con las Cortes)	6 December 2023 – present: (■) State Secretariat for Justice; (■) General Secretariat for Innovation and Quality of the Public Justice Service; (■) Directorate-General for the Public Justice Service; (■) Directorate-General for Digital Transformation of the Administration of Justice; (■) Directorate-General for Legal Security and Public Faith; (■) Directorate-General for International Legal Cooperation and Human Rights (until 28 Feb 2024) / Directorate-General for International Legal Cooperation (from 28 Feb 2024); (■) State Secretariat for Relations with the Cortes and Constitutional Affairs; (■) Directorate-General for Relations with the Cortes; (■) Directorate-General for Constitutional Affairs and Legal Coordination; (■) Undersecretariat of the Presidency, Justice and Relations with the Cortes; (■) Technical General Secretariat–Government Secretariat; (■) Directorate-General for Services; (■) Directorate-General for Religious Freedom (est. 28 Feb 2024); (■) Office of the Solicitor General of the State; (■) Directorate-General for Consultation; (■) Directorate-General for Litigation					
=== Ministry of Defence ===
Ministry of Defence (Ministerio de Defensa)		Margarita Robles	21 November 2023	Incumbent	PSOE (Independent)	
Ministry of Defence (Ministerio de Defensa)	6 December 2023 – present: (■) State Secretariat for Defence; (■) Directorate-General for Strategy and Innovation of the Defence Industry (est. 12 Sep 2024); (■) Directorate-General for Armament and Materiel; (■) Directorate-General for Economic Affairs; (■) Directorate-General for Infrastructure; (■) Information and Communication Systems and Technologies Centre; (■) Undersecretariat of Defence; (■) Technical General Secretariat; (■) Directorate-General for Personnel; (■) Directorate-General for Military Recruitment and Teaching; (■) General Secretariat for Defence Policy; (■) Directorate-General for Defence Policy; (◆) Armed Forces; (■) Defence Staff–Chief of the Defence Staff; (■) Army–Chief of Staff of the Army; (■) Navy–Chief of Staff of the Navy; (■) Air Force–Chief of Staff of the Air Force; (◆) National Intelligence Centre; (■) State Secretariat–Directorate of the National Intelligence Centre; (■) General Secretariat of the National Intelligence Centre; (■) Technical Directorate for Resources; (■) Technical Directorate for Intelligence; (■) Technical Directorate for Intelligence Support					
=== Ministry of Finance ===
Ministry of Finance and Civil Service (Ministerio de Hacienda y Función Pública) (until 29 December 2023) Ministry of Finance (Ministerio de Hacienda) (from 29 December 2023)		María Jesús Montero	21 November 2023	27 March 2026	PSOE	
Ministry of Finance and Civil Service (Ministerio de Hacienda y Función Pública) (until 29 December 2023) Ministry of Finance (Ministerio de Hacienda) (from 29 December 2023)		Arcadi España	27 March 2026	Incumbent	PSOE	
Ministry of Finance and Civil Service (Ministerio de Hacienda y Función Pública) (until 29 December 2023) Ministry of Finance (Ministerio de Hacienda) (from 29 December 2023)	6–29 December 2023: (■) State Secretariat for Finance; (■) General Secretariat for Regional and Local Financing; (■) Directorate-General for Budgetary Stability and Territorial Financial Management; (■) Directorate-General for Taxes; (■) Directorate-General for the Cadastre; (■) Central Economic-Administrative Court; (■) State Secretariat for Budgets and Expenditure; (■) Office of the Comptroller General of the State Administration; (■) Directorate-General for Budgets; (■) Directorate-General for Personnel Costs; (■) State Secretariat for the Civil Service; (■) Directorate-General for the Civil Service; (■) Directorate-General for Citizenry and Open Government; (■) Office for Conflicts of Interest; (■) Undersecretariat of Finance and Civil Service; (■) Technical General Secretariat; (■) Directorate-General for the State Heritage; (■) Inspectorate-General; (■) Directorate-General for Rationalization and Centralization of Contracting; (■) General Secretariat for European Funds; (■) Directorate-General for European Funds; (■) Directorate-General for the Recovery and Resilience Plan and Mechanism; 29 December 2023 – present: (■) State Secretariat for Finance; (■) General Secretariat for Regional and Local Financing; (■) Directorate-General for Budgetary Stability and Territorial Financial Management; (■) Directorate-General for Taxes; (■) Directorate-General for the Cadastre; (■) Central Economic-Administrative Court; (■) State Secretariat for Budgets and Expenditure; (■) Office of the Comptroller General of the State Administration; (■) Directorate-General for Budgets; (■) Directorate-General for Personnel Costs; (■) Undersecretariat of Finance; (■) Technical General Secretariat; (■) Directorate-General for the State Heritage; (■) Inspectorate-General; (■) Directorate-General for Rationalization and Centralization of Contracting; (■) General Secretariat for European Funds; (■) Directorate-General for European Funds; (■) Directorate-General for the Recovery and Resilience Plan and Mechanism					
=== Ministry of the Interior ===
Ministry of the Interior (Ministerio del Interior)		Fernando Grande-Marlaska	21 November 2023	Incumbent	PSOE (Independent)	
Ministry of the Interior (Ministerio del Interior)	6 December 2023 – present: (■) State Secretariat for Security; (■) Directorate-General of the Police; (■) Directorate-General of the Civil Guard; (■) Directorate-General for International Relations and Foreigners; (■) Directorate-General for Coordination and Studies; (■) General Secretariat for Penitentiary Institutions; (■) Directorate-General for Criminal Enforcement and Social Reintegration; (■) General Secretariat for Civil Protection and Emergencies (est. 22 Apr 2026); (■) Directorate-General for Civil Protection and Emergencies; (■) Undersecretariat of the Interior; (■) Technical General Secretariat; (■) Directorate-General for International Protection; (■) Directorate-General for Traffic; (■) Directorate-General for Support to Victims of Terrorism; (■) Directorate-General for Internal Policy					
=== Ministry of Transport and Sustainable Mobility ===
Ministry of Transport and Sustainable Mobility (Ministerio de Transportes y Movilidad Sostenible)		Óscar Puente	21 November 2023	4 November 2026 (resigned)	PSOE	
Ministry of Transport and Sustainable Mobility (Ministerio de Transportes y Movilidad Sostenible)		Carlos Cuerpo (ordinary discharge of duties)	4 November 2026	Incumbent	PSOE (Independent)	
Ministry of Transport and Sustainable Mobility (Ministerio de Transportes y Movilidad Sostenible)	6 December 2023 – present: (■) State Secretariat for Transport and Sustainable Mobility; (■) General Secretariat for Land Transport; (■) Directorate-General for Roads; (■) Directorate-General for the Railway Sector; (■) Directorate-General for Road Transport (until 13 Mar 2024) / Directorate-General for Road and Rail Transport (from 13 Mar 2024); (■) General Secretariat for Air and Maritime Transport; (■) Directorate-General for Civil Aviation; (■) Directorate-General for the Merchant Marine; (■) General Secretariat for Sustainable Mobility (est. 13 Mar 2024); (■) Directorate-General for Mobility Strategies (est. 13 Mar 2024); (■) Undersecretariat of Transport and Sustainable Mobility; (■) Technical General Secretariat; (■) Directorate-General for Economic Programming and Budgets; (■) Directorate-General for Organization and Inspection; (■) Directorate-General for the National Geographic Institute; (■) Special Commissioner for Transport and Sustainable Mobility					
=== Ministry of Education, Vocational Training and Sports ===
Ministry of Education, Vocational Training and Sports (Ministerio de Educación, Formación Profesional y Deportes)		Pilar Alegría	21 November 2023	22 December 2025	PSOE	
Ministry of Education, Vocational Training and Sports (Ministerio de Educación, Formación Profesional y Deportes)		Milagros Tolón	22 December 2025	Incumbent	PSOE	
Ministry of Education, Vocational Training and Sports (Ministerio de Educación, Formación Profesional y Deportes)	6 December 2023 – present: (■) State Secretariat for Education; (■) Directorate-General for Evaluation and Territorial Cooperation; (■) Directorate-General for Educational Planning and Management; (■) General Secretariat for Vocational Training; (■) Directorate-General for Vocational Training Planning, Innovation and Management; (■) Undersecretariat of Education, Vocational Training and Sports; (■) Technical General Secretariat; (●) High Council for Sports; (■) President's Office of the High Council for Sports; (■) Directorate-General for Sports					
=== Ministry of Labour and Social Economy ===
Ministry of Labour and Social Economy (Ministerio de Trabajo y Economía Social)		Yolanda Díaz	21 November 2023	Incumbent	Sumar (MS, PCE)	
Ministry of Labour and Social Economy (Ministerio de Trabajo y Economía Social)	6 December 2023 – present: (■) State Secretariat for Labour; (■) Directorate-General for Labour; (■) Directorate-General for Self-Employment; (■) Directorate-General for New Forms of Employment; (■) State Secretariat for Social Economy; (■) Special Commissioner for Social Economy; (■) Directorate-General for the Social Economy and Corporate Social Responsibility; (■) Undersecretariat of Labour and Social Economy; (■) Technical General Secretariat					
=== Ministry of Industry and Tourism ===
Ministry of Industry and Tourism (Ministerio de Industria y Turismo)		Jordi Hereu	21 November 2023	Incumbent	PSOE (PSC–PSOE)	
Ministry of Industry and Tourism (Ministerio de Industria y Turismo)	6 December 2023 – present: (■) State Secretariat for Industry; (■) Special Commissioner for the Agri-food SPERT (disest. 16 Jul 2025); (■) Special Commissioner for the Industrial Decarbonization SPERT (disest. 16 Jul 2025); (■) Special Commissioner for the Development of an Ecosystem for the Manufacture of the Electric and Connected Vehicle SPERT (disest. 25 Apr 2024); (■) Special Commissioner for Reindustrialization (est. 16 Jul 2025); (■) Special Commissioner for Industrial Competitiveness and Small and Medium-Sized Enterprises (est. 16 Jul 2025); (■) Directorate-General for Industrial Strategy and Small and Medium-sized Enterprises; (■) Directorate-General for Industrial Programs; (■) State Secretariat for Tourism; (■) Directorate-General for Tourism Policies (est. 25 Apr 2024); (■) Undersecretariat of Industry and Tourism; (■) Technical General Secretariat					
=== Ministry of Agriculture, Fisheries and Food ===
Ministry of Agriculture, Fisheries and Food (Ministerio de Agricultura, Pesca y Alimentación)		Luis Planas	21 November 2023	Incumbent	PSOE	
Ministry of Agriculture, Fisheries and Food (Ministerio de Agricultura, Pesca y Alimentación)	6 December 2023 – present: (■) State Secretariat for Agriculture and Food; (■) Directorate General for Rural Development, Innovation and Agrifood Training; (■) General Secretariat for Agrarian Resources and Food Security; (■) Directorate-General for Agricultural Production and Markets; (■) Directorate-General for Health of Agricultural Production and Animal Welfare; (■) Directorate-General for Food; (■) General Secretariat for Fisheries; (■) Directorate-General for Sustainable Fisheries; (■) Directorate-General for Fisheries Management and Aquaculture; (■) Undersecretariat of Agriculture, Fisheries and Food; (■) Technical General Secretariat; (■) Directorate-General for Services and Inspection					
=== Ministry of Territorial Policy and Democratic Memory ===
Ministry of Territorial Policy and Democratic Memory (Ministerio de Política Territorial y Memoria Democrática)		Ángel Víctor Torres	21 November 2023	Incumbent	PSOE	
Ministry of Territorial Policy and Democratic Memory (Ministerio de Política Territorial y Memoria Democrática)	6 December 2023 – present: (■) State Secretariat for Territorial Policy; (■) General Secretariat for Territorial Coordination; (■) Directorate-General for Regional and Local Cooperation; (■) Directorate-General for Regional and Local Legal Regime; (■) Directorate-General of the General State Administration in the Territory; (■) State Secretariat for Democratic Memory; (■) Directorate-General for Victim Attention and Democratic Memory Promotion (disest. 29 Nov 2024); (■) Directorate-General for Victim Attention (est. 29 Nov 2024); (■) Directorate-General for Democratic Memory Promotion (est. 29 Nov 2024); (■) Undersecretariat of Territorial Policy and Democratic Memory; (■) Technical General Secretariat; (■) Special Commissioner for the Reconstruction of the island of La Palma					
=== Ministry for the Ecological Transition and the Demographic Challenge ===
Ministry for the Ecological; Transition and the Demographic; Challenge (Ministerio para la Transición; Ecológica y el Reto Demográfico)		Teresa Ribera	21 November 2023	25 November 2024	PSOE	
Ministry for the Ecological; Transition and the Demographic; Challenge (Ministerio para la Transición; Ecológica y el Reto Demográfico)		Sara Aagesen	25 November 2024	Incumbent	PSOE (Independent)	
Ministry for the Ecological; Transition and the Demographic; Challenge (Ministerio para la Transición; Ecológica y el Reto Demográfico)	6 December 2023 – present: (■) State Secretariat for Energy; (■) Directorate-General for Energy Policy and Mines; (■) Directorate-General for Energy Planning and Coordination; (■) State Secretariat for Environment; (■) Directorate-General for Water; (■) Spanish Office for Climate Change; (■) Directorate-General for Environmental Quality and Evaluation; (■) Directorate-General for the Coast and the Sea; (■) Directorate-General for Biodiversity, Forests and Desertification; (■) General Secretariat for the Demographic Challenge; (■) Directorate-General for Policies against Depopulation; (■) Undersecretariat for the Ecological Transition and the Demographic Challenge; (■) Technical General Secretariat; (■) Directorate-General for Services; (■) Commissioner for Renewable Energy, Hydrogen and Storage; (■) Commissioner for the Water Cycle and Ecosystem Restoration; (■) Commissioner for the Circular Economy					
=== Ministry of Housing and Urban Agenda ===
Ministry of Housing and Urban Agenda (Ministerio de Vivienda y Agenda Urbana)		Isabel Rodríguez	21 November 2023	Incumbent	PSOE	
Ministry of Housing and Urban Agenda (Ministerio de Vivienda y Agenda Urbana)	6 December 2023 – present: (■) State Secretariat for Urban Agenda (until 6 Dec 2023) / State Secretariat for Housing and Urban Agenda (from 6 Dec 2023); (■) General Secretariat for Urban Agenda, Housing and Architecture; (■) Directorate-General for Urban Agenda and Architecture; (■) Directorate-General for Housing and Soil; (■) Directorate-General for Planning and Evaluation (from 29 Feb 2024); (■) Directorate-General for Planning and Institutional Relations (until 29 Feb 2024); (■) Undersecretariat of Housing and Urban Agenda; (■) Technical General Secretariat					
=== Ministry of Culture ===
Ministry of Culture (Ministerio de Cultura)		Ernest Urtasun	21 November 2023	Incumbent	Sumar (Comuns)	
Ministry of Culture (Ministerio de Cultura)	6 December 2023 – present: (■) State Secretariat for Culture; (■) Directorate-General for Books, Comics and Reading; (■) Directorate-General for Cultural Industries, Intellectual Property and Cooperation (until 27 Mar 2024) / Directorate-General for Cultural Rights (from 27 Mar 2024); (■) Directorate-General for Cultural Heritage and Fine Arts; (■) Undersecretariat of Culture; (■) Technical General Secretariat					
=== Ministry of Economy, Trade and Enterprise ===
Ministry of Economy, Trade and Enterprise (Ministerio de Economía, Comercio y Empresa)		Nadia Calviño	21 November 2023	29 December 2023	PSOE (Independent)	
Ministry of Economy, Trade and Enterprise (Ministerio de Economía, Comercio y Empresa)		Carlos Cuerpo	29 December 2023	Incumbent	PSOE (Independent)	
Ministry of Economy, Trade and Enterprise (Ministerio de Economía, Comercio y Empresa)	6 December 2023 – present: (■) State Secretariat for Economy and Enterprise Support; (■) General Secretariat for the Treasury and International Financing; (■) Directorate-General for the Treasury and Financial Policy; (■) Directorate-General for International Financing; (■) Directorate-General for Economic Policy; (■) Directorate-General for Macroeconomic Analysis (until 25 Apr 2024) / Directorate-General for Economic Analysis (from 25 Apr 2024); (■) Directorate-General for Insurance and Pension Funds; (■) State Secretariat for Trade; (■) Directorate-General for International Trade and Investments; (■) Directorate-General for Trade Policy; (■) Special Commissioner for the Alliance for the New Economy of Language (disest. 28 Feb 2024); (■) Undersecretariat of Economy, Trade and Enterprise; (■) Technical General Secretariat					
=== Ministry of Health ===
Ministry of Health (Ministerio de Sanidad)		Mónica García	21 November 2023	Incumbent	Sumar (MM)	
Ministry of Health (Ministerio de Sanidad)	6 December 2023 – present: (■) State Secretariat for Health; (■) General Secretariat for Digital Health, Information and Innovation of the National Health System; (■) Directorate-General for Digital Health and Information Systems for the National Health System; (■) Directorate-General for Public Health and Health Equity; (■) Directorate-General for the Common Catalogue of Services of the National Health System and Pharmacy; (■) Directorate-General for Professional Management; (■) Government Delegation for the National Plan on Drugs; (■) Undersecretariat of Health; (■) Technical General Secretariat; (■) Commissioner for Mental Health					
=== Ministry of Social Rights, Consumer Affairs and 2030 Agenda ===
Ministry of Social Rights, Consumer; Affairs and 2030 Agenda (Ministerio de Derechos Sociales, Consumo y Agenda 2030)		Pablo Bustinduy	21 November 2023	Incumbent	Sumar (Independent)	
Ministry of Social Rights, Consumer; Affairs and 2030 Agenda (Ministerio de Derechos Sociales, Consumo y Agenda 2030)	6 December 2023 – present: (■) State Secretariat for Social Rights and 2030 Agenda (until 29 Dec 2023) / State Secretariat for Social Rights (from 29 Dec 2023); (■) Directorate-General for the Rights of Persons with Disabilities; (■) Directorate-General for Family Diversity and Social Services; (■) Directorate-General for Animal Rights; (■) General Secretariat for Consumer Affairs and Gambling; (■) Directorate-General for Consumer Affairs; (■) Directorate-General for Gambling Management; (■) Undersecretariat of Social Rights, Consumer Affairs and 2030 Agenda; (■) Technical General Secretariat; (■) Directorate-General for the 2030 Agenda					
=== Ministry of Science, Innovation and Universities ===
Ministry of Science, Innovation and Universities (Ministerio de Ciencia, Innovación y Universidades)		Diana Morant	21 November 2023	Incumbent	PSOE	
Ministry of Science, Innovation and Universities (Ministerio de Ciencia, Innovación y Universidades)	6 December 2023 – present: (■) State Secretariat for Science, Innovation and Universities; (■) General Secretariat for Research; (■) General Secretariat for Universities; (■) General Secretariat for Innovation; (■) SPERT Commissioner for Cutting-Edge Health (est. 21 Dec 2023); (■) Directorate-General for Planning, Coordination and Transfer of Knowledge; (■) Undersecretariat of Science, Innovation and Universities; (■) Technical General Secretariat					
=== Ministry of Equality ===
Ministry of Equality (Ministerio de Igualdad)		Ana Redondo	21 November 2023	Incumbent	PSOE	
Ministry of Equality (Ministerio de Igualdad)	6 December 2023 – present: (■) State Secretariat for Equality and against Gender Violence (until 29 Dec 2023) / State Secretariat for Equality and for the Eradication of Violence against Women (from 29 Dec 2023); (■) Government Delegation against Gender Violence; (■) Directorate-General for Equal Treatment and Non-Discrimination and against Racism; (■) Directorate-General for Real and Effective Equality of LGTBI+ People; (■) Undersecretariat of Equality; (■) Technical General Secretariat					
=== Ministry of Inclusion, Social Security and Migration ===
Ministry of Inclusion, Social Security and Migration (Ministerio de Inclusión, Seguridad Social y Migraciones)		Elma Saiz	21 November 2023	Incumbent	PSOE	
Ministry of Inclusion, Social Security and Migration (Ministerio de Inclusión, Seguridad Social y Migraciones)	6 December 2023 – present: (■) State Secretariat for Social Security and Pensions; (■) Directorate-General for Social Security Management; (■) Office of the Comptroller General of the Social Security; (■) State Secretariat for Migration; (■) Directorate-General for Migration (until 23 May 2024) / Directorate-General for Migration Management (from 23 May 2024); (■) Directorate-General for Humanitarian Attention and the International Protection Reception System; (■) Directorate-General for Spanish Citizenry Abroad and Return Policies; (■) General Secretariat for Inclusion; (■) Undersecretariat of Inclusion, Social Security and Migration; (■) Technical General Secretariat					
=== Ministry of Digital Transformation ===
Ministry of Digital Transformation (Ministerio de Transformación Digital) (until 29 December 2023) Ministry for the Digital Transformation and of the Civil Service (Ministerio para la Transformación Digital y de la Función Pública) (from 29 December 2023)		José Luis Escrivá	21 November 2023	6 September 2024	PSOE (Independent)	
Ministry of Digital Transformation (Ministerio de Transformación Digital) (until 29 December 2023) Ministry for the Digital Transformation and of the Civil Service (Ministerio para la Transformación Digital y de la Función Pública) (from 29 December 2023)		Óscar López	6 September 2024	Incumbent	PSOE	
Ministry of Digital Transformation (Ministerio de Transformación Digital) (until 29 December 2023) Ministry for the Digital Transformation and of the Civil Service (Ministerio para la Transformación Digital y de la Función Pública) (from 29 December 2023)	6–29 December 2023: (■) State Secretariat for Digitalization and Artificial Intelligence; (■) Directorate-General for Digitalization and Artificial Intelligence; (■) State Secretariat for Telecommunications and Digital Infrastructure; (■) General Secretariat for Telecommunications and Management of the Audiovisual Communication Services; (■) Undersecretariat of Digital Transformation; (■) Technical General Secretariat; (■) General Secretariat for Digital Administration; (■) Special Commissioner for the Alliance for the New Economy of Language; (■) Office of the Special Commissioner for the Alliance for the New Economy of Language; 29 December 2023 – 28 February 2024: (■) State Secretariat for Digitalization and Artificial Intelligence; (■) Directorate-General for Digitalization and Artificial Intelligence; (■) State Secretariat for Telecommunications and Digital Infrastructure; (■) General Secretariat for Telecommunications and Management of the Audiovisual Communication Services; (■) State Secretariat for the Civil Service; (■) Directorate-General for the Civil Service; (■) Directorate-General for Citizenry and Open Government; (■) Office for Conflicts of Interest; (■) Undersecretariat for the Digital Transformation and of the Civil Service; (■) Technical General Secretariat; (■) General Secretariat for Digital Administration; (■) Special Commissioner for the Alliance for the New Economy of Language; (■) Office of the Special Commissioner for the Alliance for the New Economy of Language; 28 February 2024 – 29 November 2024: (■) State Secretariat for Digitalization and Artificial Intelligence; (■) Directorate-General for Digitalization and Artificial Intelligence; (■) Directorate-General for Data; (■) Directorate-General for Strategic Planning in Advanced Digital Technologies and New Language Economy; (■) State Secretariat for Telecommunications and Digital Infrastructure; (■) General Secretariat for Telecommunications and Management of the Audiovisual Communication Services; (■) State Secretariat for the Civil Service; (■) General Secretariat for Digital Administration; (■) Directorate-General for the Civil Service; (■) Directorate-General for Public Governance; (■) Office for Conflicts of Interest; (■) Undersecretariat for the Digital Transformation and of the Civil Service; (■) Technical General Secretariat; 29 November 2024 – present: (■) State Secretariat for Digitalization and Artificial Intelligence; (■) Directorate-General for the Management of Digitalisation and Audiovisual Communication Services; (■) Directorate-General for Artificial Intelligence; (■) Directorate-General for Data; (■) State Secretariat for Telecommunications and Digital Infrastructure; (■) General Secretariat for Telecommunications, Digital Infrastructure and Digital Security; (■) State Secretariat for the Civil Service; (■) General Secretariat for Digital Administration (disest. 7 Nov 2024); (■) Directorate-General for the Civil Service; (■) Directorate-General for Public Governance; (■) Office for Conflicts of Interest; (■) Undersecretariat for the Digital Transformation and of the Civil Service; (■) Technical General Secretariat					
=== Ministry of Youth and Children ===
Ministry of Youth and Children (Ministerio de Juventud e Infancia)		Sira Rego	21 November 2023	Incumbent	Sumar (IU, PCE)	
Ministry of Youth and Children (Ministerio de Juventud e Infancia)	6 December 2023 – present: (■) State Secretariat for Youth and Children; (■) Directorate-General for Children and Adolescent Rights; (■) Undersecretariat of Youth and Children; (■) Technical General Secretariat					
=== Spokesperson of the Government ===
Spokesperson of the Government (Portavoz del Gobierno)		Pilar Alegría	21 November 2023	22 December 2025	PSOE	
Spokesperson of the Government (Portavoz del Gobierno)		Elma Saiz	22 December 2025	Incumbent	PSOE	

== Notes ==
Preceded by Sánchez II	Government of Spain; 2023–present	Incumbent
