= List of agencies in Spain =

Government agencies of Spain

In Spain, the legislative definition of agency is regulated in Law 40/2015, of October 1, on the Legal Regime of the Public Sector. Unlike other countries, in Spain only the executive branch has agencies and any need of any of the other branches is covered by the executive.

== Types of agencies ==
There is not a single definition of what is considered an agency in Spain because, on the one hand, there are three types of public agencies (Spanish: Organismos públicos, literally, public organisms, OP): Autonomous agencies (Spanish: Organismos autónomos, OA), public business entities (Spanish: Entidades públicas empresariales, EPE) and state agencies (Spanish: Agencias estatales, AE). But, in addition, there are also independent agencies (Spanish: Autoridades administrativas independientes, literally, independent administrative authorities, AAI).

As far as this article is concerned, public business entities (EPE) are going to be ruled out because, despite being considered public agencies according to legislation, their operation is more similar to that of a public company than to that of an agency itself and may be subordinate to an autonomous agency.

Of the other three types of agency, the main difference between them is the law that regulates them. OAs are governed by common administrative law, while AEs and AAIs are governed by their own creation laws. Autonomous agencies and state agencies have their own legal personality, their own treasury and assets, and autonomy in their management, while the AAIs have their own legal personality, their own assets, but they have independence in their management, not autonomy. The AAIs can be compared to the independent agencies of the United States, since they are independent of the executive branch insofar as they are regulated by their own special legislation that includes special mechanisms to ensure their independence, as is the limitation for the executive branch to appoint and dismiss the high officials of it, with greater control of the legislative branch.

Another important difference is the purpose for which they are created. The autonomous agencies (OA) carry out activities of the Public Administration, both activities of promotion, give benefits, management of public services or production of goods of public interest, as differentiated instrumental organizations and dependent on it. The state agencies (AE) are created to comply with specific policies, with better mechanisms to ensure better management and control of results. Finally, the AAIs are assigned external regulatory or supervisory functions over economic sectors or specific activities that require functional independence or special autonomy from the executive branch.

There is a fourth and exceptional category of agencies. These are the management entities and common services of the Social Security, regulated in the Social Security Act of 2015.

== Ministry of Foreign Affairs ==
=== Secretariat of State for International Cooperation ===
- Spanish Agency for International Development Cooperation (AECID)
- Instituto Cervantes

== Ministry of the Presidency, Justice and Relations with the Cortes ==
- Centre for Political and Constitutional Studies (CEPC)
- Centre for Sociological Research (CIS)
- Patrimonio Nacional

=== Secretariat of State for Justice ===
- Center for Legal Studies (CEJ)
- General Mutual Benefit Society for Civil Servants of the Administration of Justice (MUGEJU)

=== Undersecretariat of the Presidency ===
- Official State Gazette (BOE)

== Ministry of Defence ==
- National Intelligence Centre (CNI)
- Spanish Space Agency (AEE), which also depends on the Ministry of Science.

=== Secretariat of State for Defence ===
- National Institute for Aerospace Technology (INTA)
- Institute for Housing, Infrastructure and Equipment of the Defense (INVIED)

=== Undersecretariat of Defence ===
- Social Institute of the Armed Forces (ISFAS)

== Ministry of Finance ==
=== Secretariat of State for Finance ===
- Spanish Tax Agency (AEAT)
- Institute of Fiscal Studies (IEF)

=== Undersecretariat of Finance ===
- Commissioner for the Tobacco Market (CMT)
- Royal Mint of Spain (FNMT-RCM)
- State Vehicle Fleet (PME).

== Ministry of the Interior ==
=== Secretariat of State for Security ===
- State Security Infrastructure and Equipment Office (GIESE)

==== Directorate-General of the Police ====
- National Police Training University Center (CUFPN)

=== Undersecretariat of the Interior ===
- Central Traffic Headquarters (JCT)

== Ministry of Transport and Sustainable Mobility ==
=== Secretariat of State for Transport and Sustainable Mobility ===
- Centre for Public Works Studies and Experimentation (CEDEX)

=== General Secretariat for Land Transport ===
- Railway Safety Agency (AESF)

=== General Secretariat for Air and Maritime Transport ===
- Spanish Aviation Safety and Security Agency (AESA)

=== Undersecretariat of Transport and Sustainable Mobility ===
- National Geographic Information Centre (CNIG)

== Ministry of Education, Vocational Training and Sports ==
- National Sports Council (CSD)
  - Spanish Anti-Doping Agency (CELAD)

== Ministry of Labour and Social Economy ==
=== Secretariat of State for Labour ===
- Labour and Social Security Inspectorate (ITSS)
- Public State Service for Employment (SEPE)
- Salary Guarantee Fund (FOGASA)
- National Institute for Safety and Health at Work (INSST)

== Ministry of Industry and Tourism ==
=== Secretariat of State for Industry ===
- Spanish Metrology Centre (CEM)

=== Secretariat of State for Tourism ===
- Tourism Institute of Spain (TURESPAÑA)

=== Undersecretariat of Industry and Tourism ===
- Spanish Patent and Trademark Office (OEPM)

== Ministry of Agriculture, Fisheries and Food ==
=== General Secretariat for Agrarian Resources and Food Security ===
- Spanish Agricultural Guarantee Fund (FEGA)
- Food Information and Control Agency (AICA)

=== Undersecretariat of Agriculture, Fisheries and Food ===
- National Agency for Agricultural Insurance (ENESA)

== Ministry of Territorial Policy and Democratic Memory ==
This Department has no agencies attached.

== Ministry for the Ecological Transition and the Demographic Challenge ==
=== Secretariat of State for Energy ===
- Institute for Just Transition (ITJ)

=== Secretariat of State for Environment ===
- State Meteorological Agency (AEMET)
- National Parks Autonomous Agency (OAPN)

==== Directorate-General for Water ====
- Commonwealth of the Taibilla Channels (MCT)
- Cantabrian Hydrographic Confederation
- Duero Hydrographic Confederation
- Ebro Hydrographic Confederation
- Guadalquivir Hydrographic Confederation
- Guadiana Hydrographic Confederation
- Júcar Hydrographic Confederation
- Miño-Sil Hydrographic Confederation
- Segura Hydrographic Confederation
- Tajo Hydrographic Confederation

== Ministry of Culture ==
- Museo Nacional del Prado
- Museo Nacional Centro de Arte Reina Sofía
- Biblioteca Nacional de España (BNE)

=== Secretariat of State for Culture ===
- National Institute of Performing Arts and Music (INAEM)
- Institute of Cinematography and Audiovisual Arts (ICAA)
- Culture Infrastructure and Equipment Office (GIEC)

== Ministry of Economy, Trade and Business ==
=== Secretariat of State for Economy and Business Support ===
- National Statistics Institute (INE)
- Institute for Accounting and Accounts Audit (ICAC)

== Ministry of Health ==
=== Secretariat of State for Health ===
- Spanish Agency of Medicines and Medical Devices (AEMPS)
- National Institute of Health Management (INGESA)
- National Transplant Organization (ONT)

== Ministry of Social Rights, Consumer Affairs and 2030 Agenda ==
- Royal Board on Disability (RPD)

=== Secretariat of State for Social Rights ===
- Institute for the Elderly and Social Services (IMSERSO)
- Institute of Youth (INJUVE)

=== General Secretariat for Consumer Affairs and Gambling ===
- Spanish Agency for Food Safety and Nutrition (AESAN)

== Ministry of Science, Innovation and Universities ==
- Spanish Space Agency (AEE), which also depends on the Ministry of Defence.

=== General Secretariat for Research ===
- State Research Agency (AEI)
- Spanish National Research Council (CSIC)
- Carlos III Health Institute (ISCIII)
- Center for Energy, Environmental and Technological Research (CIEMAT)

=== General Secretariat for Universities ===
- Menéndez Pelayo International University (UIMP)
- National Agency for Quality Assessment and Accreditation (ANECA)
- Spanish Service for the Internationalization of Education (SEPIE)

== Ministry of Equality ==
=== Secretariat of State for Equality and against Gender Violence ===
- Institute of Women

== Ministry of Inclusion, Social Security and Migration ==
=== Secretariat of State for Social Security and Pensions ===
- National Institute for Social Security
- Social Institute for Sea Workers
- Social Security General Treasury
- Social Security IT Department
- Legal Service of the Social Security Administration

== Ministry for Digital Transformation and Civil Service ==
=== Secretariat of State for Digitalization and Artificial Intelligence ===
- Spanish Agency for the Supervision of Artificial Intelligence (AESIA)

=== Secretariat of State for the Civil Service ===
- General Mutual Benefit Society of State Civil Servants (MUFACE)
- National Institute of Public Administration (INAP)
- State Agency for Digital Administration (AEAD)

== Independent agencies ==
The independent agencies or independent administrative authorities (AAI) are independent from the executive branch but relate to different government departments for budget allocation purposes.

=== Ministry of Finance and Civil Service ===
- Independent Authority for Fiscal Responsibility (AIReF)
- Council for Transparency and Good Governance (CTBG)

=== Ministry of Justice ===
- Spanish Data Protection Agency (AEPD)
- Independent Whistleblower Protection Authority (AIPI)

=== Ministry of Transport and Sustainable Mobility ===
- Independent Authority for the Technical Investigation of Accidents and Incidents

=== Ministry of Economic Affairs and Digital Transformation ===
- National Commission on Markets and Competition (CNMC)
- National Securities Market Commission (CNMV)

=== Ministry for the Ecological Transition and Demographic Challenge ===
- Nuclear Safety Council (CSN)

=== Ministry of Equality ===
- Independent Authority for Equal Treatment and Non-Discrimination
