= Ministry of Digital Transformation =

Ministry of Digital Transformation may refer to:

- Ministry of Digital Transformation (Spain)
- Ministry of Digital Transformation (Ukraine)
