= Secretariat of State for the Civil Service =

- Secretaría de Estado de Función Pública
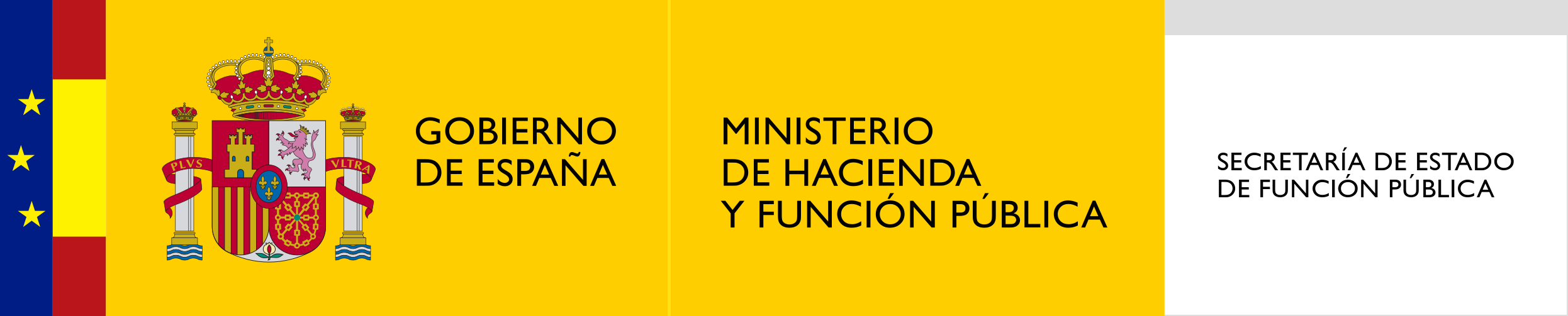

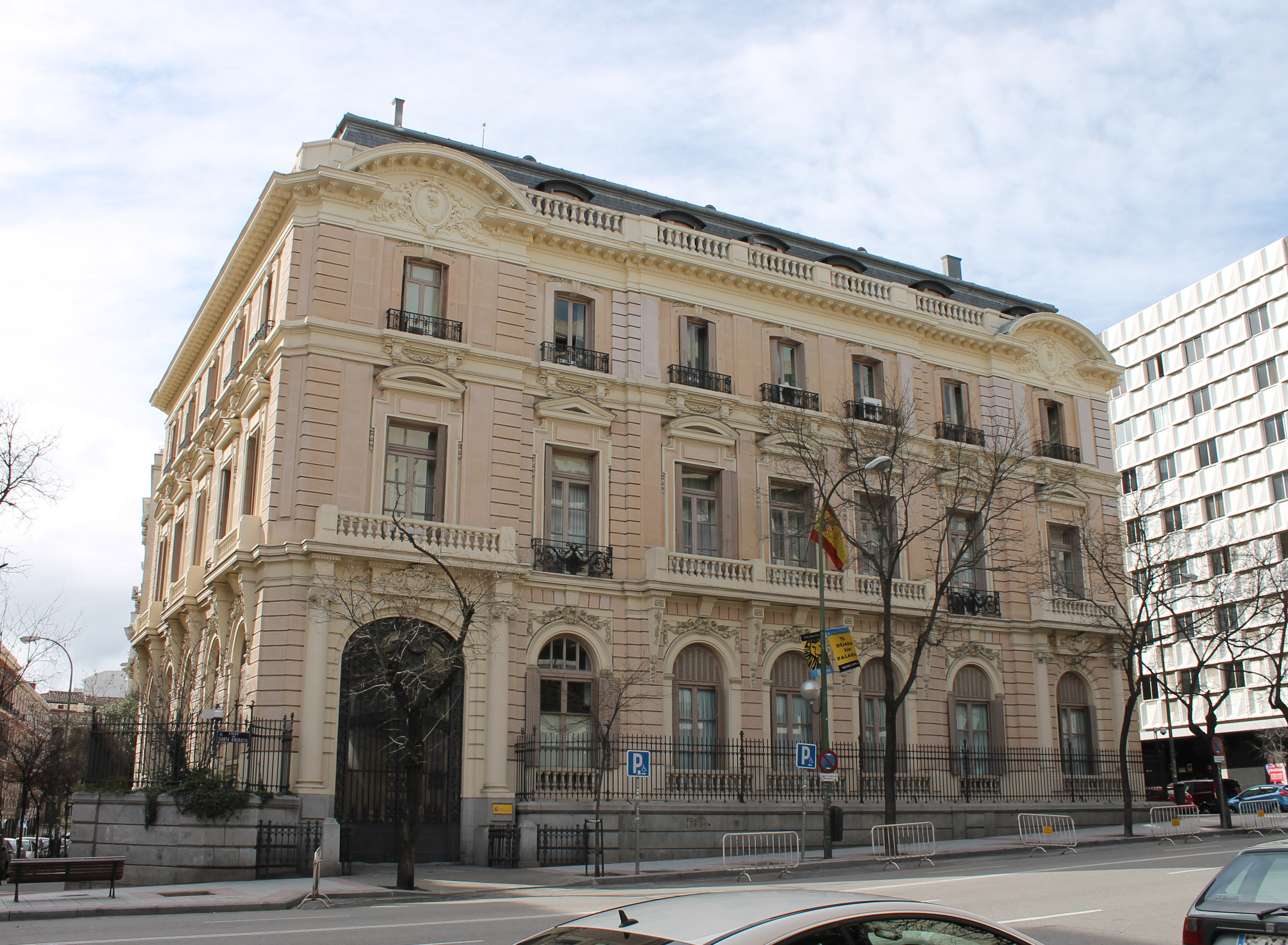
- Palace of the Countess of Adanero, headquarters of the SEFP

Agency overview
- Formed: July 4, 1977; 49 years ago
- Type: Secretariat of State
- Jurisdiction: Spanish government
- Headquarters: 7 Santa Engracia Street; Madrid
- Annual budget: €2,042 million
- Minister responsible: Óscar López, Minister
- Agency executives: Consuelo Sánchez Naranjo, Secretary of State
- Parent department: Department for Digital Transformation and Civil Service
- Child agencies: Institute for the Evaluation of Public Policies; National Institute of Public Administration; State Agency for Digital Administration
- Website: www.mptfp.gob.es(in Spanish)

The Secretariat of State for the Civil Service (Secretaría de Estado de Función Pública, SEFP) is a component of the Spanish Department for Digital Transformation and Civil Service responsible for the government policy on General State Administration's civil servants and other policies regarding civil servants of the regional and local administrations. In the past, it also exercised the powers related to e-administration.

The SEFP is integrated by three major departments, the Directorate-General for the Civil Service, the Directorate-General for Public Governance and the Conflicts of Interests Office; and a minor department, the Strategic Planning Office.

== History ==
The SEFP was created in July 1977 as Secretariat of State for the Public Administration, being one of the first modern Secretariats of State to be created in Spain. In April 2009 it was renamed as Secretariat of State for the Civil Service. The government reform of that year integrated the responsibilities on civil servants in the Ministry of the Presidency, which formerly had the Ministry of Public Administrations through its Secretariat of State for Public Administration. The SEFP was integrated by the secretary of state and the directors-general for the Civil Service, for the Promotion of Electronic Administration, and of Administrative Organization Procedures.

In October 2010, the Ministry of Territorial Policy and Public Administration is recovered and it re-assumes the powers on the civil service by assuming the Secretariat of State. This dependency hardly lasts a year because at the end of 2011 the change of government causes the abolishment of the ministry and the secretariat of state that is integrated into the Ministry of Finance and its powers are transferred to the Secretariat of State for Public Administrations.

The 2016 government reform recovers once again the Secretariat of State for the Civil Service and it increases its powers by adding to its structure the Directorate-General for Public Governance, the Conflicts of Interests Office and the General Secretariat for Digital Administration.

In June 2018, the Ministry of Territorial Policy is recovered and it assumes the Secretariat of State. In 2020, the secretariat of state is abolished and its powers were transferred to the Secretariat of State for Territorial Policy.

In July 2021, the department was recovered.

== Officials ==
As of December 2025, the SEFP officials are:

Official	Title	Portfolio
Consuelo Sánchez Naranjo	Secretary of State	Overall responsibility for the department.
María Isabel Borrel Roncalés	Director-General for the Civil Service	Setting guidelines on remuneration and jobs, planning and study of human resources policies, the preparation of public employment offers, national and international relations in the field of public employment and with trade union organizations, advice on public sector human resources, authorization and management of mobility processes, provision of jobs, acquisition of public employee status and management of employees.
Reyes Feito Castellano	Director-General for Public Governance	Inspection and improvement of public services, establish quality procedures, advice public administrations and its agencies on organization and procedures, facilitate the access of citizens and business to public services, open government, transparency affairs.
Flor María López Laguna	Director of the Conflicts of Interests Office	Ensure compliance with the law of incompatibilities of high-ranking officials and civil servants.
Juan Jesús Torres Carbonell	Director of the Agency for Digital Administration	It coordinates the policies regarding the digital transformation of the administration.

=== Agencies ===
From the Secretariat of State depends:

- The General Mutual Benefit Society of State Civil Servants.
- The National Institute of Public Administration.
- The State Agency for Digital Administration.
- The Independent Administrative Authority Council for Transparency and Good Governance.

== Budget ==
The Secretariat of State for the Civil Service has a budget of €2,042,389,420 for 2022. Most of the budget is destined to defray benefits to state civil servants, through the General Mutual Benefit Society of State Civil Servants (Mutualidad General de Funcionarios Civiles del Estado). According to the 2022 General State Budget, the SEFP participates in six programs:

Budget of the Secretariat of State for the Civil Service for 2022
Program No.	Program	Amount	Ref.
222M	Economic benefits of the Mutual Benefit Society through the General Mutual Benefit Society of State Civil Servants	€328,107,800	
312E	Healthcare of the Mutual Benefit Society through the General Mutual Benefit Society of State Civil Servants	€1,574,174,030	
921N	Management and organization of the Public Administration	€19,543,500	
921O	Training of Public Administration staff through the National Institute of Public Administration	€108,163,080	
921X	Evaluation of the public activity transparency through the Council for Transparency and Good Governance	€3,003,110	
92KC	Digital Transformation and Modernization of the State Administration	€5,898,950	
Total budget		€2,042,389,420	

== List of secretaries of state ==
The Secretary of State for the Civil Service chairs the Coordination Committee of Inspectorates-General of Services of the ministerial departments, the Open Government Forum and the Sectorial Committee on Open Government. It may also, where appropriate, preside over and by delegation of the Minister responsible, the ICT Strategy Committee.

Since 2009:

1. Carmen Gomis Bernal (2009–2010)
2. María Consuelo Rumí Ibáñez (2010–2011)
3. Elena Collado Martínez (2016–2018)
4. José Antonio Benedicto Iruiñ (2018–2020)
5. Lidia Sánchez Milán (2021–2024)
6. Clara Mapelli Marchena (2024–)
