= State Vehicle Fleet =

Agency of the Spanish Department of Finance

- Parque Móvil del Estado
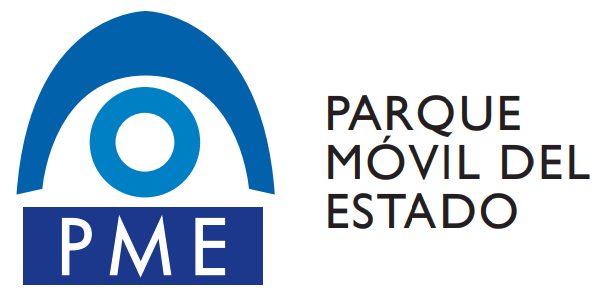

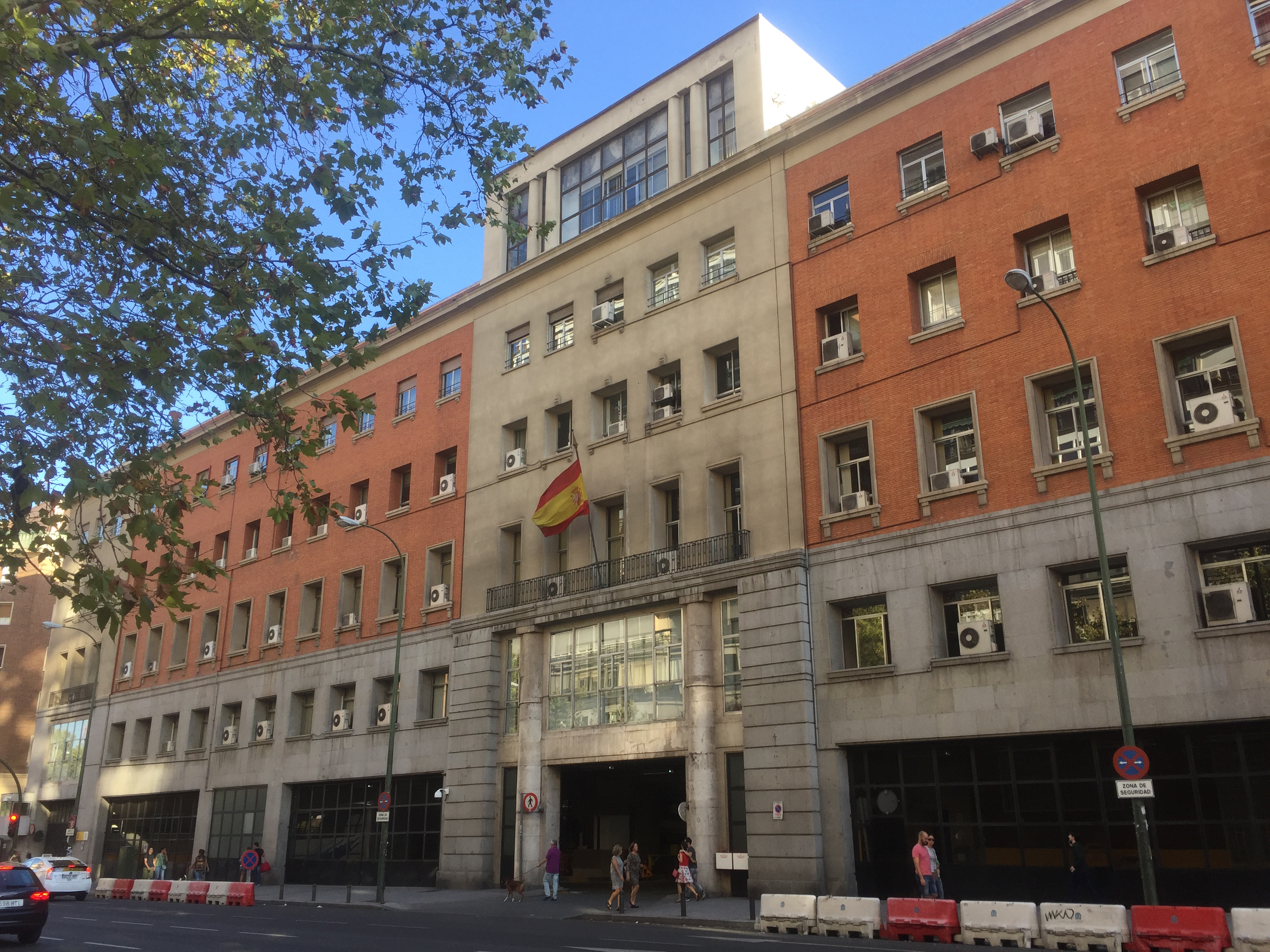
- Headquarters in Madrid

Agency overview
- Formed: September 28, 1935; 90 years ago
- Preceding agency: Vehicle Fleet of the Directorate-General for Security
- Jurisdiction: Spain
- Headquarters: Madrid
- Employees: 990 (as of 31 December 2025)
- Annual budget: € 50.6 million, 2026
- Agency executive: Miguel Ángel Cepeda Caro, Director
- Parent agency: Ministry of Finance
- Website: PME website

The State Vehicle Fleet (Spanish: Parque Móvil del Estado, PME) is an autonomous agency of the Spanish Department of Finance responsible for providing transportation to national-level authorities, both for the General State Administration and for the constitutional bodies (Royal Household, Parliament, Supreme Court, Constitutional Court, etc.). This organization provides all types of vehicles, including armored vehicles, as well as high-skilled drivers.

However, this agency does not provide transportation services to the Armed Forces, nor to the different law enforcement agencies, which have their own car services. In the case of the ministries of Transport and of Ecological Transition, PME only provides civil transportation to government officials and not the necessary machinery to exercise some of its responsibilities.

== History ==
Before the creation of this agency, little is known about how the vehicles at the disposal of the government officials were managed. It is known that, since the beginning of the 1920s, the commander and industrial engineer Julio Álvarez Cerón was responsible for the vehicles owned by the Directorate-General for Security and some other ministerial departments. At the end of that decade, government fleet at that time had barely a hundred vehicles.

=== Vehicle Fleet of Civil Ministries, Surveillance and Security ===
In the Second Republic, the number of vehicles skyrocketed, with more than 500 for both the Government Administration and the Administration of Justice.

For this reason, president Niceto Alcalá-Zamora, at the proposal of prime minister and minister of Finance, Joaquín Chapaprieta, issued the Decree of 28 September 1935, which created the current organization with the name of "Vehicle Fleet of Civil Ministries, Surveillance and Security" (PMMCVS), coexisting with those of the ministries of War, of the Navy and the Civil Guard. The new institution was part of the Ministry of the Interior. Later, it was regulated by a Decree of 9 March 1940, shaping it as the State agency in which the car services of all civil departments were concentrated, except the provincial services of the Ministry of Development (today Ministry of Transport).

Between the 1940s and 1950s, the current headquarters of the agency in Madrid was built, work of architect Ambrosio Arroyo Alonso, as well as the first vehicle auctions were held to get rid of the outdated vehicles of the fleet. A housing block for the agency's employees was also built in the San Cristóbal neighborhood with the help of the defunct National Housing Institute (1939–1977). With the founding of SEAT in 1950, its models were used as official cars.

=== Ministerial Vehicle Fleet ===
Subsequently, Decree 2764/1967, of November 23, transferred the agency to the Directorate-General for State Heritage of the Ministry of Finance, while promoting the process of unification of the State's automobile services. The Decree 151/1968, of January 25, renamed it as "Ministerial Vehicle Fleet" (PMM).

In the current democratic period, the Ministerial Vehicle Fleet was regulated by Royal Decree 280/1987, of January 30, and later by Law 50/1998, of December 30, on Fiscal, Administrative and Social Order Measures, which configured it as an autonomous commercial organization, attached to the Ministry of Finance through the Department's undersecretariat. A few years earlier, in 1983, the first civilian was appointed to head the agency, Eduardo Díaz Romón, and the first female drivers joined: Paula Hernando Ruiz (1988) and Arlestina Sánchez Medel (1991).

=== State Vehicle Fleet ===
Following the recommendations for restructuring and modernization made by the Court of Auditors in the 1990s, the Royal Decree 146/1999, of January 29, was approved, which gave the agency its current name, "State Vehicle Fleet" (PME), as well as modified its nature, structure and responsibilities, and the Royal Decree 1163/1999, of July 2, which merged the Territorial Delegations and Provincial Fleets into the Government Delegations and Subdelegations.

The last regulation of the agency was approved by the Council of Ministers in August 2022, although it did not represent anything new, but rather a recasting of independent regulations approved in the last twenty years.

== Directors ==
No.	Name	Term	Occupation	Ref.
1.º	Julio Álvarez Cerón	1935–1938	Military engineer	
2.º	Jesús Prieto Rincón	1939–1968	Military engineer	
3.º	Ricardo Goytre Bayo	1968–1977	Military engineer	
4.º	Vicente José Ausín Martínez	1977–1979	Military engineer	
5.º	Antonio Vera López	1979–1983	Military engineer	
6.º	Eduardo Díaz Romón	1983–1986	Regional auditor	
7.º	Domingo Sierra Sánchez	1986–1992	Civil servant	
8.º	Juan Alarcón Montoya	1992–1996	Civil servant	
9.º	Julián Pombo Garzón	1996–1997	Tax inspector	
10.º	Miguel Ángel Cepeda Caro	1997–2000	State auditor	
11.º	Pablo Fernández García	2000–2005	Civil servant	
12.º	José Carlos Fernández Cabrera	2005–2008	Tax inspector	
13.ª	Eva García Muntaner	2008–2012	Tax inspector	
14.º	Miguel Ángel Cepeda Caro	2012–pres.	State auditor	

== Relevant stats ==
As of 31 December 2025, the agency's fleet was composed by 666 vehicles (649 in 2024), which traveled almost 6.4 million kilometers and consumed 374,999 litres of fuel. The electric fleet, 559 vehicles, recharged 191,407 kWh at the PME charging stations. The agency employed 990 people, of which 882 were drivers (804 in 2024), representing 89.09% of the workforce.

Of the institutions that used these vehicles, the Royal Household had assigned 42 of them, while the Office of the Prime Minister had 66. The Royal House has also their own fleet managed by the Royal Guard. Also, the royal family had six PME's armoured vehicles at their disposal (the PM's Office had four), more than any other institution.

The rest of the fleet is distributed among the government departments (158), the General Council of the Judiciary (24) and the courts of Justice (57), the Council of State (14), the Court of Auditors (15), the Constitutional Court (14) and the Parliament (7). There are 269 vehicles that do not have a specific assignment.
