= Council for Transparency and Good Governance =

- Consejo de Transparencia y Buen Gobierno

Agency overview
- Formed: 12 December 2014; 11 years ago
- Type: Independent Administrative Authority
- Jurisdiction: Government of Spain
- Headquarters: Madrid, Spain
- Employees: 32 (As of 31 December 2024)
- Annual budget: €3.38 million, 2025
- Website: www.consejodetransparencia.es

The Council for Transparency and Good Governance (Spanish: Consejo de Transparencia y Buen Gobierno, CTBG) is a Spanish independent agency that is responsible for ensuring the transparency of public activity and guaranteeing citizens' right of access to public information.

The CTBG was formally established on 12 December 2014 and is governed by the Transparency, Access to Public Information and Good Governance Act of 2013 and its internal rules, last updated in 2024.

== History ==
The history of the Transparency Council began on 12 December 2014 with the appointment of its first president, Esther Arizmendi. The management team and its number of employees took shape during the first months of 2015. Arizmendi was appointed for a period of five years and she had to face a true political storm due to the coming to light of multiple cases of corruption. However, Arizmendi died in November 2017, before being able to finish her term.

After the death of the president, the deputy director-general for Transparency and Good Government, Javier Amorós Dorda, assumed the position on an interim basis until October 2020, when the government, after receiving authorization from the Congress of Deputies' Committee on Territorial Policy and Civil Service, appointed José Luis Rodríguez Álvarez as the second president.

In 2024, the internal rules of the CTBG were updated, which structured the agency through a Commission on Transparency and Good Governance, made up of seven members, and the Presidency of the Council, which is also the Presidency of the Commission. Likewise, the organizational chart was complemented with three deputy directorates-general (Transparency and Good Governance, State-level Claims and Regional and Local-level Claims), a General Secretariat to manage the agency on daily basis and a personal Cabinet for the president.

== Structure ==
=== Presidency ===
The Presidency of the Council for Transparency and Good Governance, which has the rank of under-secretary, is appointed by royal decree of the Council of Ministers, on the advice minister responsible for civil service, among people of recognized prestige and professional competence. The candidate needs the consent of the after the Civil Service Committee of the Congress of Deputies. The president has a five years, non-renewable, term.

Since 2014, these have been the presidents:

- Esther Arizmendi Gutiérrez (2014–2017†)
- Javier Amorós Dorda (2017–2020). Ad interim.
- José Luis Rodríguez Álvarez (2020–2026)
- María de la Concepción Campos Acuña (2026–present)

==== Administrative departments ====
The following administrative departments depend on the Presidency, all of them with the rank of deputy directorate-general:

- The Deputy Directorate-General for Transparency and Good Governance.
- The Deputy Directorate-General for State-level Claims.
- The Deputy Directorate-General for Regional and Local-level Claims.
- The General Secretariat, which manages the agency on daily basis.
- The Cabinet, as a support and immediate assistance body to the president.

=== Commission ===
The Council for Transparency and Good Governance is the collective governing body of the CTBG, which is entrusted with the task of advising on transparency, access to public information and good governance and reporting on these matters, as well as others on awareness-raising, support for the presidency and internal governance of the organization.

The Commission, headed by the president of the agency, is made up of seven other members, with a mandate of five years, renewable once, who are appointed at the proposal of the following organizations:

- The Congress of Deputies, which will propose one of its members.
- The Senate, which will propose a senator.
- The Court of Auditors, which will propose one of the Court's counselors as representative.
- The Ombudsman, who will propose a representative.
- The Spanish Data Protection Agency, which will propose a representative.
- The Ministry for Digital Transformation and Public Service, which will propose a representative of the Secretariat of State for the Civil Service.
- The Independent Authority for Fiscal Responsibility, which will propose a representative.

== See also ==
- Access to public information in Europe
- Right to know
- Corporate governance
