= National Institute of Public Administration (Spain) =

- Instituto Nacional de Administración Pública
- Logotype

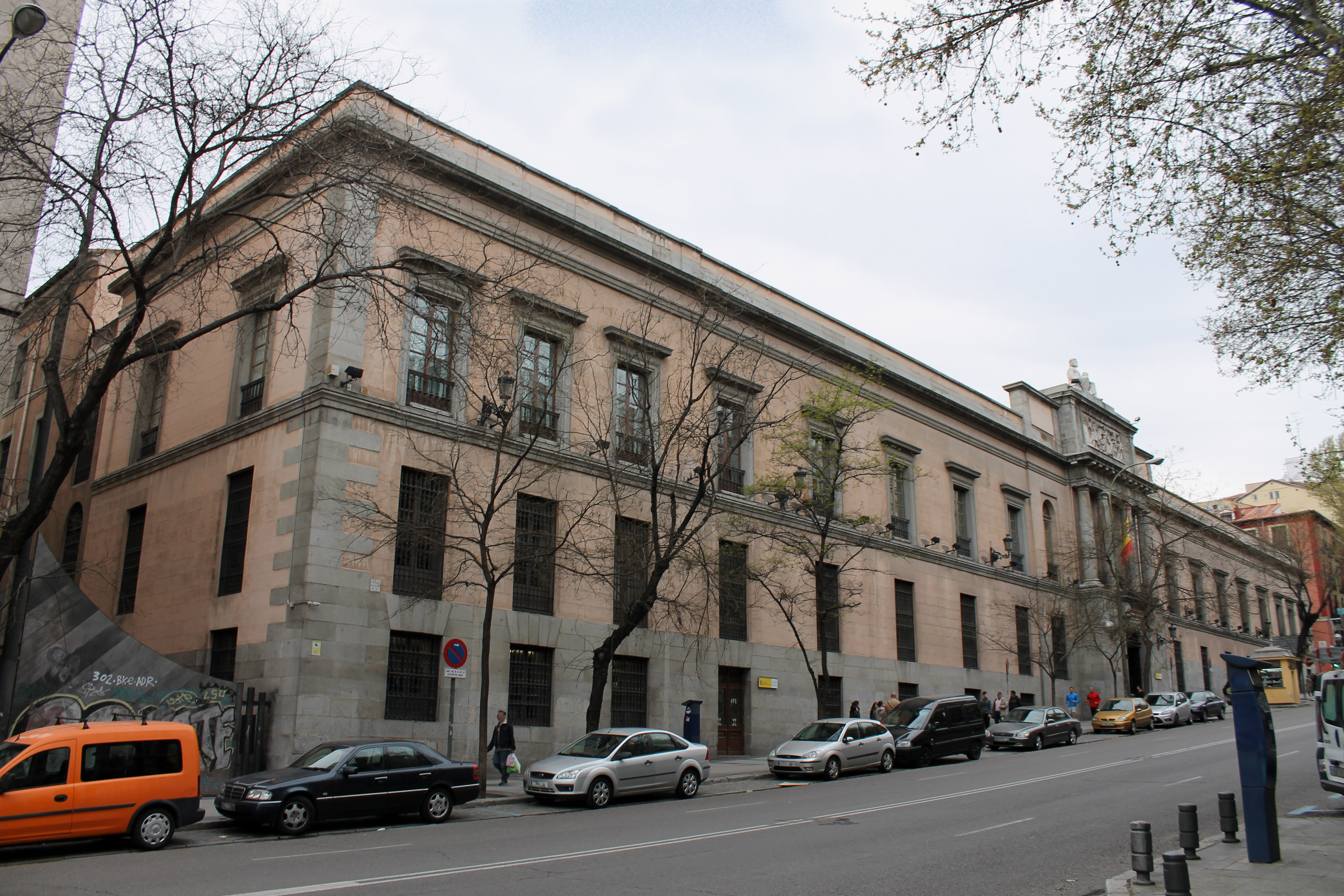
- Main headquarters in Madrid

Agency overview
- Formed: 22 September 1958; 68 years ago
- Preceding agency: Institute for Local Government Studies (1940–1987)
- Type: State agency
- Jurisdiction: Government of Spain
- Headquarters: Atocha street, Madrid
- Employees: 175 (as of 31 December 2022)
- Annual budget: €118,5 million (2023)
- Agency executive: Lorena González Olivares, Director-General
- Parent department: Ministry for Digital Transformation and Civil Service

The National Institute of Public Administration (Spanish: Instituto Nacional de Administración Pública, INAP) is an agency of the Spanish Department for Digital Transformation and Civil Service responsible for developing and implementing the recruitment and training policies for public employees, promoting and carrying out studies, publications and research on matters related to Public Administration and maintaining relations of cooperation and collaboration with other Administrations and public employee training centres, both national and international.

== History ==
The National Institute of Public Administration was established by order of minister-under secretary of the presidency, Luis Carrero Blanco, on 22 September 1958. In this order, the Office of the Prime Minister ratified its condition as the government department responsible for the civil service, and it created, within the Technical General Secretariat, the Civil Servants Training and Improvement Centre (Spanish: Centro de Formación y Perfeccionamiento de Funcionarios, CFPF).

In 1961 it was transformed into an autonomous agency and, in 1966, it was authorized the use of the name "National School of Public Administration" (ENAP) to refer to the agency. This name would evolve into the current National Institute of Public Administration (INAP), which was officially established in 1977.

A decade later, in 1987, the Institute for Local Government Studies, founded in 1940, was merged into the INAP.

In December 2023, a royal decree-law transformed the INAP into a state agency.
