= Iván Redondo =

Spanish political advisor (born 1981)

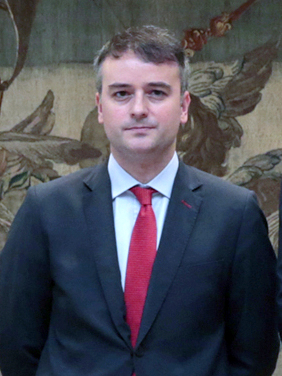

11th Moncloa Chief of Staff
- In office 11 June 2018 – 14 July 2021
- Prime Minister: Pedro Sánchez
- Preceded by: José Luis Ayllón
- Succeeded by: Óscar López

Personal details
- Born: 1981 (age 44–45) San Sebastián, Basque Country, Kingdom of Spain

Iván Redondo Bacaicoa (born 1981) is a Spanish political advisor who served as the 11th Moncloa Chief of Staff from 2018 to 2021.

== Biography ==
Born in 1981 in San Sebastián, he obtained a degree in Humanities and Communication at the University of Deusto.

He worked as advisor for Xavier García Albiol during the campaign of the People's Party (PP) politician for the 2011 Badalona municipal election, after which García Albiol became Mayor of Badalona. Appointed in 2012 as Chief of Staff of the Presidency of the Junta de Extremadura (an office with rank of regional minister), serving as advisor to José Antonio Monago, also a PP politician. He also worked in the Basque Country as advisor of PP's Antonio Basagoiti.

He began working with Pedro Sánchez during the preparation of the Spanish Socialist Workers' Party (PSOE) primary election in 2017.

He is credited with having planned the 2018 vote of no confidence in the government of Mariano Rajoy. Following the success of the later and the subsequent investiture of Pedro Sánchez as new Prime Minister, he was appointed as Chief of Staff of the Cabinet Office of the Presidency of the Government through a Royal Decree issued on 8 June and published in the BOE a day later. He was sworn in on 11 June.

On 25 January 2021 he tested positive for COVID-19 during COVID-19 pandemic in Spain, but with no symptoms and had no professional contact with anyone in the last 24 hours.

In July 2021 he was replaced as chief of staff by Óscar López in large cabinet reshuffle.
