= Ministry of Digital Transformation (Spain) =

Government ministry of Spain

Ministry for Digital Transformation and Civil Service
- Ministerio para la Transformación Digital y de la Función Pública

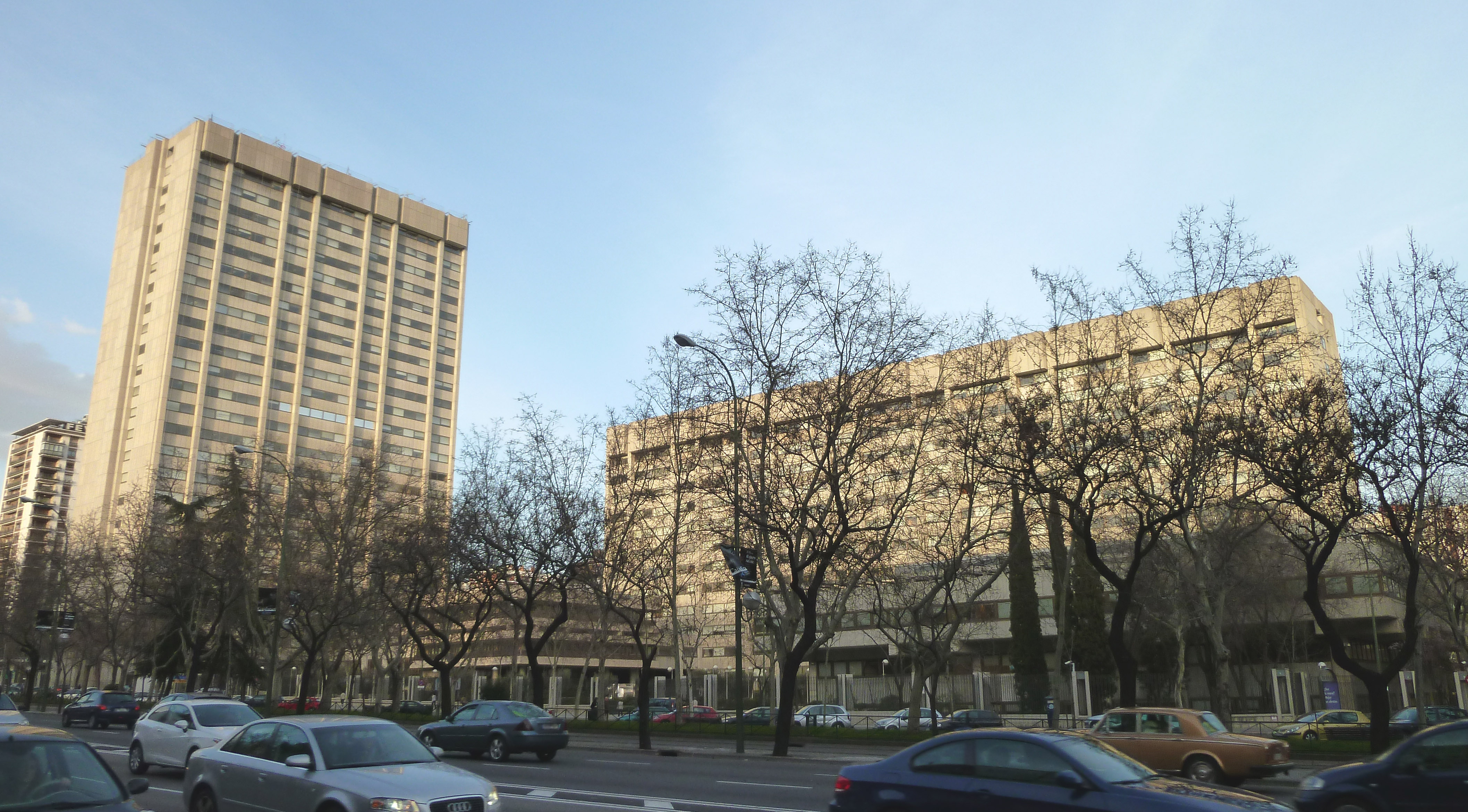
- Cuzco Government Complex, HQ

Agency overview
- Formed: 20 November 2023
- Preceding agency: Ministry of Economic Affairs and Digital Transformation (digital transformation) Ministry of Finance and Civil Service (civil service)
- Type: Ministry
- Jurisdiction: Government of Spain
- Employees: 2,695 (2024)
- Annual budget: €7.5 billion, 2026
- Minister responsible: Óscar López Águeda, Minister
- Agency executives: María González Veracruz, Secretary of State for Digitalization and Artificial Intelligence; Antonio Hernando, Secretary of State for Telecommunications; Clara Mapelli Marchena, Secretary of State for the Civil Service; Consuelo Sánchez Naranjo, Under-Secretary

The Ministry for Digital Transformation and Civil Service is a ministerial department of the Government of Spain. It is responsible for proposing, coordinating and executing the government policy on telecommunications, the information society, digital transformation and the development and promotion of artificial intelligence. It is also responsible for proposing and executing the government policy on public administration, civil service and public governance.

The department was created as part of the Sánchez III Government as a split from the Ministry of Economic Affairs and Digital Transformation. Later, the department received the civil service responsibilities from the Ministry of Finance. It is headed by Óscar López Águeda.

== Structure ==
Organizational chart of the Ministry for Digital Transformation, February 2024

The Ministry is structured as follows:

- The Secretariat of State for Digitalisation and Artificial Intelligence
  - The Directorate-General for the Organisation of Digitalisation and Audiovisual Communication Services.
  - The Directorate-General for Artificial Intelligence
  - The Directorate-General for Data
  - The Deputy Directorate-General for Grants
- The Secretariat of State for Telecommunications and Digital Infrastructure
  - The General Secretariat for Telecommunications, Digital Infrastructure and Digital Security
  - The Deputy Directorate-General for Programs Coordination and Implementation
- The Secretariat of State for the Civil Service.
  - The Directorate-General for the Civil Service
  - The Directorate-General for Public Governance
  - The Conflicts of Interest Office
- The Under-Secretary
  - The Technical General Secretariat
  - The Deputy Directorate-General for Economic Management and Budget Office
  - The Deputy Directorate-General for Human Resources and Inspection of Services
  - The Deputy Directorate-General for General Affairs and Coordination
  - The Deputy Directorate-General for Coordination and Monitoring of European Funds

=== Agencies ===
- The public company Red.es.
- The National Cybersecurity Institute (INCIBE).
- The Spanish Agency for the Supervision of Artificial Intelligence (AESIA).
- The General Mutual Benefit Society of State Civil Servants (MUFACE).
- The National Institute of Public Administration (INAP).
- The State Agency of Digital Administration (AEAD).

== Budget ==
In millions of euros (€)
1. Digital policy 2,830.2 (37.7%)
2. Telecommunications 2,561.1 (34.1%)
3. Civil Service 2,076.7 (27.6%)
4. Administration and general services 44.9 (0.60%)

For fiscal year 2023, extended to 2026, the Ministry for Digital Transformation and Civil Service has a consolidated budget of €7.5 billion. Of this amount, €5.4 billion are directly managed by the ministry's central services while €2.1 billion are managed by its agencies.

The budget can be divided into four main areas:

1. Digital policy (Programs 46KA, 46LA, 46MA, 46MC, 46NB, 46PR, 46RF, 46SA, 46SD, 46UE, 467G, 467I, 92KC & 94KC), which funds the government policy on digitalisation, artificial intelligence, data economy, innovation and the modernisation of the public sector.
2. Telecommunications (46OA, 46OB, 46OC, 46OD, 46OE, 46OG, 49OF, 49OS & 491M), comprising policies related to connectivity, digital infrastructure, 5G deployment and cybersecurity.
3. Civil Service (222M, 312E, 921N, 921O & 921X), covering the management of public employees, their social protection, and the organisation of the public administration.
4. Administration and general services (461N), covering the Ministry’s central services and administrative structure.

In addition, Programme 000X (“Internal Transfers and Disbursements”) is excluded from the analysis, as it consists of transfers between public sector entities and would otherwise lead to double counting and distort the overall budget.

=== Audit ===
The Ministry's accounts, as well as those of its agencies, are internally audited by the Office of the Comptroller General of the State (IGAE), through a Delegated Comptroller's Office within the Department itself. Externally, the Court of Auditors is responsible for auditing expenditures.

The Ministry's accounts are also subject to scrutiny by the relevant committees of the Congress of Deputies and the Senate.

== List of officeholders ==
Office name:

- Ministry of Digital Transformation (2023)
- Ministry for the Digital Transformation and of the Civil Service (2023–present)

Portrait	Name (Birth–Death)	Term of office			Party	Government	Prime Minister (Tenure)	Ref.
Portrait	Name (Birth–Death)	Took office	Left office	Duration	Party	Government	Prime Minister (Tenure)	Ref.
	José Luis Escrivá (born 1960)	21 November 2023	6 September 2024	290 days	Independent	Sánchez III	Pedro Sánchez (2018–present)	
	Óscar López (born 1974)	6 September 2024	Incumbent	1 year and 336 days	PSOE	Sánchez III	Pedro Sánchez (2018–present)	
