= Antonio Hernando =

Spanish attorney and politician

Antonio Hernando Vera
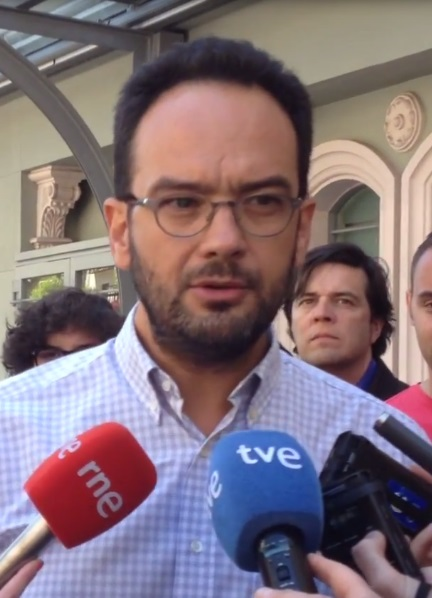
- Hernando in 2014

Leader for the Socialist Group in the Congress of Deputies
- In office September 9, 2014 – May 21, 2017
- Preceded by: Soraya Rodríguez

Personal details
- Born: November 4, 1967 (age 58) Madrid, Spain
- Party: PSOE
- Profession: Attorney

Antonio Hernando Vera (born November 4, 1967) is a Spanish attorney and politician. He was the Spokesperson for the Spanish Socialist Workers' Party in the Spanish Congress of Deputies from 2014 to 2017. He is also an MP for the province of Madrid.

In September 2024 he was appointed Secretary of State for Telecommunications.
