= Secretary of State for Telecommunications =

Secretary of State for Telecommunications and Digital Infrastructure
- Secretario de Estado de Telecomunicaciones e Infraestructuras Digitales
- Coat of Arms used by the Government

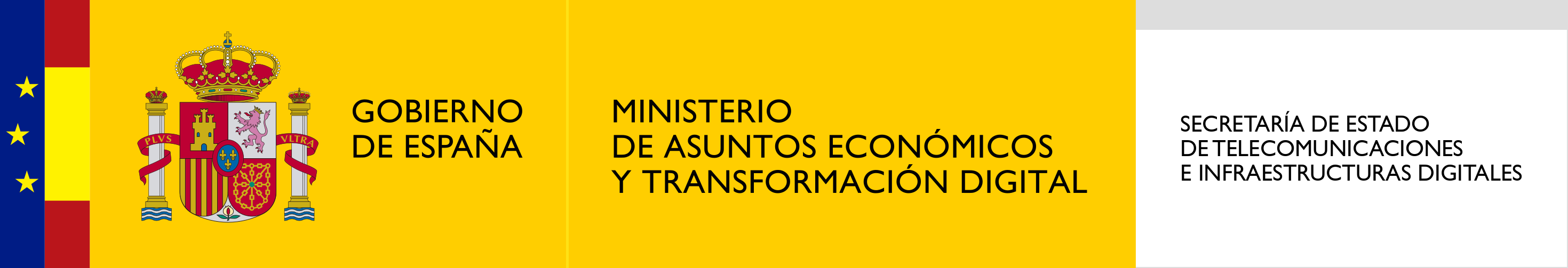

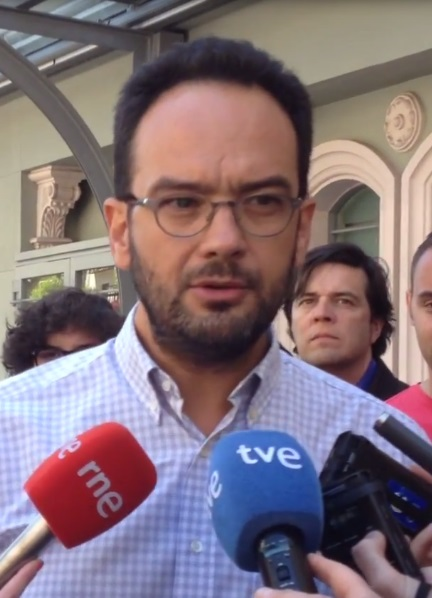
- Incumbent; Antonio Hernando Vera since September 24, 2024
- Ministry of Digital Transformation and Civil Service; Secretariat of State for Telecommunications and Digital Infrastructure
- Style: The Most Excellent (formal); Mr/Ms. Secretary of State(informal)
- Abbreviation: SETID
- Reports to: Minister for Digital Transformation
- Nominator: Ministry of Digital Transformation
- Appointer: Monarch
- Precursor: Secretary General for Communications
- Formation: April 27, 2000; 26 years ago
- First holder: Baudilio Tomé Muguruza
- Website: mineco.gob.es

The secretary of state for telecommunications and digital infrastructure (SETID) is senior minister of the Spanish Department of Economic Affairs and Digital Transformation.

The secretary of state for telecommunications is responsible for the promotion, regulation and knowledge of the telecommunications sector, audiovisual services and the Information Society, the dialogue with the professional, industrial and academic sectors and the coordination or cooperation between different ministries and with other public administrations regarding these matters.

The Secretariat of State, led by the SETID, is divided in two departments; one with the level of Directorate-General and other with the level of Deputy Directorate-General.

== History ==
Since the arrival of the democracy to Spain, becoming an advanced country was one of the goals of the first democratic governments and that means to have a good network of communications.

The importance was such that in 1977, a year before the Constitution was approved, a Ministry of Transport and Communications was created. This ministry assumed most of the competences that the current Secretariat of State for Communications has and the organs of this ministry dedicated to telecoms had most of them the level of Directorate-General.

In 1985, because of the fast growing of the communications systems and media, the department dedicated to telecoms in this Ministry was elevated to the level of General Secretariat and was divided in three departments: for mail, for telecoms and for communications infrastructure.

In 1990, the Ministry was fusionated with the Ministry of Development but maintain the communications department intact.

It wasn't until 2000 when the department was elevated to the level of Secretariat of State and the current department is officially created. At the beginning received the name of Secretariat of State for Telecommunications and for the Information Society and depended from the Ministry of Science from 2000 to 2004 and from the Ministry of Industry since 2004 to its renovation in 2016.

In 2016, a new government reestructuration created a new ministry with competences over Energy, Tourism and Communications, being called Ministry of Energy, Tourism and Digital Agenda. With this ministry, the Secretariat of State was renamed Secretariat of State for the Information Society and Digital Agenda.

Two years later, in 2018, a change in the government provoked that the competences over telecommunications were transferred to the Ministry of Economy and the Secretariat of State was renamed Secretariat of State for Digital Progress. In 2020, the position of secretary of state for digitization and artificial intelligence was created and it assumed some responsibilities. This new position also assumed the oversight for Red.es, a public company in charge of the development of programs to boost the digital economy, innovation, entrepreneurship, training for young people and professionals and support for SMEs by promoting the efficient and intensive use of information and communication technologies.

== Structure ==
Under the authority of the secretary of state, there are the following departments:

- The Secretariat General for Telecommunications, Digital Infrastructure and Digital Security.
  - The Deputy Directorate-General for Telecommunications Regulation.
  - The Deputy Directorate-General for Telecommunications Operators and Digital Infrastructure
  - The Deputy Directorate-General for Radio Spectrum Planning and Management
  - The Deputy Directorate-General for Telecommunications and Digital Infrastructure Inspection
  - The Deputy Directorate-General for User Services in Telecommunications and Digital Services
  - The Deputy Directorate-General for Digital Security
  - The Deputy Directorate-General for Market Analysis and Technological Foresight
  - The Provincial Offices for Telecommunications Inspection.
- The Deputy Directorate-General for Programs Coordination and Implementation.

== List of secretaries of state ==
No.	Image	Name	Term of office			Ministers serving under:	Prime Minister appointed by:
No.	Image	Name	Began	Ended	Days of service	Ministers serving under:	Prime Minister appointed by:
1º		Baudilio Tomé Muguruza	6 May 2000	3 August 2002	819	Anna Birulés	José María Aznar
2º		Carlos López Blanco	3 August 2002	1 May 2004	637	Josep Piqué	José María Aznar
3º		Francisco Ros Perán	1 May 2004	27 July 2010	2278	José Montilla Miguel Sebastián Gascón	José Luis Rodriguez Zapatero
4º		Bernardo Lorenzo Almendros	27 July 2010	10 May 2011	287	Miguel Sebastián Gascón	José Luis Rodriguez Zapatero
5º		Juan Junquera Temprano	10 May 2011	31 December 2011	235	Miguel Sebastián Gascón	José Luis Rodriguez Zapatero
5º		Víctor Calvo-Sotelo	31 December 2011	19 November 2016	1785	José Manuel Soria; Luis de Guindos	Mariano Rajoy
6º		José María Lassalle	19 November 2016	19 June 2018	1785	Álvaro Nadal	Mariano Rajoy
7º		Francisco Polo	19 June 2018	15 January 2020	575	Nadia Calviño	Pedro Sánchez
8º		Roberto Sánchez Sánchez	15 January 2020	5 October 2022	994	Nadia Calviño	Pedro Sánchez
9º		María González Veracruz	5 October 2022	24 September 2024	720	Nadia Calviño	Pedro Sánchez
9º		María González Veracruz	5 October 2022	24 September 2024	720	José Luis Escrivá	Pedro Sánchez
10º		Antonio Hernando Vera	24 September 2024	Incumbent	713	Óscar López Águeda	Pedro Sánchez
