= Spanish government departments =

Main bodies of executive authority of the government of Spain

The Spanish government departments, commonly known as Ministries, are the main bodies through which the Government of Spain exercise its executive authority. They are also the top level of the General State Administration. The number of ministerial departments and their organization are established by a royal decree of the Monarch, on the advice of the Prime Minister, and all of them are headed by a Cabinet member called Minister.

Although the main organization is established by the Premier, the ministers have autonomy to organize its own department and to appoint the high-ranking officials of the ministries. It exists the possibility of ministers without portfolio, which are minister-level officials entrusted with a specific task and that do not head a department.

As of 2026, there are currently 22 ministerial departments.

== Ministers ==
The Ministers or Government Ministers (historically Ministers of the Crown) are, after the Prime Minister and the Deputy Prime Ministers, the highest officials of the State Administration and together they form the Government of the Nation, which main decision-making-body is the Council of Ministers.

=== Appointment and dismissal ===
The ministers are appointed and dismissed by the Monarch at the proposal of the Prime Minister.

Both appointment and dismissal, to be effective, must to be published at the Official State Gazette, although exists some specific cases, previous to the approval of the 1997 Government Act, which dismissal was not published. Those cases are Manuel Gutiérrez Mellado, minister without portfolio between 1976 and 1977 and Francisco Fernández Ordóñez, minister of Justice from 1980 to 1981.

Unlike the portfolio ministers, the dismissal of ministers without portfolio entails the extinction of all the ministerial structure that supports them.

=== Responsibilities ===
According to the Government Act, the ministers, as heads of their departments, have competence and responsibility in the specific sphere of their actions, and they are responsible for exercising the following functions:

- To develop the action of the Government within the scope of their departments, in accordance with the agreements adopted in the Council of Ministers or with the orders of the Prime Minister.
- To exercise the regulatory power in the specific matters of their departments.
- To exercise the powers attributed to them by laws, the rules of organization and functioning of the Government and any other norm.
- To countersign, when necessary, the acts of the Sovereign in the sphere of its responsibilities.

The ministers, as members of the Government, meet in the following collective bodies:

- The Council of Ministers.
- The Government Delegated Committees.

=== Substitutions ===
The substitution of the ministers must be determined by a Royal Decree of the Prime Minister, and always has to fall on another member of the Government. The Royal Decree must express the cause and character of the substitution.

Since the entry into force of the Government Act in December 1997, substitutions have taken place on many occasions, either to assume the portfolio temporarily or to replace a minister in a specific matter. The substitution for "delivery" of the minister of Defense Carme Chacón in May 2008. She used her right to maternity leave and her responsibilities were temporary assumed by the Interior Minister, Alfredo Pérez Rubalcaba.

=== Minister without portfolio ===
These have been the ministers without portfolio that have existed since the transition to democracy:

| Portfolio | Name and term |
|---|---|
| Assistant Minister of the Regions | Manuel Clavero Arévalo (4 July 1977 – 5 April 1979) |
| Deputy Minister for Relations with the Cortes | Ignacio Camuñas Solís (4 July 1977 – 29 September 1977); Rafael Arias-Salgado y Montalvo (5 April 1979 – 17 January 1980) |
| Minister for Relations with the European Communities | Leopoldo Calvo-Sotelo (10 February 1978 – 8 September 1980); Eduardo Punset (8 September 1980 – 26 February 1981) |
| Assistant Minister to the Prime Minister | Joaquín Garrigues Walker (5 April 1979 – 2 May 1980); Rafael Arias-Salgado y Montalvo (17 January 1980 – 2 May 1980); Pío Cabanillas Gallas (8 September 1980– 26 February 1981); Jaime Lamo de Espinosa (1 December 1981 – 29 July 1982); Alberto Estella Goytre (15 January 1982 – 12 August 1982) |
| Assistant Minister to the Prime Minister for Public Administration | Sebastián Martín-Retortillo (2 May 1980 – 26 February 1981) |
| Assistant Minister to the Prime Minister for Legislative Coordination | Juan Antonio Ortega y Díaz-Ambrona (2 May 1980 – 8 September 1980) |
| Minister-Spokesperson of the Government | Pío Cabanillas Alonso (27 April 2000 – 10 July 2002) |

== Internal organization ==
Ministries may have Secretariats of State and, exceptionally, General Secretariats (with rank of undersecretariat) for the management of a sector of administrative activity. The executive bodies that are assigned to them are hierarchically dependent on them. The ministries have, in any case, an Undersecretariat and, depending on it, a Technical General Secretariat for the management of common services (HR, budget, assets, websites, security...).

On the other hand, are the Directorates-General, which are the management bodies of one or several functionally homogeneous areas. The directorates-general are organized in deputy directorates-general for the management of the competences entrusted to it. However, deputy directorates-general may be directly attached to other higher-level management bodies or to higher bodies of the ministry.

=== Creation, modification and suppression ===
Before of the approval of the 1997 Government Act, the Ministries and Secretariats of State had to be created by law, normally by a direct law passed by the Government in the form of Royal Decree-Law. After, the Government Act allowed the Prime Minister to approve a Royal Decree (secondary legislation) designing the government structure.

Currently, the Prime Minister only creates the Ministries and some of the highest bodies (like secretariats of State and Undersecretariats) while the principal internal organization is delegated into the ministers, which develop the structure of the bodies created by the Premier or create new ones. The order of the Minister is also a royal decree signed the Monarch and countersigned by the minister responsible for the public administration at the proposal of the competent minister.

The lowest bodies such as deputy directorates-general are created by a Ministerial Order (ranked below the royal decree) of the competent minister.

=== Hierarchy ===
The ministers are the superior heads of the department and direct hierarchical superiors of the secretaries of state. The executive bodies depend on the previous ones and they are hierarchically ordered among themselves in the following way: undersecretary, director general and deputy director-general. The secretaries-general have the rank of under-secretary and the technical secretaries-general have the rank of director-general.

Ministerial hierarchy:

1. Minister.
2. Secretaries of State.
3. Under-Secretaries and Secretaries-General.
4. Directors-General and Technical Secretaries-General.
5. Deputy Directors-General.

== Current ministries ==
The current Cabinet —the third government of Pedro Sánchez— was sworn in by King Felipe VI on 21 November 2023.

| Logo | Portfolio | Minister | First creation | Address | Budget (2026) | Website |
|---|---|---|---|---|---|---|
| | Office of the Prime Minister | | 1834 | Puerta de Hierro Avenue, Madrid | €134 million | www.lamoncloa.gob.es |
| | Office of the Prime Minister | Pedro Sánchez | 1834 | Puerta de Hierro Avenue, Madrid | €134 million | www.lamoncloa.gob.es |
| | Foreign Affairs, European Union and Cooperation (MAUEC) | | 1714 | 1 Province Square, Madrid | €2,124 million | www.exteriores.gob.es |
| | Foreign Affairs, European Union and Cooperation (MAUEC) | José Manuel Albares | 1714 | 1 Province Square, Madrid | €2,124 million | www.exteriores.gob.es |
| | Presidency, Justice and Relations with the Cortes (MPJRC) | | 1714 (Justice); 1974 (Presidency) | Justice: 45 San Bernardo Street, Madrid; Presidency: Puerta de Hierro Avenue, Madrid | €2,734 million | www.mjusticia.gob.es www.mpr.gob.es |
| | Presidency, Justice and Relations with the Cortes (MPJRC) | Félix Bolaños | 1714 (Justice); 1974 (Presidency) | Justice: 45 San Bernardo Street, Madrid; Presidency: Puerta de Hierro Avenue, Madrid | €2,734 million | www.mjusticia.gob.es www.mpr.gob.es |
| | Defence (MINISDEF) | | 1714 | 109 Paseo de la Castellana, Madrid | €14,058 million | www.defensa.gob.es |
| | Defence (MINISDEF) | Margarita Robles | 1714 | 109 Paseo de la Castellana, Madrid | €14,058 million | www.defensa.gob.es |
| | Finance (MH) | | 1714 | 5 Alcalá Street, Madrid | €19,334 million | www.hacienda.gob.es |
| | Finance (MH) | Arcadi España | 1714 | 5 Alcalá Street, Madrid | €19,334 million | www.hacienda.gob.es |
| | Interior (MIR) | | 1812 | 7 Amador de los Ríos Street, Madrid | €11,116 million | www.interior.gob.es |
| | Interior (MIR) | Fernando Grande-Marlaska | 1812 | 7 Amador de los Ríos Street, Madrid | €11,116 million | www.interior.gob.es |
| | Transport and Sustainable Mobility (MITMS) | | 1847 | 67 Paseo de la Castellana, Madrid | €11,458 million | www.transportes.gob.es |
| | Transport and Sustainable Mobility (MITMS) | Carlos Cuerpo | 1847 | 67 Paseo de la Castellana, Madrid | €11,458 million | www.transportes.gob.es |
| | Education, Vocational Training and Sports (MEFPD) | | 1900 | 34 Alcalá Street, Madrid | €6,775 million | www.educacionfpydeportes.gob.es |
| | Education, Vocational Training and Sports (MEFPD) | Pilar Alegría | 1900 | 34 Alcalá Street, Madrid | €6,775 million | www.educacionfpydeportes.gob.es |
| | Labour and Social Economy (MITES) | | 1920 | 63 Paseo de la Castellana, Madrid | €28,791 million | www.mitramiss.gob.es |
| | Labour and Social Economy (MITES) | Yolanda Díaz | 1920 | 63 Paseo de la Castellana, Madrid | €28,791 million | www.mitramiss.gob.es |
| | Industry and Tourism (MINTUR) | | 1928 | 160 Paseo de la Castellana, Madrid | €8,501 million | www.mintur.gob.es |
| | Industry and Tourism (MINTUR) | Jordi Hereu | 1928 | 160 Paseo de la Castellana, Madrid | €8,501 million | www.mintur.gob.es |
| | Agriculture, Fisheries and Food (MAPA) | | 1933 | 1 Paseo de la Infanta Isabel, Madrid | €8,412 million | www.mapa.gob.es |
| | Agriculture, Fisheries and Food (MAPA) | Luis Planas | 1933 | 1 Paseo de la Infanta Isabel, Madrid | €8,412 million | www.mapa.gob.es |
| | Health (MISAN) | | 1936 | 18 Paseo del Prado, Madrid | €1,022 million | www.sanidad.gob.es |
| | Health (MISAN) | Mónica García | 1936 | 18 Paseo del Prado, Madrid | €1,022 million | www.sanidad.gob.es |
| | Housing and Urban Agenda (MIVAU) | | 1957 | 67 Paseo de la Castellana, Madrid | €3,484 million | www.mivau.gob.es |
| | Housing and Urban Agenda (MIVAU) | Isabel Rodríguez | 1957 | 67 Paseo de la Castellana, Madrid | €3,484 million | www.mivau.gob.es |
| | Economy, Trade and Business (MINECO) | | 1977 | 162 Paseo de la Castellana, Madrid | €6,177 million | www.mineco.gob.es |
| | Economy, Trade and Business (MINECO) | Carlos Cuerpo | 1977 | 162 Paseo de la Castellana, Madrid | €6,177 million | www.mineco.gob.es |
| | Culture (MC) | | 1977 | 1 King's Square, Madrid | €1,155 million | www.culturaydeporte.gob.es |
| | Culture (MC) | Ernest Urtasun | 1977 | 1 King's Square, Madrid | €1,155 million | www.culturaydeporte.gob.es |
| | Territorial Policy and Democratic Memory (MPTMD) | | 1979 | 3 Paseo de la Castellana, Madrid | €411 million | www.seat.mpr.gob.es |
| | Territorial Policy and Democratic Memory (MPTMD) | Ángel Víctor Torres | 1979 | 3 Paseo de la Castellana, Madrid | €411 million | www.seat.mpr.gob.es |
| | Science, Universities and Innovation (MICIU) | | 1979 | 162 Paseo de la Castellana, Madrid | €8,197 million | www.ciencia.gob.es |
| | Science, Universities and Innovation (MICIU) | Diana Morant | 1979 | 162 Paseo de la Castellana, Madrid | €8,197 million | www.ciencia.gob.es |
| | Social Rights, Consumer Affairs and 2030 Agenda (MDSCA) | | 1988 | 18 Paseo del Prado, Madrid | €579 million | www.mdsocialesa2030.gob.es |
| | Social Rights, Consumer Affairs and 2030 Agenda (MDSCA) | Pablo Bustinduy | 1988 | 18 Paseo del Prado, Madrid | €579 million | www.mdsocialesa2030.gob.es |
| | Ecological Transition and Demographic Challenge (MITECO) | | 1996 | San Juan de la Cruz Square, Madrid | €8,862 million | www.miteco.gob.es |
| | Ecological Transition and Demographic Challenge (MITECO) | Sara Aagesen | 1996 | San Juan de la Cruz Square, Madrid | €8,862 million | www.miteco.gob.es |
| | Equality (MI) | | 2008 | 37 Alcalá Street, Madrid | €512 million | www.igualdad.gob.es |
| | Equality (MI) | Ana Redondo García | 2008 | 37 Alcalá Street, Madrid | €512 million | www.igualdad.gob.es |
| | Inclusion, Social Security and Migration (MISSM) | | 2020 | 39 José Abascal Street, Madrid | €204,813 million | www.inclusion.gob.es |
| | Inclusion, Social Security and Migration (MISSM) | Elma Saiz | 2020 | 39 José Abascal Street, Madrid | €204,813 million | www.inclusion.gob.es |
| | Digital Transformation and Civil Service (MTDFP) | | 2023 | 162 Paseo de la Castellana, Madrid | €7,503 million | www.digital.gob.es |
| | Digital Transformation and Civil Service (MTDFP) | Óscar López | 2023 | 162 Paseo de la Castellana, Madrid | €7,503 million | www.digital.gob.es |
| | Youth and Children (MIJUI) | | 2023 | 18 Paseo del Prado, Madrid | €203 million | www.juventudeinfancia.gob.es |
| | Youth and Children (MIJUI) | Sira Rego | 2023 | 18 Paseo del Prado, Madrid | €203 million | www.juventudeinfancia.gob.es |
