= María González Veracruz =

Spanish politician (born 1979)

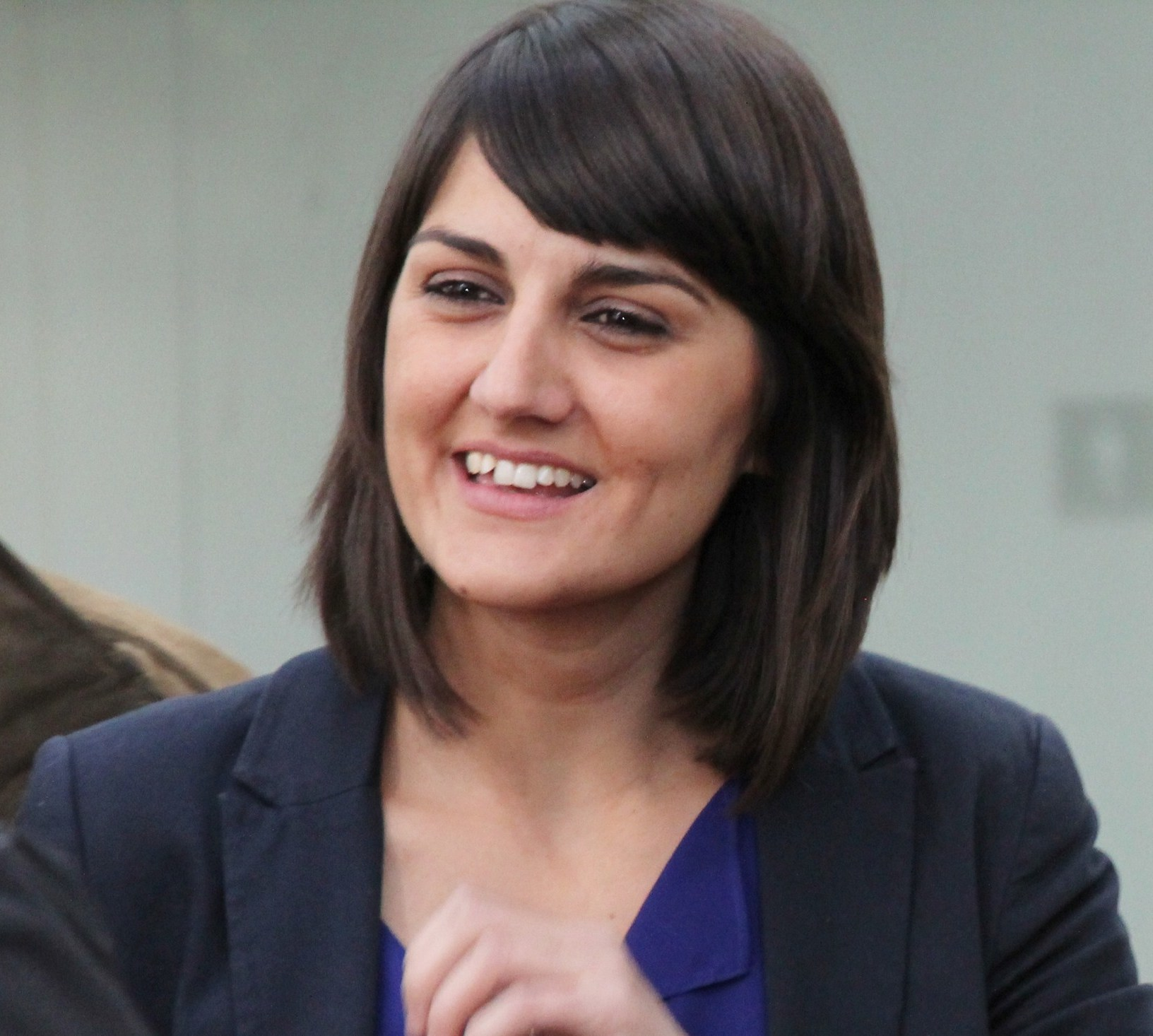

María González Veracruz (born 11 July 1979) is a Spanish politician of the Spanish Socialist Workers' Party (PSOE). She was a deputy in the Regional Assembly of Murcia (2007–2011) and in the Congress of Deputies (2011–2019). In 2022 she was named Secretary of State for Telecommunications and in September 2024 she was named Secretary of State for Digitalisation and Artificial Intelligence.

In October 2017, González Veracruz ran for secretary general of the Socialist Party of the Region of Murcia (PSRM). In the first round, she lost by 12 votes to mayor of Alhama de Murcia, Diego Conesa. In the run-off, she defeated him by 220 votes, due to receiving support from those who had previously backed eliminated candidate Francisco Lucas Ayala.

González Veracruz's father, Rafael González Tovar, was secretary general of the PSRM. In 2014, she gave birth to her first child, whom she named Rafael after his grandfather.
