= Óscar López (Spanish politician) =

Spanish politician (born 1973)

The Most Excellent Óscar López
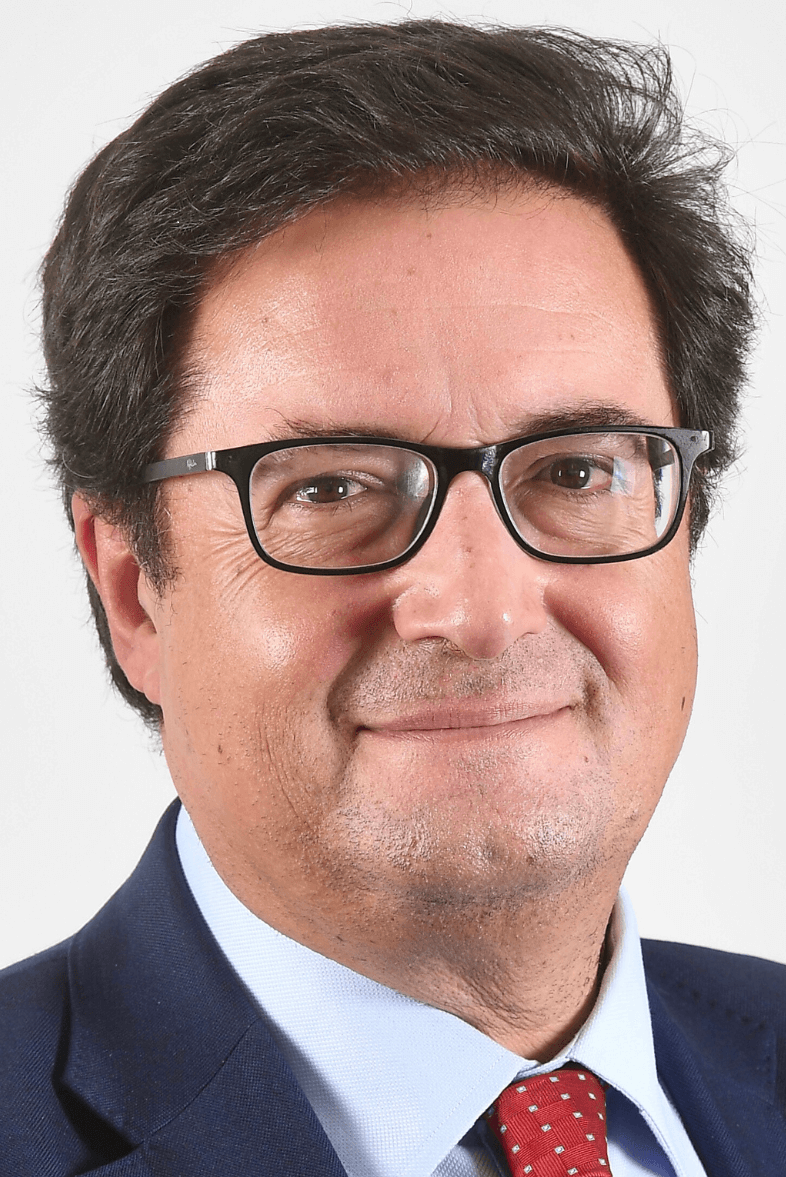

Minister for Digital Transformation and Civil Service
- Incumbent
- Assumed office 6 September 2024
- Prime Minister: Pedro Sánchez
- Preceded by: José Luis Escrivá

Secretary-General of the Socialist Workers' Party of the Community of Madrid
- Incumbent
- Assumed office 7 December 2024
- Preceded by: Juan Lobato

12th Moncloa Chief of Staff
- In office 14 July 2021 – 6 September 2024
- Prime Minister: Pedro Sánchez
- Preceded by: Iván Redondo
- Succeeded by: Diego Rubio Rodríguez

Leader of the Socialist Parliamentary Group at the Spanish Senate
- In office 22 June 2015 – 10 October 2016
- Preceded by: María Chivite
- Succeeded by: Vicente Álvarez Areces

Secretary of Organization of the Spanish Socialist Workers' Party
- In office 5 February 2012 – 27 July 2014
- Preceded by: Marcelino Iglesias
- Succeeded by: César Luena

Secretary-General of the Socialist Party of Castile and León
- In office 20 September 2008 – 14 April 2012
- Preceded by: Ángel Villaba
- Succeeded by: Julio Villarrubia

Member of the Congress of Deputies
- In office 17 August – 6 December 2023
- Constituency: Madrid
- In office 2 April 2004 – 13 June 2011
- Constituency: Segovia

Member of the Senate
- In office 10 September 2014 – 24 July 2018
- Appointed by: Cortes of Castile and León
- In office 13 July 2011 – 20 February 2012
- Appointed by: Cortes of Castile and León

Member of the Cortes of Castile and León
- In office 13 June 2011 – 12 September 2014
- Constituency: Segovia

Personal details
- Born: 7 April 1973 (age 53) Madrid, Spain
- Party: Spanish Socialist Workers' Party
- Occupation: Politician

Óscar López Águeda (born April 7, 1973) is a Spanish politician serving as minister for Digital Transformation and Civil Service of Spain since 2024.

== Political career ==
He joined the Spanish Socialist Workers' Party (PSOE) in 1996 and he was an advisor to the Socialist Parliamentary Group in the European Parliament between 1997 and 2000, due to his status as an expert in international relations.

Upon his return to Spain, he was hired by the new Socialist Secretary of Organization, José Blanco López, who appointed him coordinator of the Secretariat for Organization and Electoral Action, a position he held between September 2000 and June 2008. In 2005, he was a full member of the PSOE executive committee.

At the same time, López was a member of the Congress of Deputies representing Segovia in the 8th and 9th Legislatures (2004-2011) and spokesman for the Parliamentary Control Commission of RTVE, as he was the rapporteur of the bill to reform the financing of the RTVE Corporation.

On 20 September 2008 he was appointed Secretary-General of the PSOE of Castilla y León, leaving his national party offices. He remained in this position until 14 April 2012, when he decided not to stand for re-election and to focus on his role as Secretary of Organization of the PSOE.

He was Spokesperson for the Spanish Socialist Workers' Party (Socialist Group) at the Senate between 2015 and 2016.

From July 2021 to September 2024, he was the 12th Moncloa Chief of Staff.

He was elected to the 15th Congress of Deputies in the 2023 Spanish general election from Madrid.

In September 2024, he was appointed minister for Digital Transformation and Civil Service.
