= Office of the Prime Minister (Spain) =

Government organization in Spain

- Presidencia del Gobierno

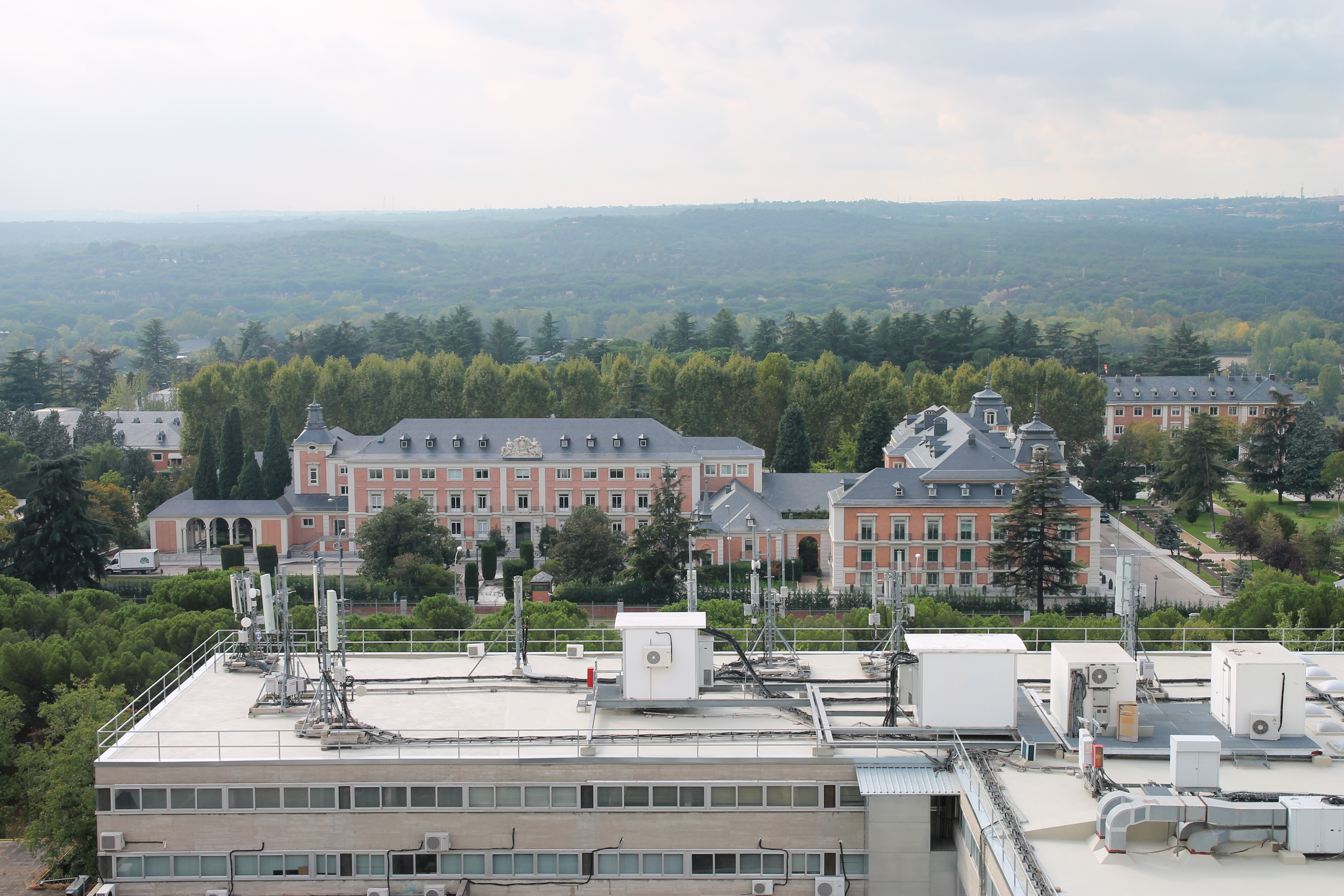
- View of the Moncloa Complex

Agency overview
- Formed: 1834; 192 years ago
- Type: Ministry (1851–1974)
- Jurisdiction: Government of Spain
- Headquarters: Moncloa Palace, Madrid
- Employees: Around 2,000
- Annual budget: € 134 million, 2026
- Minister responsible: Pedro Sánchez, Prime Minister
- Agency executives: Félix Bolaños, Minister of the Presidency, Justice and Relations with the Cortes; Diego Rubio Rodríguez, Chief of Staff; Judit Alexandra González Pedraz, Secretary-General; Ion Antolín Llorente, Secretary of State for Press
- Child agency: Patrimonio Nacional
- Website: Official website

The Office of the Prime Minister, officially Presidency of the Government (Spanish: Presidencia del Gobierno) is the Spanish government structure that groups all the departments and officials that are at the service of the prime minister to fulfil its constitutional duties. It is staffed by a mix of career civil servants and advisers. The highest-ranking official within the Office is the Chief of Staff, which is a political appointment on which the rest of the Office officials depend.

The Office of the Prime Minister, although in the past it was a ministerial department, like any other Ministry, today it does not have a specific legal definition, although its existence is foreseen on the Legal Regime of the Public Sector Act of 2015, when it regulates the Ministries.

Established in 1834, the 1851 General State Budget elevated it to the rank of Ministry, a situation that would last until 1974, when the Ministry of the Presidency was created. Since then, it no longer has the rank of ministry, although its structure and functions are established by a royal decree, and it operates as one.

== History ==
=== Origins and ministerial rank ===
The history of the Presidency of the Government dates back to 1834. On this date, the Royal Statute was promulgated, creating for the first time an executive power differentiated but not separated from the Crown, led by the prime minister (at that time called the president of the Council of Ministers). From this moment, a series of officials were appointed and a series of offices were established to assist the chief executive, which gave rise to the "Presidency of the Council of Ministers".

These personnel assisting the prime minister were assigned to the Ministry of State, since in the first years of the Spanish constitutionalism the president of the Council of Ministers was also secretary or minister of State. In 1851, for the first time, a specific budgetary item —titled "Expenses of the Secretariat and Presidency of the Council of Ministers" — was established, within the section of the Ministry of State; and later a section of its own would be created. That same year, the importance of the Presidency continued to increase, granting it powers over some matters related to overseas territories —except for matters related to the Treasury, War and Navy— and creating the Directorate-General for Overseas and the Overseas Council, both assigned to the Presidency of the council, and was given its own structure and budget, which for the year 1853 amounted to 1.7 million reales. It also managed the General Archive of the Indies and the General Superintendence of Finance of the Indies.

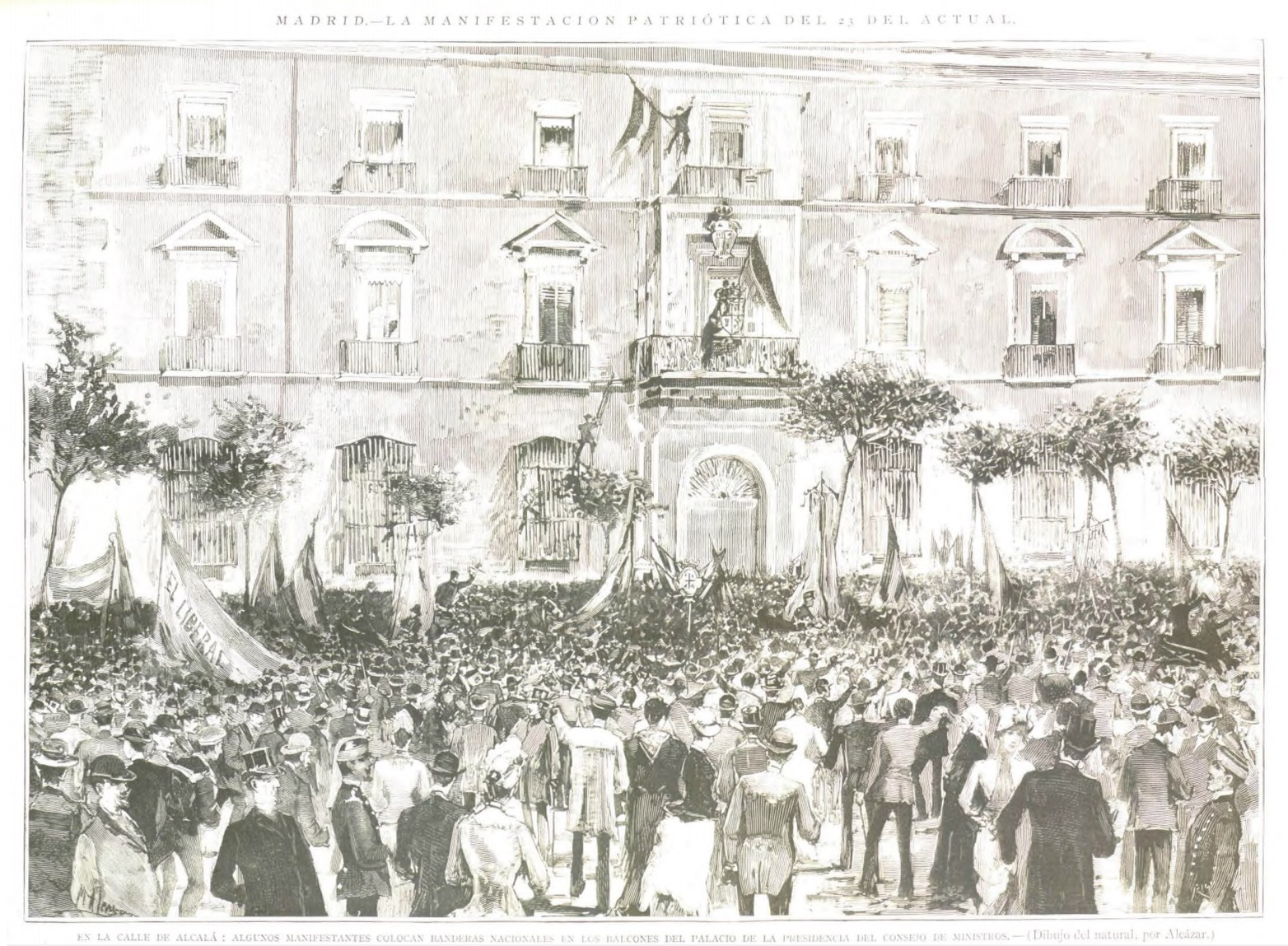
A protest in front of the headquarters of the Presidency of the Council of Ministers (Casa de los Heros) in 1885.

In 1854 the Overseas responsibilities were transferred to the Ministry of State, maintaining only a secretariat. In 1856 the Statistical Commission of the Kingdom was created and attached to the Presidency. During the next few years, a large part of its allocation corresponded to statistical services, with a budget of 3.5 million reales in 1859 or 11.6 million in 1860, (Note: The budget increase from 1859 to 1860 was due to various factors, including the greater territorial implementation of the statistical services, new geographic work projects and parcel plans, as well as the preparation of the 1860 census.) leaving only 170,000 reales for personnel and material resources of the Presidency. From this decade it also assumed the assignment of the Council of State, an advisory body headed by the prime minister, and in 1870 the statistical, geographical and cadastral powers definitively transferred to the Ministry of Development.

From 1865 to 1870 several reforms were made to the Office of the Prime Minister to resemble a ministerial department, including the creation of an undersecretariat.

In 1871 the Presidency was moved to a central property in Madrid, known as Casa de los Heros, and it was established a new budgetary item for the conservation and maintenance of the building. Likewise, that same year, on January 26, the Archive of the Presidency of the Council of Ministers (today of the Government) was created, which today also acts as the Central Archive of the Ministry of the Presidency. During the brief First Republic, between 1873 and 1874, it was called the "Presidency of the Executive Branch of the Republic", maintaining structure and powers.

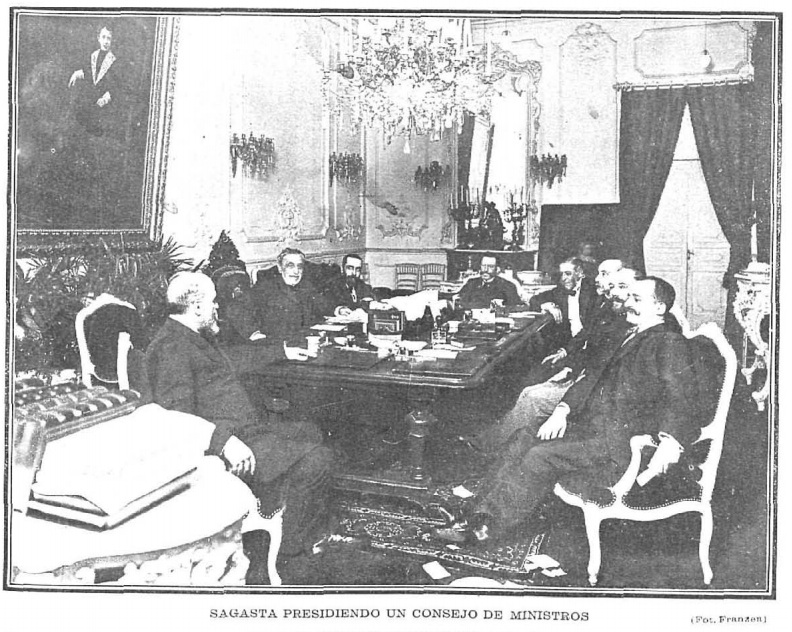
Prime Minister Práxedes Mateo Sagasta presiding over a Council of Ministers at the beginning of the 20th century.

The economic protectionism that was imposed in Spain in the last decades of the 19th century and the beginning of the 20th century, led to the approval of the Law of 14 February 1907, which established that only national products could be purchased by the Public Administrations. To ensure compliance with the law, the Commission for the Protection of National Production was established, which was attached to the Presidency. Likewise, in 1914, the Office of the Civil Comptroller for War and Navy and for the Protectorate of Morocco was created in this department.

=== 20th century changes ===
During the dictatorship of Miguel Primo de Rivera, various changes occurred. On the one hand, in December 1925 the Undersecretariat of the Presidency was abolished (until 1930) and the Directorate-General for Morocco and Colonies was created. On the other hand, in 1928 the Ministry of State was integrated into the Presidency, and the department was renamed to "Presidency and Foreign Affairs". It didn't last long; With the fall of the dictator in 1930, the departments were reestablished as they were at the beginning of the dictatorship.

During the Second Republic, more powers were added to the Presidency, regarding population and land organization through the Parceling and Colonization Section of the Directorate-General for Social Action and in aeronautical matters, with a Directorate-General for Aeronautics.

After the Civil War and the dictatorship was imposed, in 1939 it was renamed as "Presidency of the Government" —linked to the Head of State—, a name that continues to this day. During the first years, some organizations attached to the Presidency were created to control some industries, such as the Government Delegation in the Steel Industries, the Railway Material Commissariat or the Delegation for Transport Planning, among others. In 1942, the Directorate-General for Morocco, which had been in the Ministry of Foreign Affairs since 1939, returned to the Presidency.

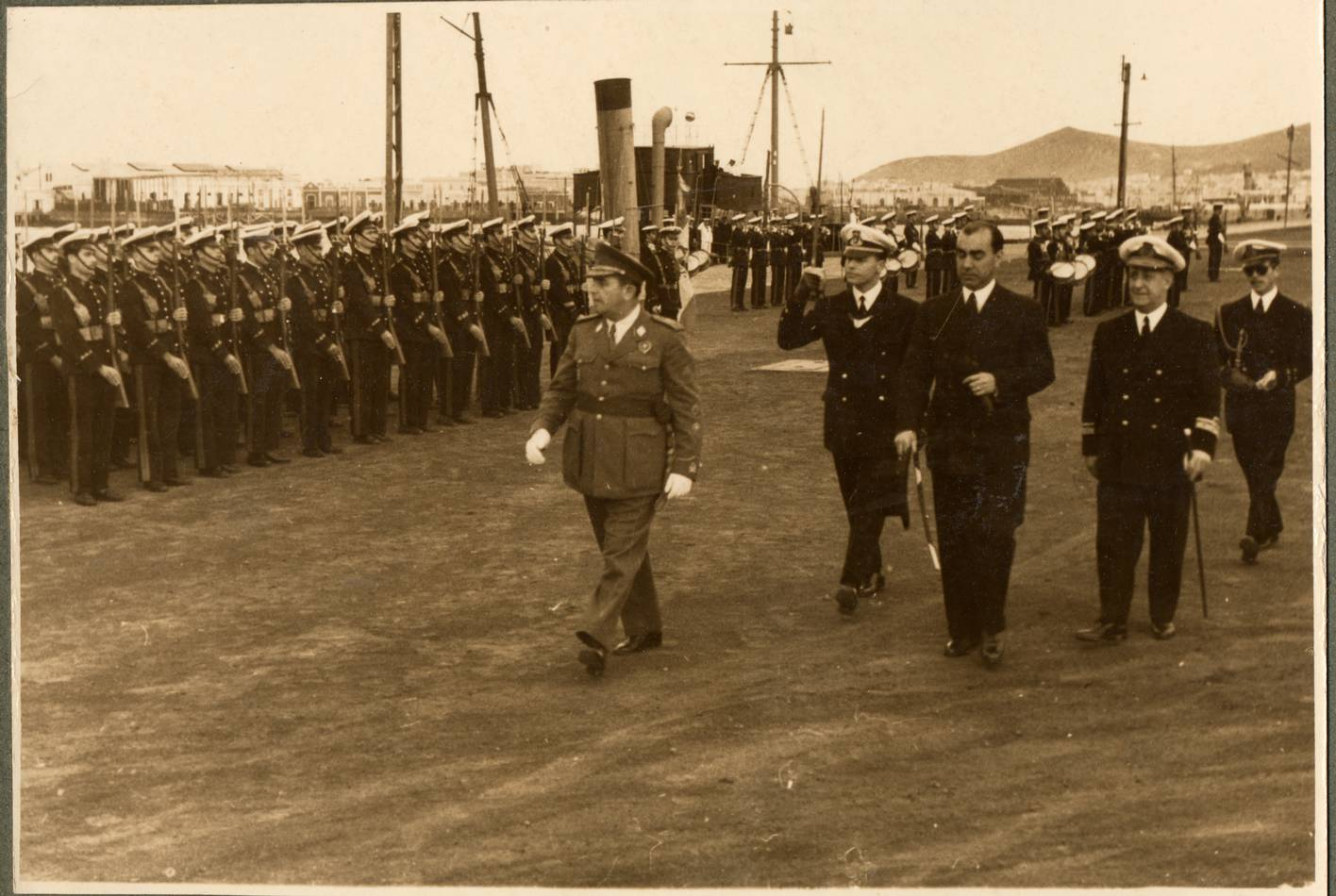
The Under Secretary of the Presidency, Luis Carrero Blanco (civilian, center), in 1947. Four years later, his post would be elevated to the rank of minister.

After the appointment of Luis Carrero Blanco as Under Secretary of the Presidency in 1941, this body became a key piece of the regime, with Carrero Blanco being the dictator's right hand. So much so, that in 1951 the position was given the rank of minister, being the seed of the current Ministry of the Presidency that today assists the prime minister and the collective bodies of the Government.

During the decades of 1950 and 1960, the Minister-Under Secretary of the Presidency was the promoter of the administrative reforms. In 1957 the Official State Gazette was assigned to him, the Office for Coordination and Economic Programming was created in the field of the Technical General Secretariat and the powers regarding civil servants were centralized, with the creation of the Centre for Training and Improvement of Civil Servants (in 1958, currently National Institute of Public Administration), the Higher Personnel Commission and the Directorate-General for the Civil Service.

In 1968, a series of decrees were approved that reorganized the services of the Presidency, establishing six management bodies —Undersecretariat, Commissariat for the Economic and Social Development Plan, Technical General Secretariat, Directorate-General for the Civil Service and the Directorate-General for the Geographic and Cadastral Institute—, five consultative and advisory bodies —Council of State, Council of National Economy, Higher Personnel Commission, Advisory Commission for Scientific and Technical Research and Commission for Income and Prices—, three organizations autonomous bodies—National Industry Institute, the National School of Public Administration and the Official State Gazette—and six other organizations of different categories.

=== Ministry of the Presidency and loss of ministerial rank ===
In 1973, the dictator decided to separate the Presidency of the Government from the Head of State, appointing Luis Carrero Blanco as prime minister. Also, in January 1974 the position of Minister-Undersecretary of the Presidency was divided into two, formally creating the Ministry of the Presidency.

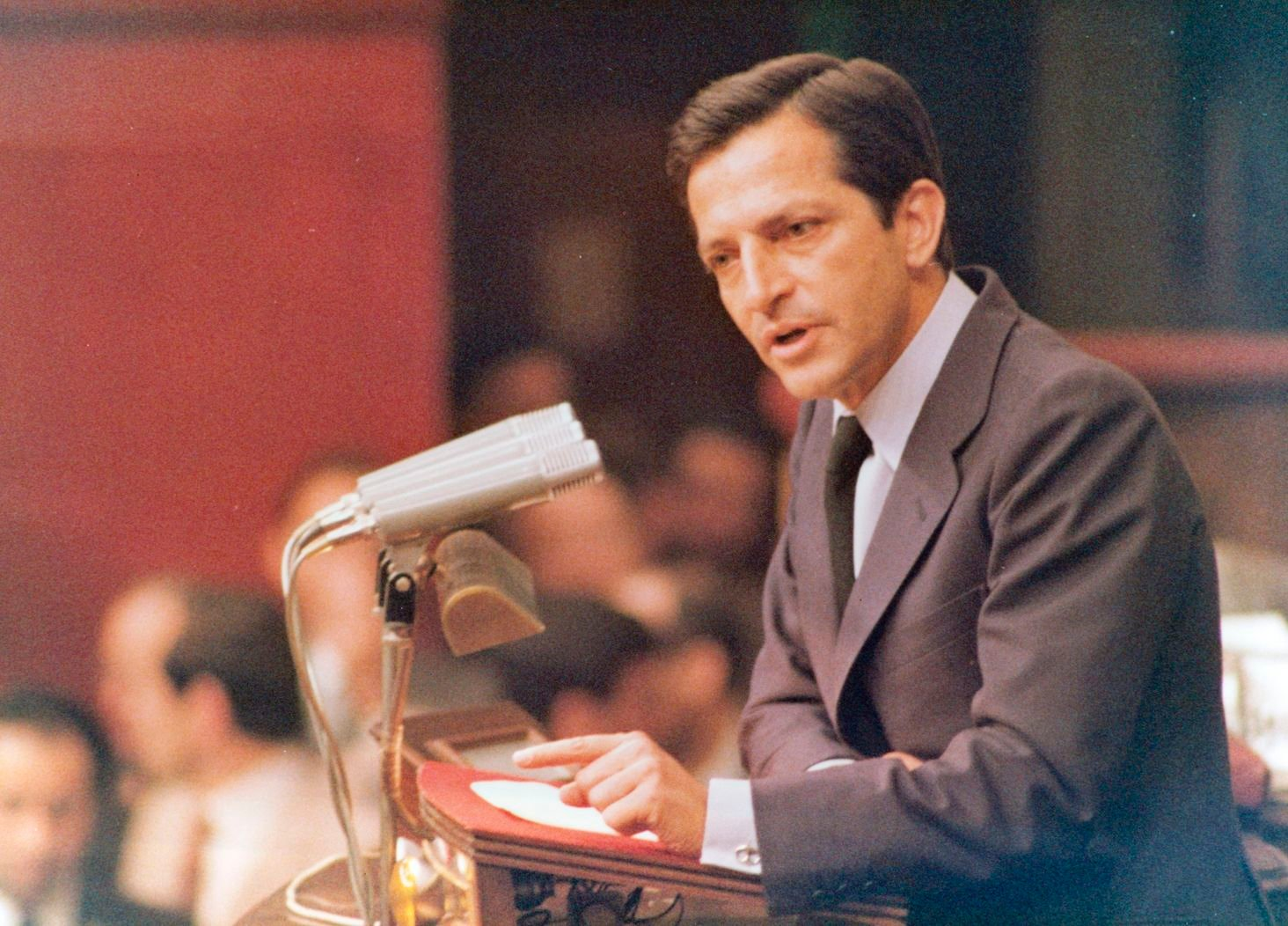
During the premiership of Adolfo Suárez (1976–1981), the modern Office of the Prime Minister took shape.

After these events, the line that separates the bodies of the Presidency of the Government from the bodies of the Ministry of the Presidency is blurred and will not be clarified until 1976. In that year, the minister of the Presidency, Alfonso Osorio, approves a Royal Decree which determines which bodies are integrated in his department, that is, in the Ministry of the Presidency, and which bodies are part of the Presidency of the Government (the Office of the Prime Minister), answering directly to the chief of the executive. This was done two months after prime minister Adolfo Suárez, appointed Carmen Díez de Rivera as the first Moncloa Chief of Staff, creating de facto the Cabinet Office.

In 1977 another differentiation was established between the Ministry and the Presidency of the Government, establishing that the Ministry of the Presidency was a body to assist the prime minister, integrated into the Office of the Prime Minister. Thus, in 1977 the Presidency was made up of: the Ministry of the Presidency, the advisors of the prime minister, the Cabinet Office and the prime minister's private secretariat.

Once this was clarified, it was clear that the Presidency of the Government had lost its ministerial status, handing it over to a new department headed by the minister of the Presidency with exclusive dedication, while the Presidency was an undefined entity composed of those bodies and advisors that the head of government considers it appropriate to create or appoint, although always assisted financially and organically by the Ministry of the Presidency. Likewise, since the 1980s, differentiated royal decrees have been approved that separately regulate the Presidency of the Government and the Ministry of the Presidency.

In 2015, although it did not formally restore its ministerial rank, the Legal Regime of the Public Sector Act, when it regulates the Ministries (Chapter II of Title I), it does foreseen the existence of the Presidency and it established the same regulation for the Presidency and the rest of ministries.

== Organization ==
Organizational chart of the Prime Minister's Office, July 2025

The current structure of the Office of the Prime Minister is regulated in Royal Decree 676/2025, of July 28:

- The Prime Minister.
  - The Ministry of the Presidency, Justice and Relations with the Cortes.
    - The Secretariat of State for Justice.
    - The Secretariat of State for Relations with the Cortes and Constitutional Affairs.
    - The Undersecretariat of the Presidency.
    - The Office of the Solicitor General.
  - The Cabinet Office, headed by the Moncloa Chief of Staff with the rank of secretary of state.
    - The Office of the Deputy Moncloa Chief of Staff, with the rank of undersecretariat.
      - The Department for National Security, with the rank of directorate-general.
      - The Department for Strategic Foresight and Scientific Advice.
        - The National Foresight and Strategy Office.
        - The National Scientific Advisory Office.
      - The Department for Cultural Affairs.
      - The Department for Speech.
    - The General Secretariat of the Prime Minister's Office, with the rank of undersecretariat.
      - The Department for Technical and Legal Coordination.
      - The Department for Protocol.
      - The Department for Security.
    - The General Secretariat for National Policy.
      - The Department for Public Policies.
      - The Department for Territorial Analysis.
      - The Department for Political and Social Innovation.
      - The Department for Strategic Studies.
    - The General Secretariat for Institutional Relations and Citizens.
      - The Department for Institutional Affairs.
    - The Department for European Affairs.
    - The Department for Foreign Affairs.
  - The Office for Economic Affairs and G20, with the rank of secretariat of state.
    - The Department for Strategic Projects and Sector Policies.
  - The Office of the Government Spokesperson.
    - The Secretariat of State for Press.
      - The Department for National Information.
      - The Department for International Information.
      - The Department for Regional Information.
      - The Digital Department.
      - The Department for Information Coordination.
      - The Department for Institutional Communication.

In accordance with the National Heritage Regulatory Act of 1982 and Royal Decree 204/2024, which develops the structure of the Ministry of the Presidency, the Patrimonio Nacional agency is attached to the Prime Minister's Office through that department.

=== Coordination committee ===
To ensure the coordination of all the departments of the Presidency, there is a Coordination Committee, headed by the Moncloa Chief of Staff. This committee includes the main senior officials of the Presidency.

== Most senior positions within the Office ==
Department	Current holder	Term start
Attached Department	Current holder	Term start
Prime Minister's Cabinet	Diego Rubio Rodríguez (CoS)	11 September 2024
Office of the Moncloa Deputy Chief of Staff	Ángel Alonso Arroba	25 September 2024
General Secretariat of the Prime Minister's Office	Judit Alexandra González	29 March 2023
General Secretariat for National Policy	José Fernández Albertos	25 September 2024
General Secretariat for Institutional Relations and Citizens	Ana Ruipérez Núñez	30 July 2025
Department of National Security	Loreto Gutiérrez Hurtado	29 November 2023
Department for European Affairs	Maider Makua García	10 January 2024
Department for Foreign Affairs	Pilar Sánchez-Bella Solís	28 November 2023
Office for Economic Affairs and G20	Manuel de la Rocha Vázquez	28 November 2023
Department for Strategic Projects and Sectoral Policies	María Antonia Scheifler Alácano	10 January 2024
Office of the Spokesperson of the Government	Pilar Alegría	21 November 2023
Secretariat of State for Press	Lydia del Canto	24 December 2024

== Headquarters ==
The meetings of the Council of Ministers were usually held in the palace where the monarch —who chaired the meetings— was staying. Thus, many ministerial meetings took place in the Royal Palace, but not always, since there was no fixed headquarters and they moved along with the royal court. However, starting in 1871, an official headquarters for the head of government was established. The chosen location was the Casa de los Heros, which served as such until its forced abandonment in 1910, due to its dilapidated condition. This building was demolished years after its abandonment, building in its place the current headquarters of the Ministry of Education.

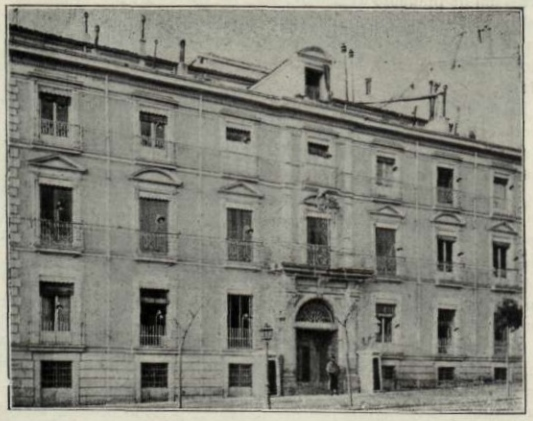
The Casa de los Heros, called at the time the Palace of the Presidency of the Council of Ministers for housing said Ministry between 1871 and 1910.

In 1914, during the reign of Alfonso XIII, the government purchased the Palace of Villamejor from Infante Carlos de Borbón-Dos Sicilias, who had owned it since 1906. The purchase was authorized by the Cortes Generales through the Law of June 30, 1914, which granted a credit of two million pesetas —US$0.372 million, equivalent to $11,971,254 in 2025— to the Presidency of the Council of Ministers, of which, 1.9 million were for the purchase of the property and the remaining 100,000 pesetas to cover the costs of moving and installing the prime-ministerial services. The prime-ministerial office, which had been temporarily housed in the Palace of Justice (Convent of the Salesas Reales) since 1910, moved to this new location in 1915.

The Presidency was housed in the aforementioned Villamejor Palace until 1977. At the end of 1976, when the democratic transition began, it was considered that, for security reasons, the Government Headquarters should be moved out of the city center and the historic Palace of Moncloa was chosen as the new headquarters. The Moncloa Palace had been rebuilt during the dictatorship, since the Civil War completely destroyed it and since the 1950s it had acted as the residence of foreign heads of state who visited the country.

Today, the Moncloa Palace serves only as the residence of the head of government and his family, as well as for official events, since the presidential services have been distributed among the different buildings that have been built around the palace since the 1980s. Currently, the Moncloa Government Complex consists of 16 buildings, and also houses the headquarters of the Ministry of the Presidency.

== Budget ==
In millions of euros (€)
1. Presidency of the Government 55.6 (41.5%)
2. Information coverage 78.4 (58.5%)

As it is not currently a ministerial department, the Office of the Prime Minister does not have its own budget section and it is financed mainly through the section of the Ministry of the Presidency, Justice and Relations with the Cortes.

Thus, for the fiscal year 2023, extended to 2026, the Office has a budget of 134 million euros, participating in two programs of the aforementioned Ministry:

- Program 912M "Presidency of the Government", endowed with 55.6 million euros, which covers the expenses of the Cabinet Office, the General Secretariat, the rest of the departments and the meetings of the Council of Ministers.
- Program 921Q "Information coverage", endowed with 78.4 million euros, which covers the expenses of the Secretariat of State for Press.
