= Cabinet Office (Spain) =

Government executive branch in Spain

- Gabinete de la Presidencia del Gobierno
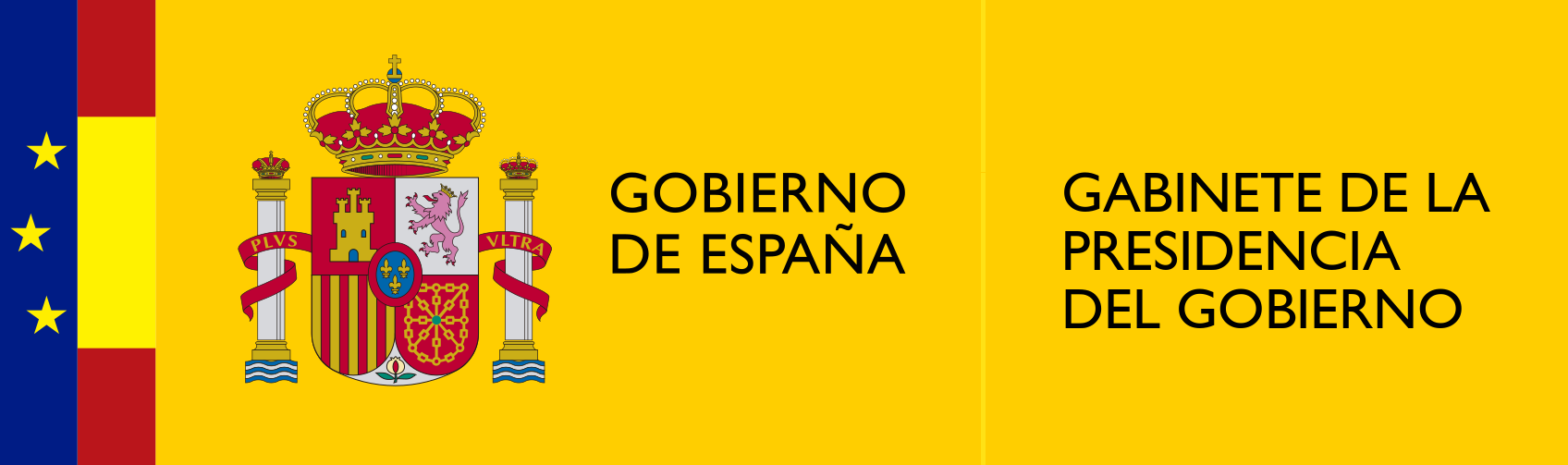

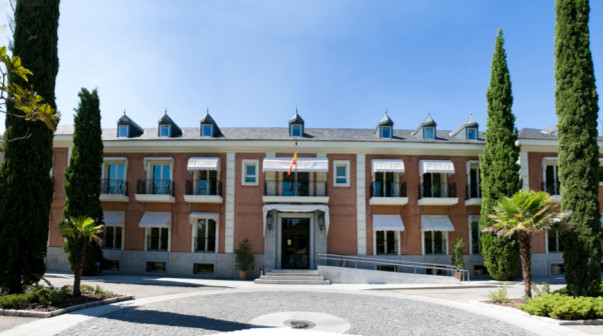
- Seeds Building, Moncloa, Madrid

Department overview
- Formed: July 19, 1976 (50 years ago)
- Preceding Department: Ministry of the Presidency
- Jurisdiction: Spain
- Headquarters: Palace of Moncloa, Madrid
- Ministers responsible: TMH Pedro Sánchez, Prime Minister; Diego Rubio Rodríguez, Chief of Staff
- Department executives: Ángel Alonso Arroba, Deputy Chief of Staff; Judit Alexandra González, Secretary-General

The Cabinet of the Prime Minister's Office, officially Cabinet of the Presidency of the Government, is a political and technical assistance body at the service of the Prime Minister of Spain. The Cabinet of the Prime Minister is composed of multiple departments directly responsible to the Premier and coordinated by the Chief of Staff. The Cabinet Office, the officials that work on it, their offices and the departments make up the Office of the Prime Minister.

== Responsibilities ==
The functions of the Cabinet of the Prime Minister's Office are freely established by the Prime Minister through a Royal Decree signed by the Monarch. The duties of the Cabinet Office are focused on assisting the chief executive while most responsibilities over Government coordination and Council of Ministers assistance are assumed by the Ministry of the Presidency.

The current duties are:

- To provide the Prime Minister with the political and technical information that is necessary for the exercise of the Prime Minister's Office.
- To advice the Prime Minister in the matters that the Prime Minister's Office deals with.
- To know the programs, plans and activities of the different ministerial departments, in order to facilitat the Prime Minister's duties as coordinator of the Government's action.
- To carry out the study and monitoring of all the programs and actions of the European Union that have an impact on the Spanish public policies, providing the necessary information for European decision-making.
- To know the public policies and programs adopted and developed by the regional governments, in order to facilitate cooperation and co-governance in all those matters that demand concurrent and concerted action.
- To facilitate communication with citizens and attend to and respond to all suggestions, complaints and information addressed to the Prime Minister.
- To advice the Prime Minister in matters related to national policy, international policy and economic policy.
- To advise the Prime Minister on matters of national security.
- To carry out any other activities or functions entrusted to it by the Prime Minister.

The Cabinet Office is also responsible for the security of the Prime Minister and the Minister of the Presidency and their families, protocol, human resources and Government healthcare, although these duties are carried out by the Secretary-General of the Prime Minister's Office.

== History ==
The Cabinet was created for the first time in 1976, with the arrival of Adolfo Suárez to the premiership. Despite having been created in 1976, the Cabinet Office wasn't officially regulated until September 1978. The Royal Decree was very short and it only said that the Cabinet was and advisory body to the Prime Minister with the functions that the Primer would like to grant to it.

With prime minister Felipe González the Cabinet Office grow up establishing new departments and functions like knowing the ministerial departments plans. Moreover, at this time the Secretary of State for Relations with the Cortes and the Office of the Spokesperson of the Government depended it from the Cabinet Office.

Prime minister José María Aznar elevated the rank of the Cabinet Office from Undersecretariat to Secretariat of State and continued boosting the Cabinet. Prime minister José Luis Rodrígez Zapatero didn't made many changes, with the exception of the creation of the Economic Office.

It was during the premiership of Mariano Rajoy when the Cabinet Office was granted with the powers that it has today. Most of the current departments were created at that time and in 2012 it granted the Cabinet responsibilities over national security by creating the Department of Homeland Security and granting the Deputy Chief of Staff the direction of the department. With Rajoy the Cabinet Office also received responsibilities over the Government communication policy by assuming the Secretariat of State for Press.

Prime minister Pedro Sánchez suppressed the Economic Office in 2018 and created in its place the Department for Economic Affairs. He also boosted the international matters by creating the General Secretariat for International Affairs, European Union, G20 and Global Security with rank of Undersecretariat in replace of the Department for International Affairs, that had rank of Directorate-General. Finally, he gave more autonomy to the Department of National Security by separating the offices of Deputy Chief of Staff and Director of the Homeland Security Department in two different officials.

== High-officials ==
The high-officials of the Cabinet are directly nominated by the Prime Minister and appointed by the Monarch.

Official	Office	Portfolio
Diego Rubio Rodríguez	Chief of Staff	With rank of Secretary of State, the Chief of Staff is responsible for supervising and coordinating all the departments of the Cabinet Office and it is the main adviser to the Prime Minister over political matters. In general, it is in charge of exercising the functions entrusted to the Cabinet Office.
Ángel Alonso Arroba	Deputy Chief of Staff	Exercising the functions that the Chief of Staff entrust to; helping with the coordination of the Cabinet Office. It has rank of Under-Secretary.
Judit Alexandra González Pedraz	Secretary-General	Prime Minister agenda; security; protocol; Cabinet Office domestic tasks such as HR, media, finance, health, etc. It has rank of Under-Secretary.
José Fernández Albertos	Secretary-General for National Policy	Assisting the Prime Minister on political planning. It has rank of Under-Secretary.
Ana Ruipérez Núñez	Secretary-General for Institutional Relations and Citizens	It coordinates the services of the Prime Minister's Office related to institutional relations and citizen services.
Loreto Gutiérrez Hurtado (BG)	Director of the National Security Department	Advising the Prime Minister on National Security matters; Assisting the National Security Council; Government communications; Keeping the bunker of the Palace running and in good condition. It has rank of Director-General.
Maider Makua García	Director of the European Affairs Department	It advises and assists the prime minister on matters relating to the European Union and bilateral relations with European countries.
Pilar Sánchez-Bella Solís	Director of the Foreign Affairs Department	Responsible for advicing and assisting the Prime Minister in matters related to his international activity, foreign relations, multilateral and global affairs. Likewise, it is in charge of the preparation and monitoring of international summits and meetings in which the Prime Minister participates. It has rank of Under-Secretary.

== Current departments ==
The current Prime Minister Pedro Sánchez structured its personal Cabinet in the following way:

Palace of Moncloa logo.

=== Office of the Chief of Staff ===
The Office of the Chief of Staff is composed by the Moncloa Chief of Staff and its advisers.

=== Office of the Deputy Chief of Staff ===
The Office of the Deputy Chief of Staff is composed by the Deputy Chief of Staff and four departments:

- The Department of National Security.
- The Department for Strategic Foresight and Scientific Advice.
  - The National Foresight and Strategy Office.
  - The National Scientific Advisory Office.
- The Department for Cultural Affairs.
- The Department for Speech

==== Department of National Security ====
The Department of National Security, created in 2012 and regulated by the National Security Act of 2015, is the department of the Cabinet Office responsible for collecting and analysing information of interest for national security and advising the Prime Minister on such matters.

The Director of the Department was, until 2018, the Deputy Chief of Staff of the Cabinet. The director is a member of the National Security Council along with the Chief of Staff.

The headquarters of the department are located in the bunker of the Palace of Moncloa.

=== General Secretariat ===
Prime Minister's Office Department of Security emblem.

Led by the Secretary-General of the Prime Minister's Office, the General Secretariat duties are:

- Organizating and security of the activities of the Prime Minister, both in the national territory and in their movements abroad.
- Coordinating of the support activities and protocol to the Prime Minister in its relationship with the remaining powers of the State.
- Assisting to the different bodies of the Prime Minister's Office in matters of economic administration, personnel, maintenance and conservation, information and communication means.
- Coordinating of logistics programs and devices for travel abroad by Spanish Government Authorities.
- Supervising of the Health Operating System of the Prime Minister's Office.
- Executing those other activities or functions entrusted to it by the Premier.

The General Secretariat is composed by three departments:

- The Department for Technical and Legal Coordination. It assists the Secretary-General; it coordinates the media of both Prime Minister's Office and Ministry of the Presidency; it assists the Press Offices of the State High Officials and it develops the transparency policy.
- The Department for Security. It is responsible for the security of the Palace of Moncloa, the Prime Minister, the Deputy Prime Minister, the Ministers, their families and other officials and buildings that the Chief of Staff considers to need protection.
- The Department for Protocol. It coordinates the travels of the Prime Minister and the Deputy Prime Minister; it organizes the meetings of the Prime Minister in the national territory with national or international authorities and it coordinates the protocol.

Because they share assistance duties to the Prime Minister, both Secretary-General and Undersecretary of the Presidency coordinate together their work.

=== General Secretariat for National Policy ===
The General Secretariat for Political Planning carries out advisory, support and reinforcement functions in the development of the Government's political program.

The General Secretariat is composed by four departments:

- The Department for Public Policies.
- The Department for Territorial Analysis.
- The Department for Political and Social Innovation.
- The Department for Political Coordination.

=== General Secretariat for Institutional Relations and Citizens ===
It coordinates the Prime Minister's Office relations with other institutions and with citizens.

It has one department:

- The Department for Institutional Affairs.

=== Office for Economic Affairs and G20 ===
With the rank of secretariat of state, it assists the prime minister on economic policy.

It has one department:

- The Department for Strategic Projects and Sector Policies.
