= Pío Cabanillas =

Pío Cabanillas may refer to:

- Pío Cabanillas Gallas (1923–1991), Spanish minister of Information and Tourism between 1974 and 1975 and Minister of Justice between 1981 and 1982.
- Pío Cabanillas Alonso (1958–), spokesperson minister of the Spanish government between 2000 and 2002.
