= Diego Rubio =

Diego Rubio may refer to:

- Diego Rubio (politician) (born 1986), Spanish scholar and policy maker
- Diego Rubio (cyclist) (born 1991), Spanish cyclist
- Diego Rubio (footballer) (born 1993), Chilean footballer
