= Rosa Conde =

Spanish sociologist and politician

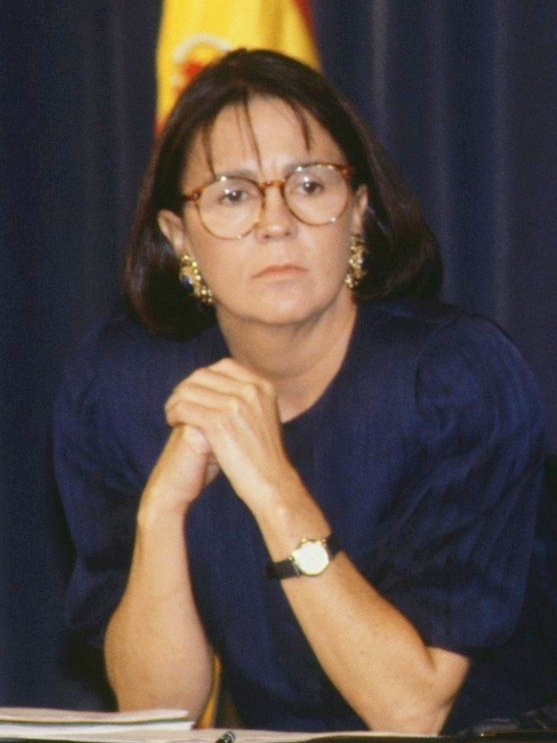
- Rosa Conde in 1989
- Born: 7 September 1947 (age 79); Ronda, Spain

Rosa Conde Gutiérrez del Álamo (born 7 September 1947) is a Spanish sociologist and politician. She served as Spokesperson of the Government from 1988 and 1993 and as Member of the Congress of Deputies from 1989 to 2004 representing Madrid.

== Biography ==
Conde was born in Ronda, Spain in 1947. She took her degree and later taught at Complutense University of Madrid. She became the Spokesperson of the Spanish Government from 11 July 1988 until July 13, 1993, under the premiership of Felipe González. She took over from Javier Solana and operated at a ministerial level. After 1993, she continued serving the Premier as Secretary-General within the Cabinet Office.

After that she became the Director of the Carolina Foundation which is the body responsible for improving relations with Spanish speaking South America. She served from 2004 until 2012.

== Quotas ==
Conde was one of the first two women to be part of a socialist government placed her squarely at the center of the debate that some feminists within the Spanish Socialist Workers' Party (PSOE) were championing within the party regarding the absence of women in political representation and institutions. At that time, Conde publicly opposed quotas, unlike Matilde Fernández , who also joined González 's cabinet and was one of the promoters of the internal feminist campaign. This campaign succeeded in having the 32nd Federal Congress of the PSOE in 1990 approve not only the creation of a mandatory 25% quota for women in party and institutional positions, but also the creation of a secretariat for women's affairs. Later, Conde supported quotas.
