= National Office of Foresight & Strategy (Spain) =

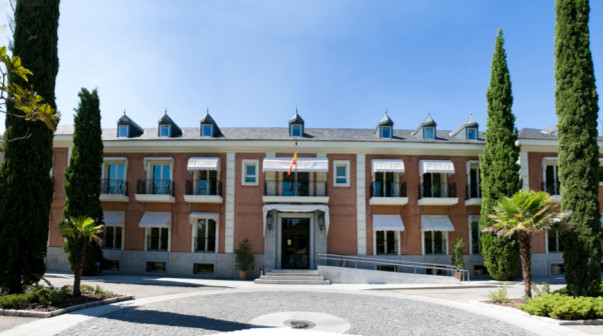

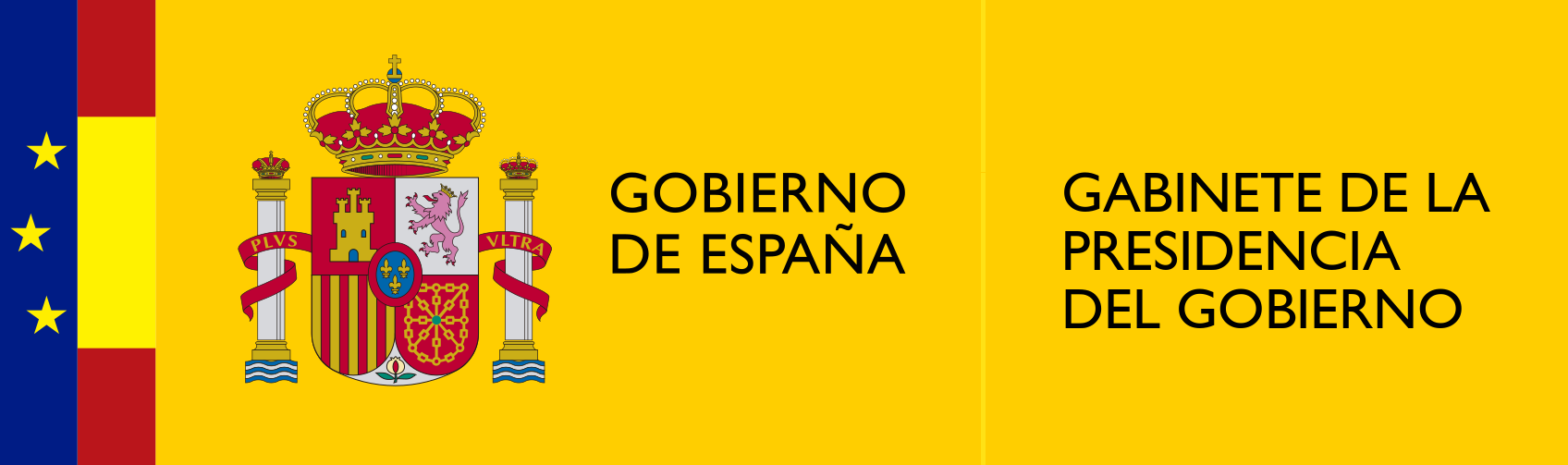

Agency overview
- Formed: 28 January 2020
- Jurisdiction: Government of Spain
- Agency executives: Pedro Sánchez; Diego Rubio Rodríguez
- Parent department: Cabinet Office (Spain)
- Website: www.futuros.gob.es

The National Office of Foresight & Strategy (Oficina Nacional de Prospectiva y Estrategia in Spanish) is a unit of the Presidency of the Government of Spain responsible for studying and planning the future of the country in the medium- and long-term. It is also a member of the EU-wide foresight network led by the European Commission.

== Mandate and structure ==
The Office was created in January 2020 by President Pedro Sánchez to address myopic bias, foster anticipatory thinking in government, and protect the strategic interests of Spain over the coming decades. The Office is based in the Prime Minister's Office, at the Palace of Moncloa. It has a Director General and a multidisciplinary team of researchers that includes economists, political scientists, sociologists, legal scholars, and environmental scientists. The official mandate of the Office is to "systematically analyze empirical evidence available to identify possible (demographic, economic, geopolitical, environmental, and societal) challenges and opportunities that Spain will encounter in the medium- and long-term, and to help the country prepare for them”.

== Actions ==
During the coronavirus pandemic, the Office studied the different epidemiological, economic, and social scenarios that could emerge after the outbreak of COVID-19 and designed the country's “exit-plan” out of the lockdown.

In May 2021, the Office presented Spain 2050, the "most ambitious" strategic foresight study carried out to date in Spain. It was crafted by a hundred renowned academics from different disciplines, ages and political sign. The study sets nine social, economic, and environmental goals that Spain should achieve to catch-up to the most advanced countries in the European Union by 2050 and proposes 200 policy measures to achieve that goal. The goals are based on an integrated analysis of 500 data series and 1,650 scientific publications.

The project attracted a great deal of attention in the media and from the general public, becoming a trending topic on Twitter in Spain for several days. The conservative parties (PP and Vox) and newspapers described it as a "smokescreen" that "only seeks to distract" and criticized many of its measures, such as its suggestion to increase public spending and immigration, and its invitation to undertake bold measures to tackle climate change. By contrast, Spain 2050 was praised by academia, industry, and the left-wing media, which applauded its “scientific rigor” and honesty in "addressing the great problems" of the nation. The European Commission described the project as an “excellent example of how we should approach the use of strategic foresight, and a major contribution to our joint foresight efforts in Europe.” The newspaper El País considered it a "useful" and "healthy initiative to energize public debate" and "push our country in a better direction." El Confidencial described it as a "solid and timely work” and La Vanguardia concluded that it was “ambitious (…) stimulating and hopeful.”

Between September and December 2021, the Office organized the Dialogues on the Future, a "great national conversation," according to Prime Minister Sánchez, aimed at expanding the strategic conclusions to all citizens and at promoting plural and informed conversations on the future of Spain in the post-Covid world. The Dialogues were held in 17 cities, one in each of the autonomous regions in Spain, and consisted of a hundred meetings, roundtables, and civil workshops that involved more than 25,000 people, in person or online. A total of 75 institutions and 550 speakers participated, including 30 vice-presidents, Commissioners and senior officials of the European Union; 93 senior officials from local, regional and national governments; 70 CEOs, 110 academics, 40 journalists and several trade union representatives, as well as activists and leaders of the civil society.

The European Commission described the Spanish Dialogues on the Future as a “wonderful example of transforming the way we are engaging with citizens” and claimed that they set a “new standard when it comes to the engagement of a wide range of actors at the local, regional, national and European levels.”

== International counterparts ==
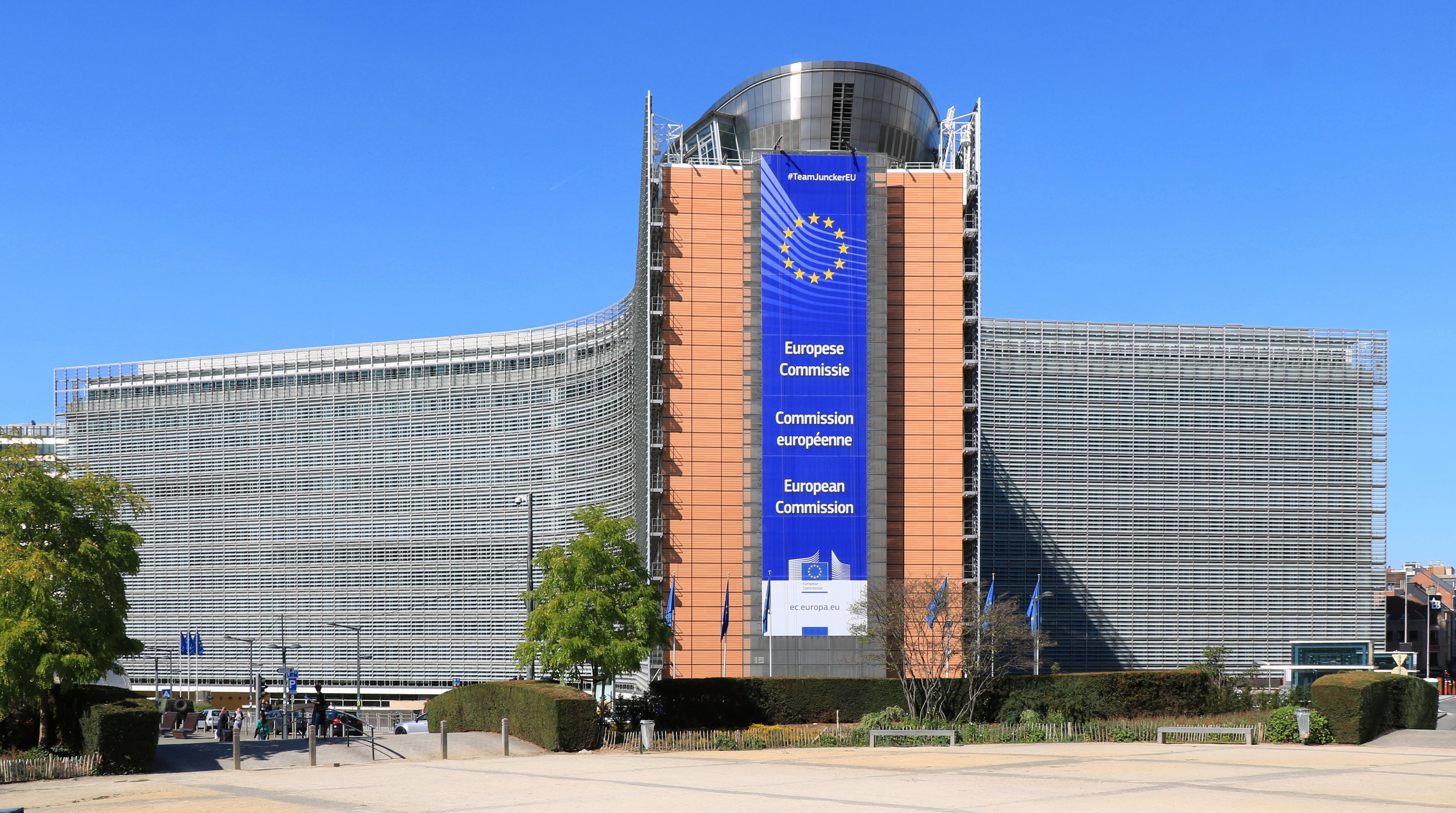
Berlaymont building, head office of the European Commission

Other countries have similar foresight offices, including: Canada (Policy Horizons), France (France Stratégie ), Finland (Foresight Unit), United Kingdom (Foresight Office) and Singapore (Centre for Strategic Futures). International organizations such as the European Commission, the European Parliament, the OECD, and the United Nations also have units dedicated to foresight and strategic thinking.
