= Secretary of State for Press =

Secretariat of State of Spain

- Secretario de Estado de Comunicación
- Moncloa Palace's logo

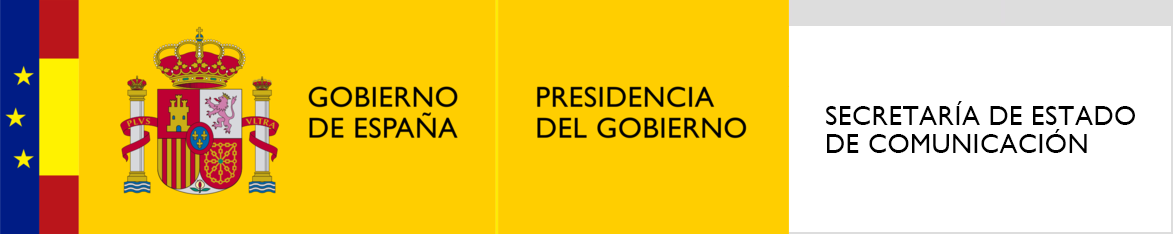

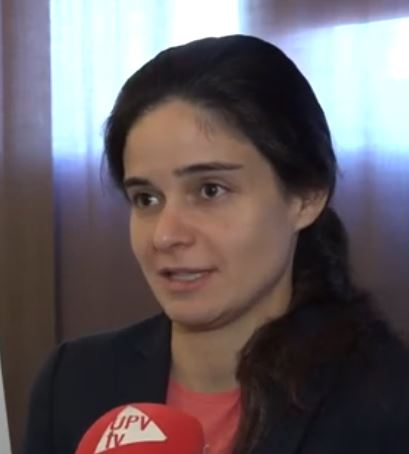
- Incumbent; Lydia del Canto since December 24, 2024
- Office of the Prime Minister
- Style: The Most Excellent (formal); Mr./Ms. Secretary of State (informal)
- Member of: Foreign Policy Executive Council
- Reports to: The Prime Minister; The Government Spokesperson
- Nominator: The Prime Minister
- Appointer: The Monarch
- Formation: September 1, 1978; 48 years ago
- First holder: Manuel Ortiz Sánchez
- Website: La Moncloa

The secretary of state for press, also known as secretary of state for communication, is a senior minister of the Spanish Prime Minister's Office responsible for the government's communication policy. This position must not to be confused with the Spokesperson of the Government, which is normally one of the Cabinet ministers.

Unlike what happens in other countries, the secretary of state is not responsible for appearing before the media, but is responsible for collecting national and international information and advising the prime minister and the spokesperson on how to use it. It is also responsible for coordinating the rest of the Administration's press departments, both inside and outside the country.

It depends functionally on the spokesperson, who is usually a minister or an official with the rank of minister who is in charge of appearing before the media. The current position was created in 1978, however, the history of the press department dates back to 1910s.

== Functions ==
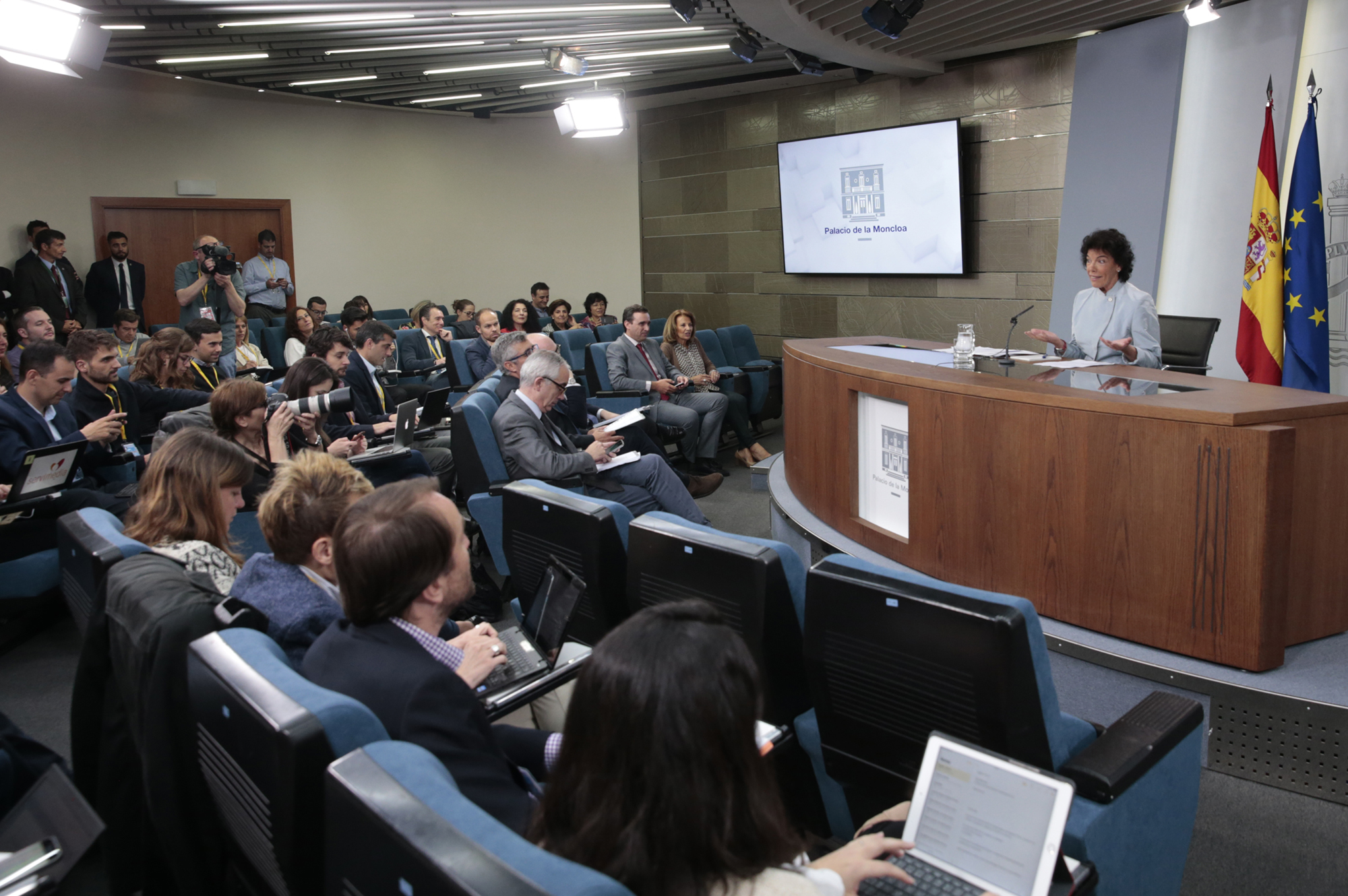
Moncloa Palace' Briefing Room

The Secretary of State is in charge of:

- The coordination of the information policy of the central government and the elaboration of the criteria for its determination, as well as the promotion and coordination of the institutional communication policy of the State.
- The elaboration and diffusion of the communiqués of the Government and its Prime Minister and the review of the activities of the Council of Ministers.
- The summary of the activities of the Council of Ministers.
- The direction of the information services of the General State Administration in Spain and abroad.
- Relations with the media, as well as the analysis of the national and international conjuncture.
- The organization of the national, regional and international coverage of government activity.
- Attendance at the activities and public appearances of the prime minister, both in national territory and abroad.
- The support to the Commission for Advertising and Institutional Communication.
- The management of communication in situations of national emergencies.
- The analysis of current legislation on information and the proposal of improvement measures .

== Organization ==
From the secretary of state depends:

Secretariat of State Organization (2026)
Secretary of State	Cabinet
Secretary of State	Unit for Support
Secretary of State	Unit for Information Logistics
Department for National Information	Unit for National Information
Department for National Information	Unit for Economic Information
Department for International Information	Deputy Directorate-General for International Information
Department for Regional Information	Deputy Directorate-General for Regional Information
Digital Department	Unit for Digital Information
Digital Department	Unit for Development
Digital Department	Deputy Directorate-General for Analysis and Documentation
Department for Information Coordination	Unit for Institutional Coordination
Department for Institutional Communication	Unit for Institutional Advertising

The press departments of the Spanish diplomatic missions depend from the secretary of state. All administrative bodies of the General State Administration with responsibilities in mass media relations depend from the secretary of state, with the exception of the Diplomatic Information Office of the Ministry of Foreign Affairs.

== List of secretaries of state ==
1. Manuel Ortiz Sánchez (1978–1979)
2. Josep Meliá Pericás (1979–1980)
3. Rosa Posada Chapado (1980–1981)
4. Ignacio Aguirre Borrell (1981–1982)
5. Eduardo Sotillos Palet (1982–1985)
6. Santiago Varela Díaz (1985–1988)
7. Miguel Gil Peral (1993–1996)
8. Miguel Ángel Rodríguez Bajón (1996–1998)
9. Pedro Antonio Martín Marín (1998–2000)
10. Alfredo Timermans del Olmo (2002–2004)
11. Miguel Barroso Ayats (2004–2005)
12. Fernando Moraleda Quílez (2005–2008)
13. Nieves Goicoechea (2008–2010)
14. Félix Monteira de la Fuente (2010–2011)
15. Carmen Martínez Castro (2011–2018)
16. Miguel Ángel Oliver (2018–2021)
17. Francesc Vallès Vives (2021–2024)
18. Ion Antolín Llorente (2024)
19. Lydia del Canto (2024–present)
