= Carmen Martínez Castro =

Spanish journalist

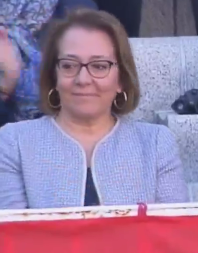

Secretary of State for Press
- In office 26 December 2011 – 9 June 2018
- Preceded by: Félix Monteira
- Succeeded by: Miguel Ángel Oliver

Personal details
- Born: 1961 (age 64–65) Caracas, Venezuela
- Education: Complutense University of Madrid
- Occupation: Journalist
- Awards: Grand Cross of the Order of Civil Merit (2018)

Carmen Martínez Castro (born 1961) is a Venezuelan-born Spanish journalist who was the Secretary of State for Press in the Spanish Ministry of the Presidency from 2011 to 2018.

== Career ==
Martínez has a degree in Information Sciences from the Complutense University of Madrid. She then worked at Radio 80 and Antena 3 Radio. Later, she was a columnist for ABC and La Razón, as well as a contributor to the television programs El Primer Café and La Responder (Antena 3) and El Debate de la Primera (TVE). She has also been deputy director of the radio programs of La Linterna and La Mañana (COPE) and Herrera en la Onda (Onda Cero). She was also the director of La Brújula and the midday newscast of Onda Cero.

On 5 May 2018, in the context of a public act of Prime Minister Mariano Rajoy in Alicante, Martínez, who was present at the entrance of the act, privately criticized the protesters in favor of the increase in pensions who were protesting there with a "Make you want to cut your sleeves and say fuck you", words that were captured by a nearby recording, which would go viral. The comment was the subject of a wide controversy collected by most of the Spanish media. Later, Martínez apologized for her comments.
