= Diego Rubio (politician) =

Spanish politician and scholar

His excellency Diego Rubio
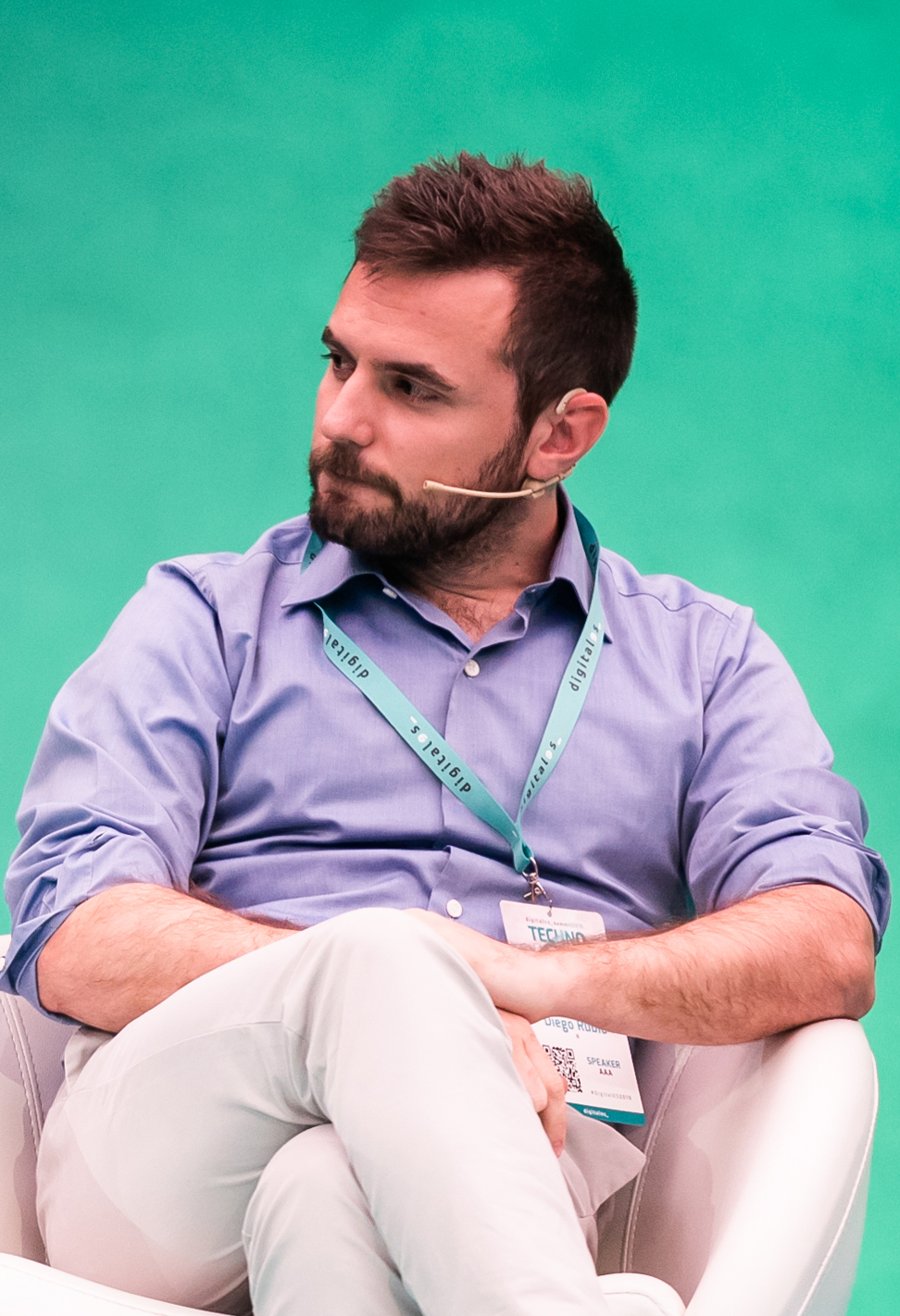

13th Moncloa Chief of Staff
- Incumbent
- Assumed office 11 September 2024
- Monarch: Felipe VI
- Prime Minister: Pedro Sánchez
- Preceded by: Óscar López Águeda

Secretary-General for Public Policy and European Affairs
- In office 29 November 2023 – 11 September 2024
- Prime Minister: Pedro Sánchez
- Preceded by: Office established
- Succeeded by: Office abolished

Director of the National Office for Foresight and Strategy
- In office 5 February 2020 – 29 November 2023
- Prime Minister: Pedro Sánchez
- Preceded by: Office established
- Succeeded by: María Sara Baliña Vieites

Personal details
- Born: Diego Rubio Rodríguez Cáceres, Spain
- Party: Independent
- Education: PhD
- Alma mater: University of Oxford; Columbia University; École normale supérieure Autonomous University of Barcelona

Diego Rubio Rodríguez (born 1986) is a Spanish scholar and policy maker, currently serving as the Moncloa Chief of Staff under Pedro Sánchez. Prior to that, he was Secretary-General of Public Policy, European Affairs, and Strategic Foresight.

== Career ==
Rubio was born in Cáceres, a mid-size city of Western Spain, in 1986. He graduated in History from the Autonomous University of Barcelona with the best academic record of the country, for which he obtained the National Award for Academic Excellence, the most prestigious recognition in higher-education granted by the Spanish State. He then obtained a master's degree from the École Normale Supérieure de Lettres et Sciences Humaines, and a PhD from the University of Oxford. He also studied at Sorbonne University and Columbia University as visiting scholar.

In 2015, Rubio became a stipendiary lecturer and a junior research fellow at the University of Oxford, affiliated with Magdalen College and The Queen's College. He taught at the Faculty of History and was an associate member of the Department of Politics and International Relations. Two of his doctoral advisors were Sir John Elliott and Sir Noel Malcolm. In 2018, Rubio was appointed professor of Applied History and Government at IE University, where he founded and directed the Center for Governance of Change, described by Public as one of Europe's leading institutions in technological foresight. During this period, he also advised several international organizations, including the United Nations, the European Commission, and the Ibero-American General Secretariat.

In 2020, Prime Minister Pedro Sánchez appointed Rubio director of Spain's National Office for Foresight and Strategy with the mandate of "analyzing future trends and preparing the country to face them". In this capacity, Rubio crafted several policies, designed the national COVID-19 lockdown exit plan, and led the creation of grand strategies such as Spain 2050, which set out the structural transformations the country needed to undertake in the long term, and Resilient EU2030, the collective blueprint to promote the strategic autonomy of the 27 European Union member states. His work was described as “a major contribution” by the European Commission and as “a positive spin on Europe’s ability to shape this world” by Politico.

In 2023, Rubio was promoted to the rank of Secretary-General for Public Policy, European Affairs and Strategic Foresight, responsible for coordinating the policy work of all ministries and for the diplomatic relation with all European governments and EU institutions. In this role, he was one of the main architects of the Spanish Presidency of the Council of the European Union, and Spain's lead negotiator for the second von der Leyen Commission. He also fostered the creation of Spain's National Scientific Advisory Office, an agency inspired in the UK's Government Office for Science.

In 2024, Pedro Sánchez appointed Rubio his Chief of Staff and first Secretary of State praising "his integrity, technical rigour and cross-cutting vision." Sánchez also included him in the National Security Council, the principal advisory body for considerations of national security and foreign policy matters. Rubio undertook a deep reform of La Moncloa, the President's Office headquarters, creating new directorates and increasing its staff to 700 people. He incorporated numerous scholars from top universities and introduced Artificial Intelligence agents to improve socio-economic analysis, boost productivity, and monitor the public debate on social media. During his tenure, Rubio co-designed several public policies, and had to manage several critical situations like the floods of Valencia and the 2025 general blackout. He also negotiated with NATO Spain's opt out of the 5% defence spending target, and spearheaded his government’s efforts to regulate social media and limit the power of Elon Musk and other tech billionaires.

According to media reports, Rubio placed in his office a white canvas with black lettering that stated “History has not yet been invented”.

== Research and outreach ==
Rubio's work focuses on applied history, theory of change, foresight and anticipatory governance. His research aims to understand how societies change over time, paying special attention to issues such as causality and contingency, path dependencies, megatrends, black swans, and the effects of technological innovation and geopolitical transformations. His ideas have been featured in several media outlets, including the BBC, El País, La Repubblica, and TVE.

In 2019, Rubio wrote and hosted A History of the Future, a four-episodes documentary series for the History Channel in which he explores the future of work, democracy, globalization, and climate, along with 18 leading academics, including Timothy Snyder (Yale), Erik Brynjolfsson (MIT), Naomi Oreskes (Harvard), Graham Allison (Harvard), Carl Benedikt Frey (Oxford), Steven Levitsky (Harvard), Rana Mitter (Oxford), and César Hidalgo (MIT).

In 2022, Rubio co-wrote and co-directed 2050, a 20-episode podcast series on the social, economic, technological, and environmental changes that might take place in the coming decades. The series featured 120 experts. It was produced by The Story Lab, and it was released on Spotify, Apple Podcasts, and Amazon Music.

Rubio speaks Spanish, English, French, and Italian.
