= Eduardo Sotillos =

Spanish journalist and politician

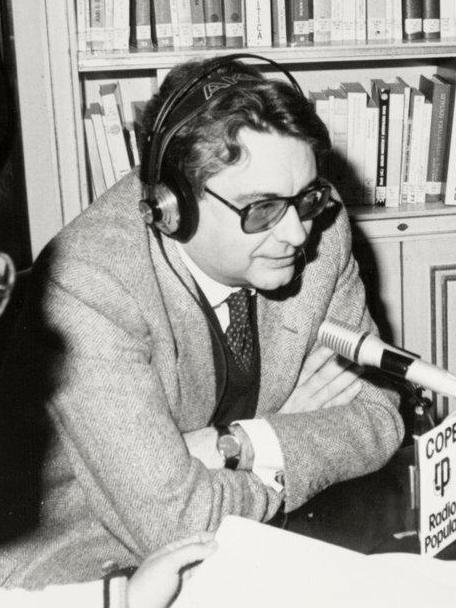
Sotillos in 1982

Eduardo Sotillos Palet (born March 27, 1940) is a Spanish journalist and politician. He served as Spokesperson of the Government of Spain between 1982 and 1985.

== Biography ==
Born on 27 March 1940 in Madrid. He was the director of Radio Nacional de España (RNE) during the Spanish transition to democracy. He was also the RNE's corresponde to Lisbon and Press Chief of José María de Areilza. Director of the Telediario in Televisión Española, he affiliated to the Spanish Socialist Workers' Party (PSOE) in 1979.

Following the victory of the PSOE in the 1982 general election he was appointed as Spokesperson of the Government of Spain, serving until 1985.

He was municipal councillor in Pozuelo de Alarcón from 1991 to 1994.

He left the PSOE circa 2015.

== Awards ==
- Premio APM de Honor (1997)

Political offices
Preceded by Ignacio Aguirre	Spokesperson of the Government of Spain; 1982–1985	Succeeded by Javier Solana
