= National Award for Excellence in Academic Performance (Spain) =

Spanish national academic award

Presentation ceremony for the 2013–2014 National University Graduation Awards.

The National Award for Excellence in Academic Performance (known in Spanish as "Premios Nacionales de Fin de Carrera de Educación Universitaria" since 2012, as "Premios Nacionales a la Excelencia en el Rendimiento Académico Universitario" from 2009 to 2011, and as "Premios Nacionales de Fin de Carrera" prior to 2009) is the most prestigious award granted by the Ministry of Education (Government of Spain) to the students that have just accomplished their undergraduate degree outstanding greatly among the rest of students. It is one of the oldest academic awards continuously granted, with a history that goes back to the 19th century.

Prior to the academic year 2008-09, the award was granted to the students who had the highest average score in their correspondent degree (one award for each degree) e.g. Medicine, English Studies, Geology, etc. However, since 2009 every candidate compete in one of the five field categories: Arts and Humanities, Social and Legal Sciences, Sciences, Health Sciences and Engineering and Architecture. Each category counts with a variable number of National Awards (1st prize), Honorable Mentions (2nd prize) and "Accésits" (3rd prize). Therefore, the winners of these awards are not only recognized for being the best students on their degree, but the best students on their field category in the country.

In order to be elected as candidate the minimum average score is 9 (out of 10) in the fields of Arts and Humanities, Social and Legal Sciences, Sciences, Health Sciences and 8 in Engineering and Architecture. Achieving these minimum average grade in the Spanish Academic system is a major undertaking, therefore only a reduced number of students can apply for the award. The average score of the candidates is weighted with the class score of their promotion (diminishing differences between universities). Finally, the curriculum vitae of the candidates is also taken into account.

The awards are given by the Minister of Education, Culture and Sport in an official act in the National Auditorium of Music endowing the students 3300 euros for the 1st prize, 2650 euros for the second prize and 2200 euros for the 3rd.

== See also ==
- Award for Excellence in Academic Career (university)
