= Spokesperson of the Government of Spain =

Spanish government position

Spokesperson of the Government
- Logo of the Palace of La Moncloa

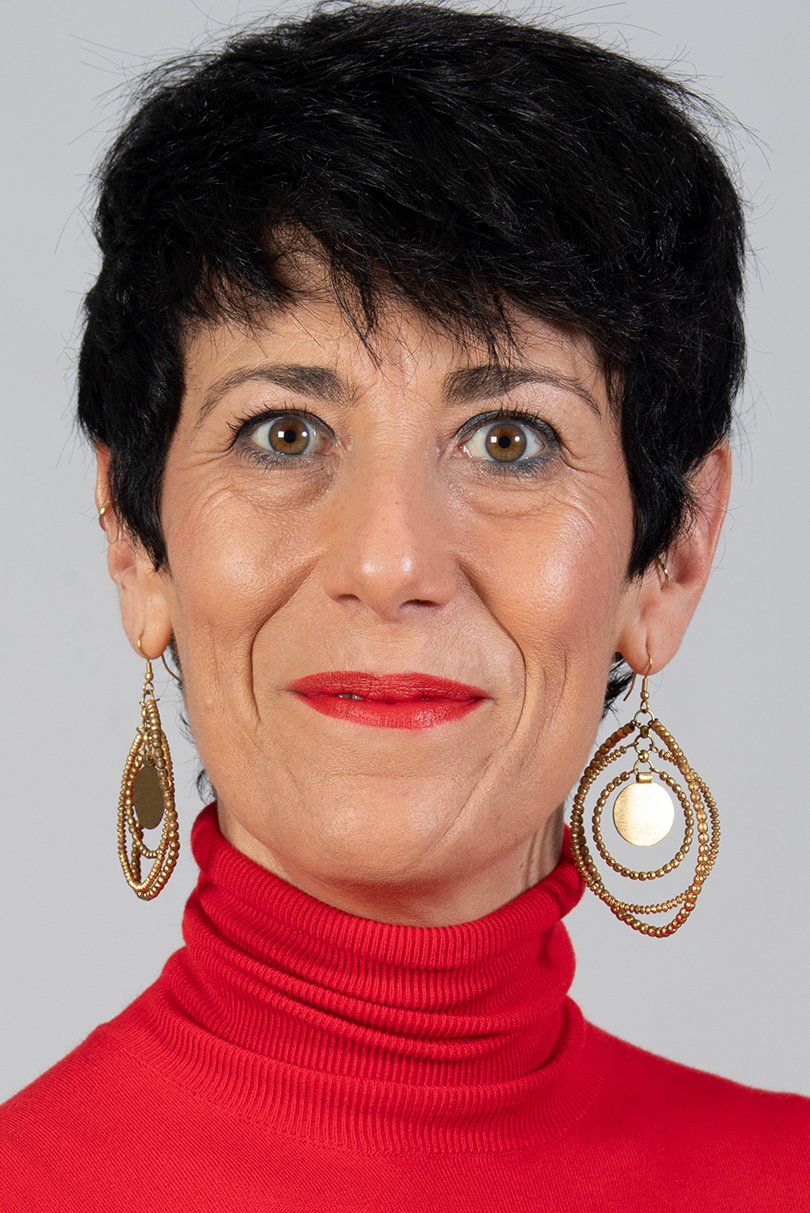
- Incumbent; Elma Saiz since 22 December 2025
- Office of the Prime Minister
- Style: The Most Excellent (formal); Mr. Spokesperson (informal)
- Member of: Council of Ministers
- Nominator: The Prime Minister
- Appointer: The Monarch
- Formation: September 1, 1978; 48 years ago
- First holder: Manuel Ortiz Sánchez
- Deputy: Secretary of State of Press

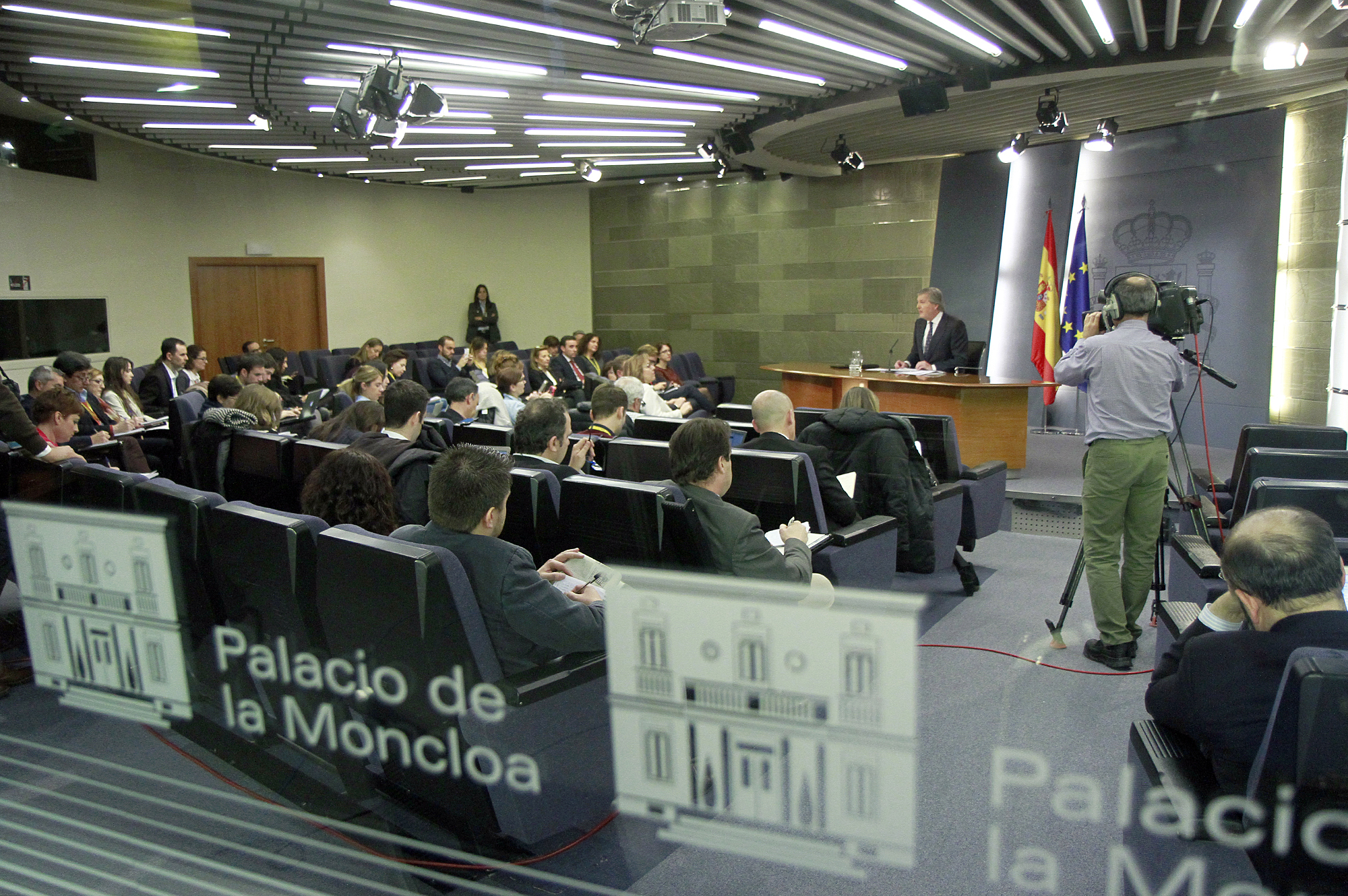
Moncloa Palace's Press Room

The spokesperson of the government (Spanish: Portavoz del Gobierno) is a position in the Government of Spain whose purpose is to inform and communicate political and institutional activities of the government to the public. The spokesperson—who currently holds the rank of minister—is based at the Moncloa Palace.

== History ==
In Spain, the starting point of relations between the government and the press, as well as with the general public, dates back to the premiership of José Canalejas y Méndez, in the early 1910s.

During this time, Canalejas established the custom now known as "información en corro" or "corrillo" (Note: According to the Royal Spanish Academy, información en corro or simply, a corrillo means "to gather in circle to argue and talk, separate from the rest of the people".), gathering journalists daily in his office to tell them the news. This practice, which from the beginning was understood as a way to influence the press so that it would write about what the government wanted or, if necessary, make corrections to the day's news, was continued by some prime ministers like Eduardo Dato, and rejected by others like the Count of Romanones.

At the same time as these meetings were taking place, since the beginning of the 1900s another custom had been established, that of providing the press with an "unofficial note or reference", which is what is known today as the "reference of the Council of Ministers".

=== First communication bodies ===
Over the years, the task of informing the public became institutionalized, an example of which was the creation in 1918 of an Information Office within the Ministry of Public Instruction and Fine Arts, whose purpose was "to communicate to the Press the information previously authorized by the Minister, Undersecretary and Directors-General".

Under the dictatorship of Miguel Primo de Rivera, the Press Information and Censorship Office was created within the Prime Minister's Office, later renamed the Press Information and Censorship Cabinet. Lieutenant Colonel Pedro Rico Parada was appointed to head this body within days and, after two years, Eduardo Hernández Vida (known by his pseudonym Celedonio de la Iglesia) was appointed, a position he held until the end of the dictatorship. Although these two men occasionally spoke to the press, the de facto spokesperson was General Adolfo Vallespinosa, who typically communicated the Council of Ministers' decisions and provided press coverage of the meetings. Despite this, communication remained highly personal, as before, with the head of the Executive—Primo de Rivera—routinely providing information to the press. After the dictator's fall, the new prime minister, General Berenguer, changed the head of the Press Office several times, but again, the de facto spokesman was someone else, this time Ricardo Ruiz y Benítez de Lugo.

During the Second Republic, a Press Section attached to the General Secretariat of the President of the Republic was created (1932), headed by prominent figures such as Emilio Herrero Mazorra. However, the Prime Minister refused to allow journalists to request information at the Presidential Palace and asked them to go to the headquarters of the Prime Minister's Office or the relevant Ministry, although they were eventually provided with a place to work in the palace to avoid miscoordination. At the end, the main channel of communication with the public was the under-secretary of the presidency, as well as each minister gave their opinion upon entering and leaving the Council of Ministers meetings. Later, during Largo Caballero's premiership and in the midst of the Civil War, the Ministry of Propaganda was created, which centralized all internal and external information bodies, although it was abolished a few months later.

=== Minister-Spokesperson ===
In the early years of the dictatorship of Francisco Franco, information and press policies fell under the Ministry of the Interior, led by Ramón Serrano Suñer. However, in 1941 these policies were placed under the control of the FET y de las JONS, through the Deputy Secretary for Popular Education, although, four years later they would return to the State Administration, through the Under-Secretary for Popular Education, integrated into the Ministry of National Education.

Later, the Ministry of Information and Tourism was created (1951), a government department responsible for controlling information, press and radio, as well as censorship. It was also responsible for tourism, an industry that experienced significant growth during those years. For the first eleven years, this department was headed by Gabriel Arias-Salgado, who had previously served as Deputy Secretary for Popular Education between 1941 and 1945. This ministry centralized and dictated the communication policy, disseminating reports from the Council of Ministers to the media, and its head acted as the de facto spokesperson of the government, a role that became more pronounced during the premiership of Carlos Arias Navarro.

The return to democracy required more communication to the public about the government's work, which made it necessary to formally establish the role of spokesperson. After the Ministry of Information and Tourism, the next highest body of the Spanish Communication Administration was the Information Services Office, created in October 1977 within the Prime Minister's Office. In September 1978, this Office was abolished and all communication bodies were grouped into a new Secretariat of State for Information, whose head, for the first time, was assigned the role of government spokesperson.

In 1982, with the arrival of the Socialist Party to power, the State Secretariat was transformed into the Office of the Government Spokesperson, headed by Eduardo Sotillos. In 1985, he was replaced by Javier Solana, Minister of Culture, who would alternate between both responsibilities. However, in 1988 the prime minister Felipe González, decided to give ministerial rank to the Spokesperson's Office, creating the Ministry of the Government Spokesperson, whose first head was Rosa Conde. With her dismissal in 1993, the ministry was unified with the Ministry of the Presidency, then headed by Alfredo Pérez Rubalcaba.

Since then, with the exceptions of Miguel Ángel Rodríguez Bajón, Secretary of State for Communication, and Pío Cabanillas Alonso, who was a minister without portfolio, the rest of the government spokespersons have been ministers in charge of a ministerial department, assisted at all times by the Secretary of State for Press.

== List of government spokespersons ==
Name (B.–D..)		Term			Position	Government		Ref.
Name (B.–D..)		Start	End	Duration	Position	Prime Minister	Monarch	Ref.
	Manuel Ortiz Sánchez (1934–2017)	1 September 1978	18 May 1979	259 days	Secretary of State for Press	Adolfo Suárez (1976–1981)	Juan Carlos I (1975–2014)	
	Josep Meliá Pericás (1939–2000)	18 May 1979	17 October 1980	1 year, 152 days	Secretary of State for Press	Adolfo Suárez (1976–1981)	Juan Carlos I (1975–2014)	
	Rosa Posada (1940–2014)	24 October 1980	27 February 1981	126 days	Secretary of State for Press	Adolfo Suárez (1976–1981)	Juan Carlos I (1975–2014)	
	Ignacio Aguirre Borell (1932–2003)	27 February 1981	7 December 1982	1 year, 283 days	Secretary of State for Press	Leopoldo Calvo-Sotelo (1981–1982)	Juan Carlos I (1975–2014)	
	Eduardo Sotillos (born 1940)	7 December 1982	3 July 1985	2 years, 208 days	—	Felipe González (1982–1996)	Juan Carlos I (1975–2014)	
	Javier Solana (born 1942)	4 July 1985	11 July 1988	3 years, 7 days	Minister of Culture	Felipe González (1982–1996)	Juan Carlos I (1975–2014)	
	Rosa Conde (born 1942)	11 July 1988	13 July 1993	5 years, 2 days	Minister Government Spokesperson	Felipe González (1982–1996)	Juan Carlos I (1975–2014)	
	Alfredo Pérez Rubalcaba (1951–2019)	13 July 1993	6 May 1996	2 years, 298 days	Minister of the Presidency	Felipe González (1982–1996)	Juan Carlos I (1975–2014)	
	Miguel Ángel Rodríguez Bajón (born 1964)	6 May 1996	10 July 1998	2 years, 65 days	Secretary of State for Press	José María Aznar (1996–2004)	Juan Carlos I (1975–2014)	
	Josep Piqué (1955–2023)	16 July 1998	27 April 2000	1 year, 286 days	Minister of Industry and Energy	José María Aznar (1996–2004)	Juan Carlos I (1975–2014)	
	Pío Cabanillas Alonso (born 1958)	27 April 2000	9 July 2002	2 years, 73 days	—	José María Aznar (1996–2004)	Juan Carlos I (1975–2014)	
	Mariano Rajoy (born 1955)	9 July 2002	3 September 2003	1 year, 56 days	Deputy PM; Minister of the Presidency	José María Aznar (1996–2004)	Juan Carlos I (1975–2014)	
	Eduardo Zaplana (born 1956)	3 September 2003	17 April 2004	227 days	Minister of Labour and Social Affairs	José María Aznar (1996–2004)	Juan Carlos I (1975–2014)	
	María Teresa Fernández de la Vega (born 1949)	17 April 2004	20 October 2010	6 years, 186 days	Deputy PM; Minister of the Presidency	José Luis Rodríguez Zapatero (2004–2011)	Juan Carlos I (1975–2014)	
	Alfredo Pérez Rubalcaba (1951–2019)	20 October 2010	11 July 2011	264 days	Deputy PM; Minister of the Interior	José Luis Rodríguez Zapatero (2004–2011)	Juan Carlos I (1975–2014)	
	José Blanco López (born 1962)	11 July 2011	22 December 2011	164 days	Minister of Development	José Luis Rodríguez Zapatero (2004–2011)	Juan Carlos I (1975–2014)	
	Soraya Sáenz de Santamaría (born 1971)	22 December 2011	3 November 2016	4 years, 317 days	Deputy PM; Minister of the Presidency	Mariano Rajoy (2011–2018)	Juan Carlos I (1975–2014)	
	Soraya Sáenz de Santamaría (born 1971)	22 December 2011	3 November 2016	4 years, 317 days	Deputy PM; Minister of the Presidency	Mariano Rajoy (2011–2018)	Felipe VI (2014–present)	
	The Baron of Claret (born 1956)	3 November 2016	6 June 2018	1 year, 215 days	Minister of Education, Culture and Sport	Mariano Rajoy (2011–2018)	Felipe VI (2014–present)	
	Isabel Celaá (born 1949)	6 June 2018	12 January 2020	1 year, 220 days	Minister of Education and Vocational Training	Pedro Sánchez (2018–)	Felipe VI (2014–present)	
	María Jesús Montero (born 1966)	12 January 2020	10 July 2021	1 year, 179 days	Minister of Finance	Pedro Sánchez (2018–)	Felipe VI (2014–present)	
	Isabel Rodríguez García (born 1981)	10 July 2021	20 November 2023	2 years, 133 days	Minister for Territorial Policy	Pedro Sánchez (2018–)	Felipe VI (2014–present)	
	Pilar Alegría (born 1977)	20 November 2023	22 December 2025	2 years, 32 days	Minister for Education, Vocational Training and Sports	Pedro Sánchez (2018–)	Felipe VI (2014–present)	
sinmarco	Elma Saiz (born 1975)	22 December 2025	En el cargo	260 days	Minister of Inclusion, Social Security and Migration	Pedro Sánchez (2018–)	Felipe VI (2014–present)	

== See also ==
- Ministry of Information and Tourism

== Bibliography ==
- Campos Zabala, María Victoria (2005). "La administración comunicativa en España: orígenes de la función de portavoz de gobierno" [Communication administration in Spain: origins of the government spokesperson role]. Doxa Comunicación. Revista Interdisciplinar de Estudios de Comunicación y Ciencias Sociales (in Spanish) (3): 87–106. doi:10.31921/doxacom.n3a5. eISSN 2386-3978. hdl:10637/5964. ISSN 1696-019X.
