= Pío Cabanillas Alonso =

Spanish politician (born 1958)

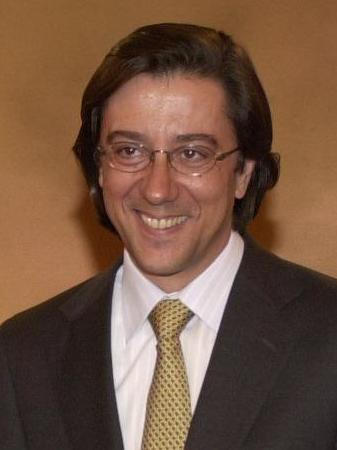

Spokesperson Minister of the Government
- In office 28 April 2000 – 10 July 2002
- Preceded by: Josep Piqué
- Succeeded by: Mariano Rajoy

Personal details
- Born: Pío Cabanillas Alonso; 9 December 1958 (age 67) Madrid, Spain
- Party: Independent
- Education: Complutense University of Madrid

Pío Cabanillas Alonso (born 9 December 1958) is a Spanish politician who served as Spokesperson Minister of the Government from April 2000 to July 2002. He is the son of Pío Cabanillas Gallas.
