= Palace of Villamejor =

- Palacio de Villamejor (Spanish)
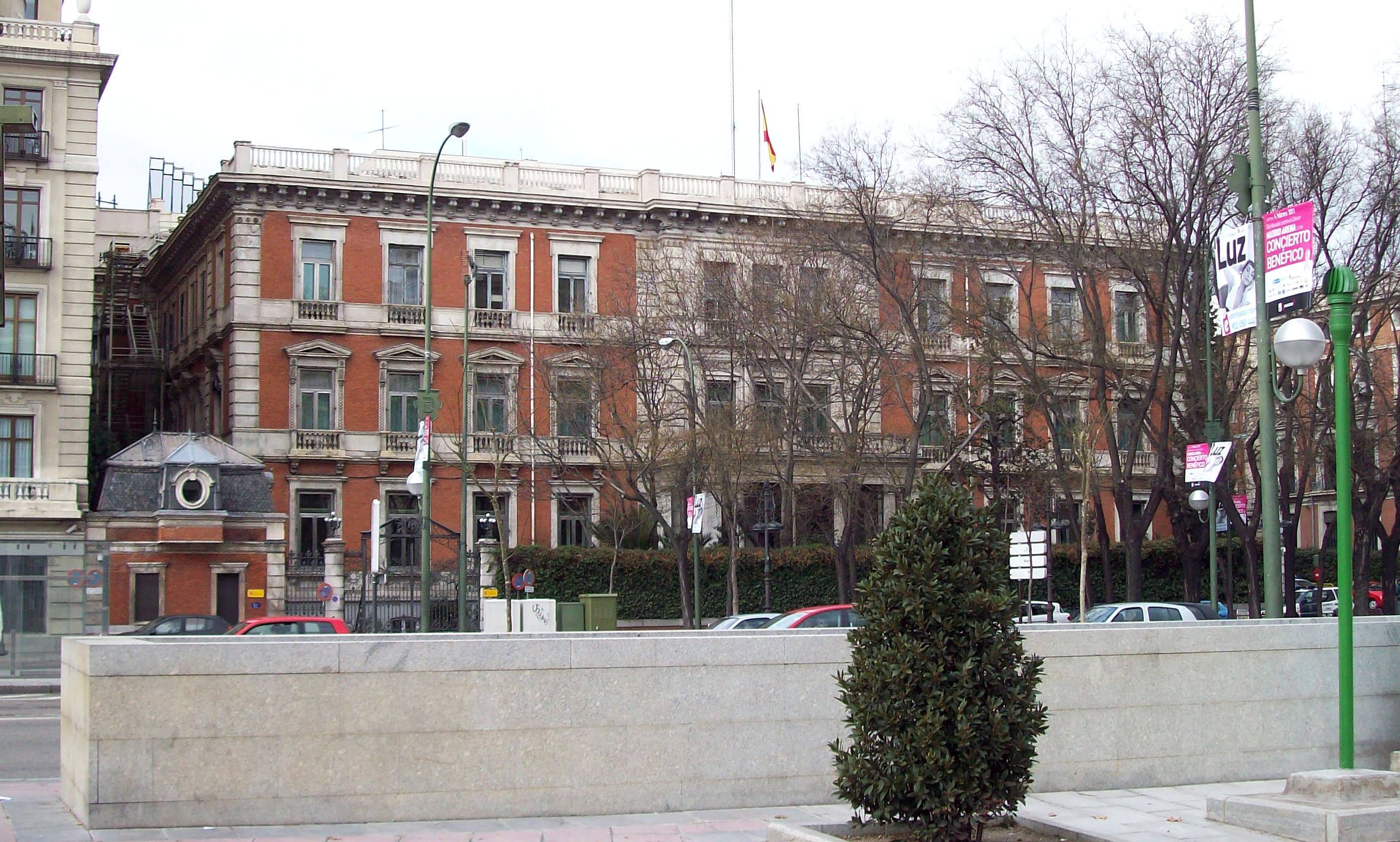

- Location within Madrid Location within Community of Madrid Location within Spain
- 40.426302°N 3.690776°W
- Location: Madrid, Spain

Spanish Cultural Heritage
- Official name: Palacio de Villamejor
- Type: Non-movable
- Criteria: Monument
- Designated: 2003
- Reference no.: RI-51-0010920

The Palace of Villamejor (Spanish: Palacio de Villamejor) is a palace located on the Paseo de la Castellana in Madrid, Spain.

The palace was built for Ignacio Figueroa y Mendieta, marquess consort of Villamejor, between the 1880s and the 1890s. His heirs sold the property to Prince Carlos of Bourbon-Two Sicilies in 1906 and, in 1914, the prince sold it to the Spanish government as residence of the Prime Minister, a role that it maintained until 1976, when Adolfo Suárez moved the official residence over to the Palace of Moncloa. The palace now houses the Ministry for Territorial Policy Democratic Memory.

== Conservation ==
The 19th-century building was declared a Property of Cultural Interest (Spanish: Bien de Interés Cultural) in 2003.
