= Palace of Moncloa =

Residence of the Prime Minister of Spain

- Palacio de la Moncloa

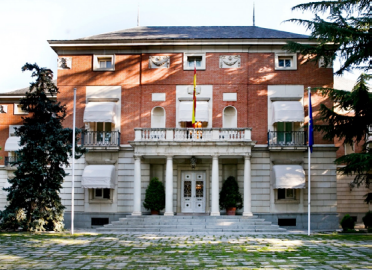
- Main entrance of the building
- Interactive map of the Palace of Moncloa area
- Former names: Palace of the Counts of Moncloa
- Alternative names: La Moncloa

General information
- Location: Avenida Puerta de Hierro, s/n, Madrid, Spain
- Coordinates: 40.4436°N 3.7371°W
- Current tenants: Prime Minister Pedro Sánchez and his family
- Construction started: 1947 (reconstruction of the 17th-century original)
- Completed: 1955
- Renovated: 1977
- Owner: Government of Spain

Design and construction
- Architects: Isidro González Velázquez; Joaquín Ezquerra del Bayo; Diego Méndez; José de Azpiroz y Azpiroz

The Palace of Moncloa (Spanish: Palacio de la Moncloa), also known as Moncloa Palace or La Moncloa, is the official residence and workplace of the prime minister of Spain. It is located on Puerta de Hierro Avenue in the Moncloa-Aravaca district of Madrid. It has been the official residence of the Prime Minister since 1977, when Adolfo Suárez moved the residence from the Palace of Villamejor.

The Palace of Moncloa is part of the Moncloa Complex, which includes 16 buildings, a bunker and a hospital. The Ministry of the Presidency, the Deputy Prime Minister's Office, the Cabinet Office, the Chief of Staff's Office and the Press Office are all located at this complex. The weekly meetings of the Council of Ministers are also held at the complex, in the Council Building.

In Spain, 'Moncloa' is sometimes used as a metonym for the central government, especially when contrasting with the governments of the Autonomous Communities.

== History ==
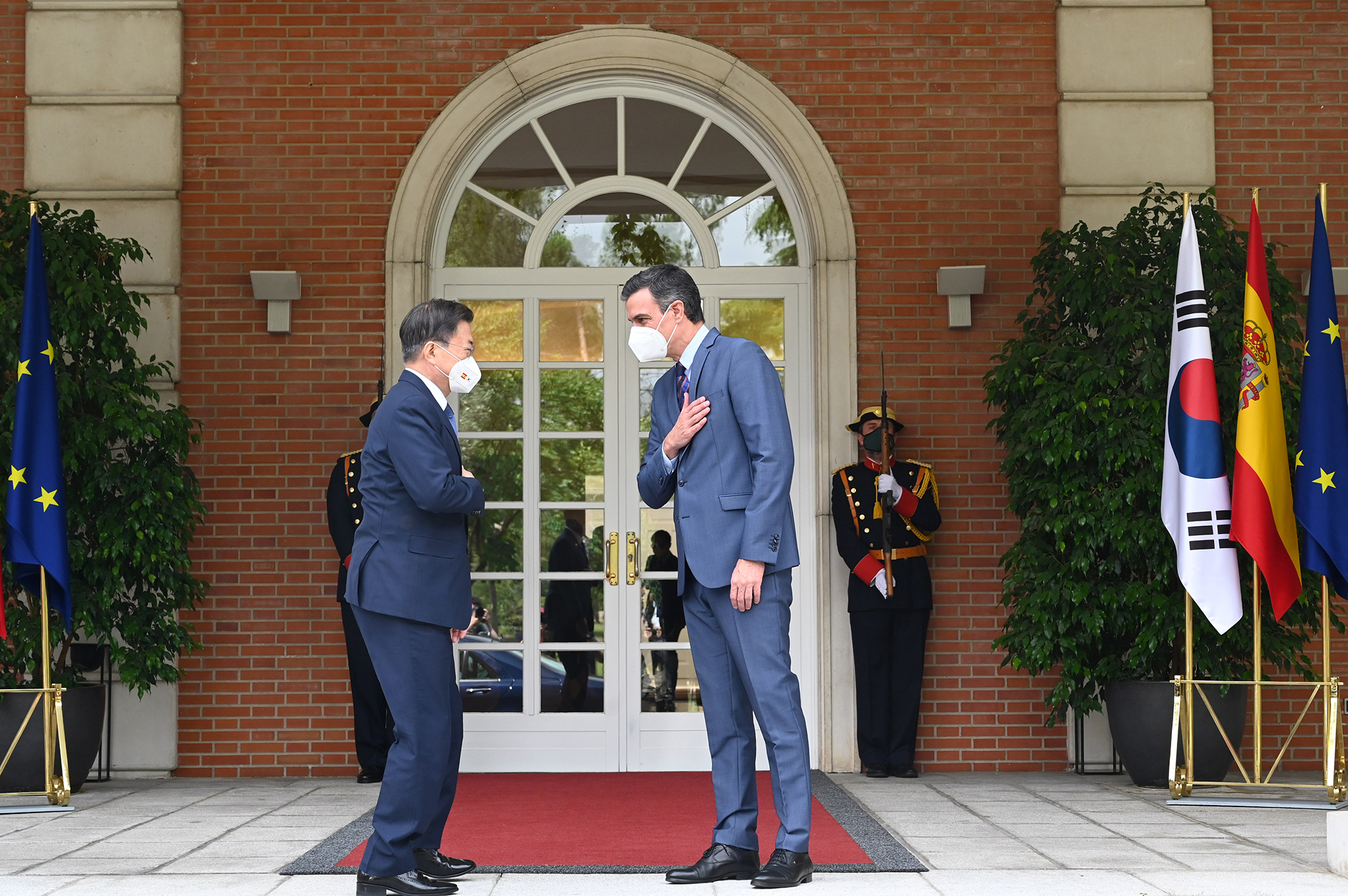
Prime Minister Pedro Sánchez welcoming the President of the Republic of Korea Moon Jae-in at the entrance of Palacio de La Moncloa.

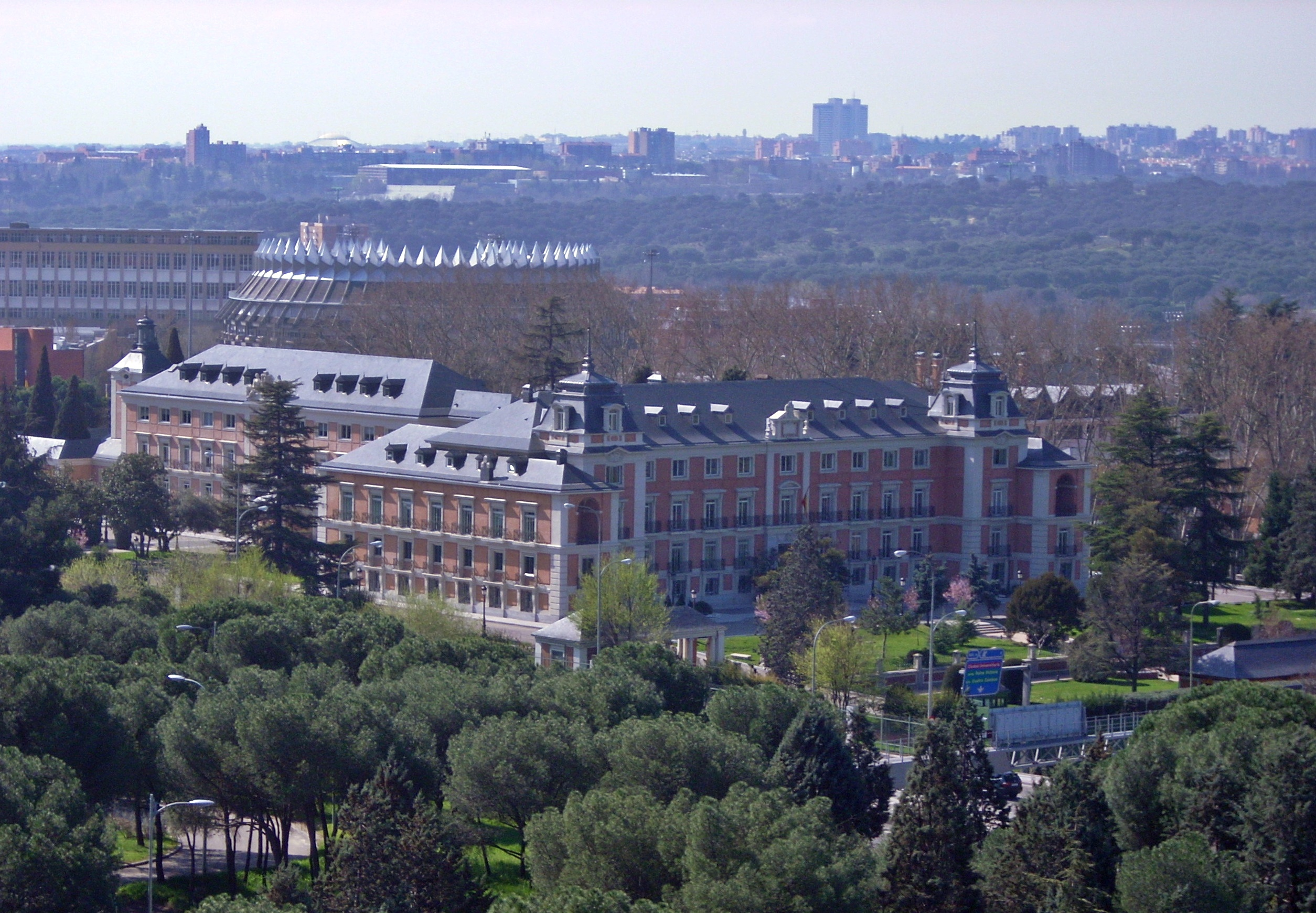
Overview of the Moncloa Complex

The Moncloa Palace was originally a farm for agricultural use, which, due to its good situation, later became a palace-house. In 1660 it was bought by Gaspar de Haro y Guzmán, Marquis of Carpio and Eliche, owner of the neighboring orchard of La Moncloa, a name that came from its former owners, the Counts of Monclova, which later gave rise to Moncloa, as known today.

When the two gardens were joined, Gaspar de Haro had a palace built on the highest part of the land, known first as Eliche's Palace and also as Painted House, in reference to the frescoes that adorned the exterior walls, and later as Palace of La Moncloa.

The Palace passed through different owners until reaching María del Pilar Teresa Cayetana de Silva Álvarez de Toledo, 13th Duchess of Alba de Tormes. After her death without descendants in 1802, King Charles IV acquired the mansion and the orchard and added it to the Royal Site of La Florida, which was then named the Royal Site of La Moncloa. In 1816, King Ferdinand VII ordered the restoration of the palace.

Thirty years later, Queen Isabella II ceded the property of La Moncloa to the State, and it went on to become part of the Ministry of Development. The palace was restored again in 1929, when it was reopened as a museum.

The Palace was destroyed during the Siege of Madrid in the Spanish Civil War.

A decade after its destruction, the architect Diego Méndez built, between 1949 and 1953, the present building following the model of the Casa del Labrador of Aranjuez. Then it was destined to official residence of heads of State in visits to Spain and high personalities.

By a law of July 15, 1954, the Moncloa Palace and its gardens, with an area of 58,293.81 square meters and adjoining the four cardinal points with land of the University City of Madrid, was integrated into the National Heritage. The new design was adapted to the new functions assigned to the palace, which was inaugurated by Francisco Franco in 1953. On June 3, 1954, arrived the palace's first visiting foreign head of state, Rafael Leonidas Trujillo; on November 28, 1976, the last one, Carlos Andrés Pérez.

In 1977, Prime Minister Adolfo Suárez moved the headquarters of the Presidency of the Government, located until then in the central Villamejor Palace, to the far more remote La Moncloa. The change occurred for security reasons, in the face of concern that an attack against the young prime minister, newly appointed by King Juan Carlos I. With the new palace was also established on it the official residence for the Prime Minister and his family.

== Renovations ==
Since 1977, successive prime ministers have consistently ordered renovations and expansions of the complex. Adolfo Suarez ordered the construction of a tennis court and the renovation of the pool. He also ordered the old main courtyard be covered, which would later become the famous Hall of Columns.

During his brief tenure as prime minister in the early 1980s, Leopoldo Calvo-Sotelo installed more bedrooms on the third floor for his eight children as well as a music room. Felipe González arrived in 1982 and cultivated a small orchard of bonsais. González's major contribution, though, was the construction of an underground bunker inspired by his memory of the coup d'état attempt of February 23, 1981. He also built a new building close to the presidential residence to host the Council of Ministers, dedicating the main building to serve more as the private residence of the prime minister.

José María Aznar, Ana Botella, their three sons and two cocker dogs lived at Moncloa between 1996 and 2004. Aznar was responsible for the construction of a game room for his children as well as a paddle tennis court to practice his favorite sport. Sonsoles Espinosa, wife of the Prime Minister José Luis Rodríguez Zapatero, decided to radically renovate the private rooms. She favored a minimalist style, painting the rooms light colors, changing classic furniture for different designs (but retaining certain pieces such as the table of General Narváez, a gift from Juan Carlos I to Adolfo Suárez located in the Prime Minister's Office) and hung pictures of contemporary artists on the walls. Mariano Rajoy and his wife did not make many changes that are known beyond swapping out the vases.

== Public access and security ==
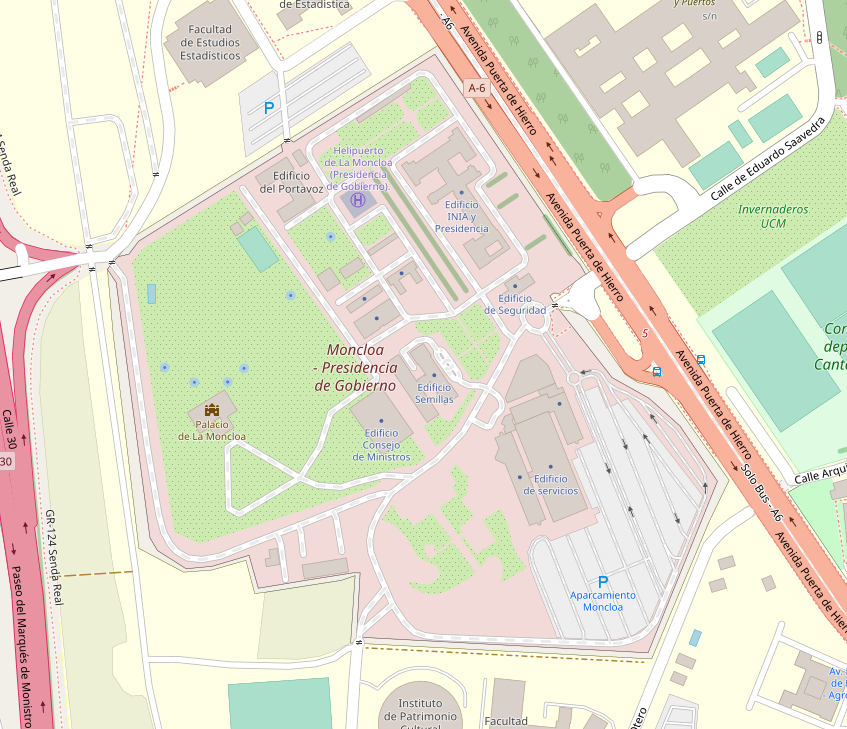
Map of the property

=== Accessibility ===
Before September 19, 2018, entrance to the palace by the public was not allowed. Only accredited personnel like journalists or public servants were allowed to enter, along with universities, high schools and primary schools students. These latter usually make a short tour to know the gardens and the Press Center.

Since September 2018, the new PM (Pedro Sánchez) has allowed the public to visit the complex – not only the Press Room and the Council Room, but also the main buildings of the complex, including the Deputy PM's Office, the Ministry of the Presidency building and the Prime Minister's Chief of Staff's Office.

There is a tradition in summertime by which the prime minister makes a tour through the Palace with the children of the employees of the complex.

The requirements to visit the governmental complex is to be a Spanish citizen or to live in Spain, ask for a date, show the guards your ID, and leave in the entrance all electronic devices.

=== Security ===
The security of the complex is carried out by the Department of Security of the Presidency of the Government, a government body responsible for the protection of the Prime Minister, Deputy Prime Minister, Government's Ministers and former Prime Ministers, along with their families. It also gives protection to the Moncloa Complex and the private and public residences of the members of the Government.

The security agents come from the Civil Guard and the National Police Corps.

== Buildings in the Moncloa Complex ==
=== Council Building ===
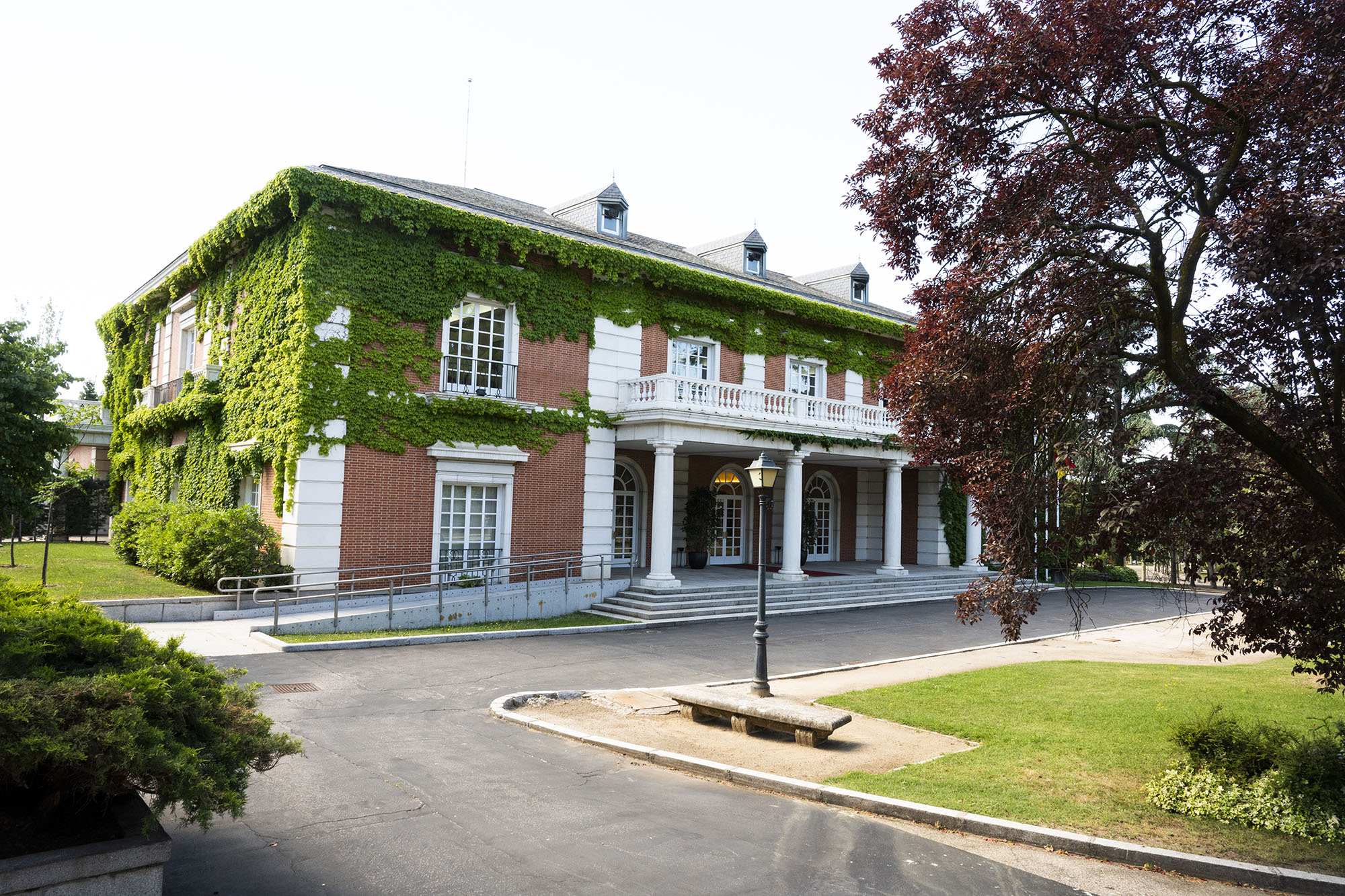
Council Building

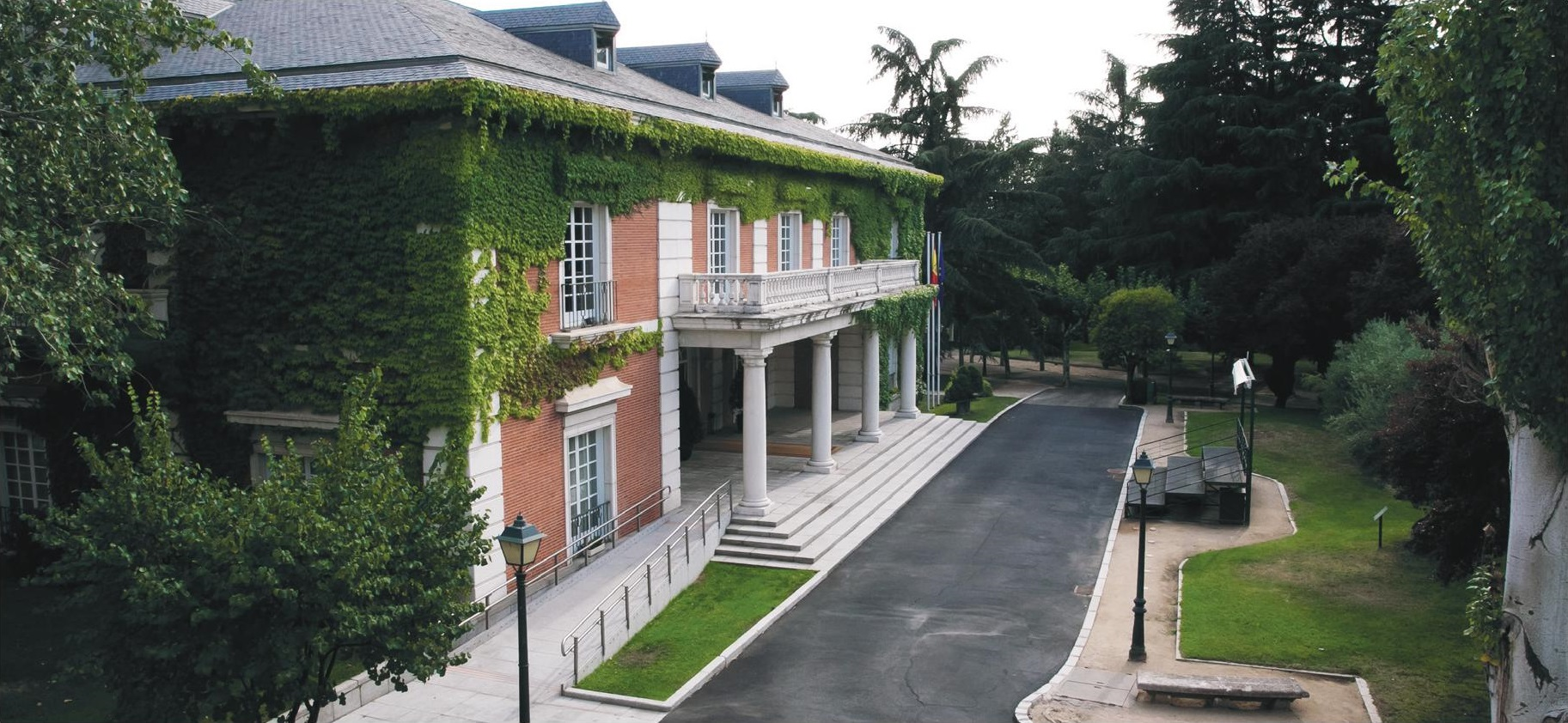
View toward the Council Building

The building was built in 1989 during the premiership of Felipe González in order to differentiate the residential and working areas of the palace.

The Prime Minister's Office maintains an agreement with the Reina Sofía Museum under which the decoration of the building is composed of works of this museum. The artistic collection consists of more than 140 works by authors such as Joan Miró, Eduardo Chillida, Julio González, Pablo Palazuelo or Antoni Tàpies, among others. It also has numerous furniture belonging to the National Heritage.

==== Council Room ====
The main room of the building is the Council Room, where the meetings of the Council of Ministers are held.

==== Tapestry Room ====
The Tapestry Room is one of the biggest rooms in the building. It is used for receptions, official events and, occasionally, for press conferences.

==== Tàpies Room ====
The Tàpies Room is an area where the Prime Minister receives guests.

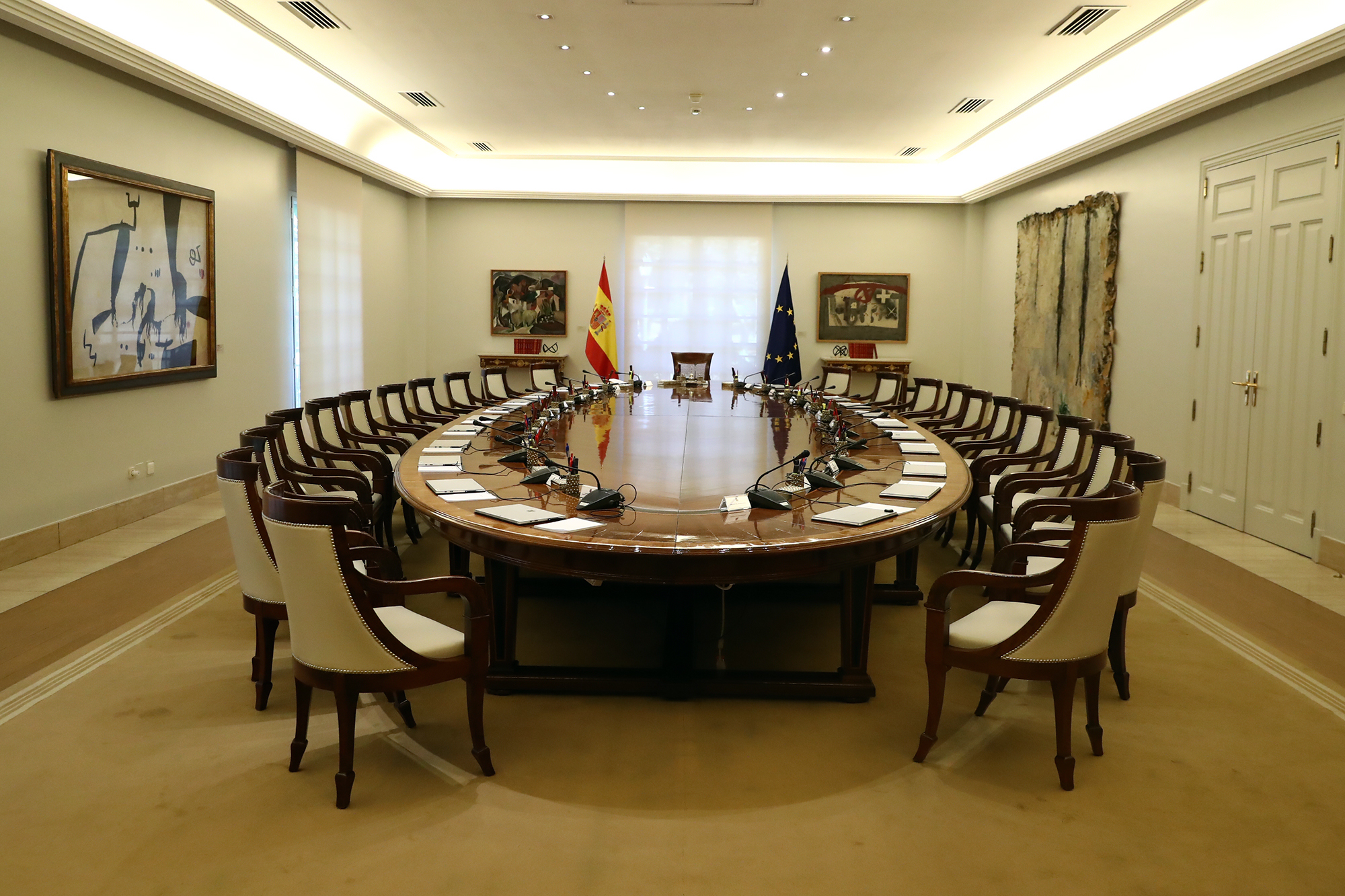
Council Room

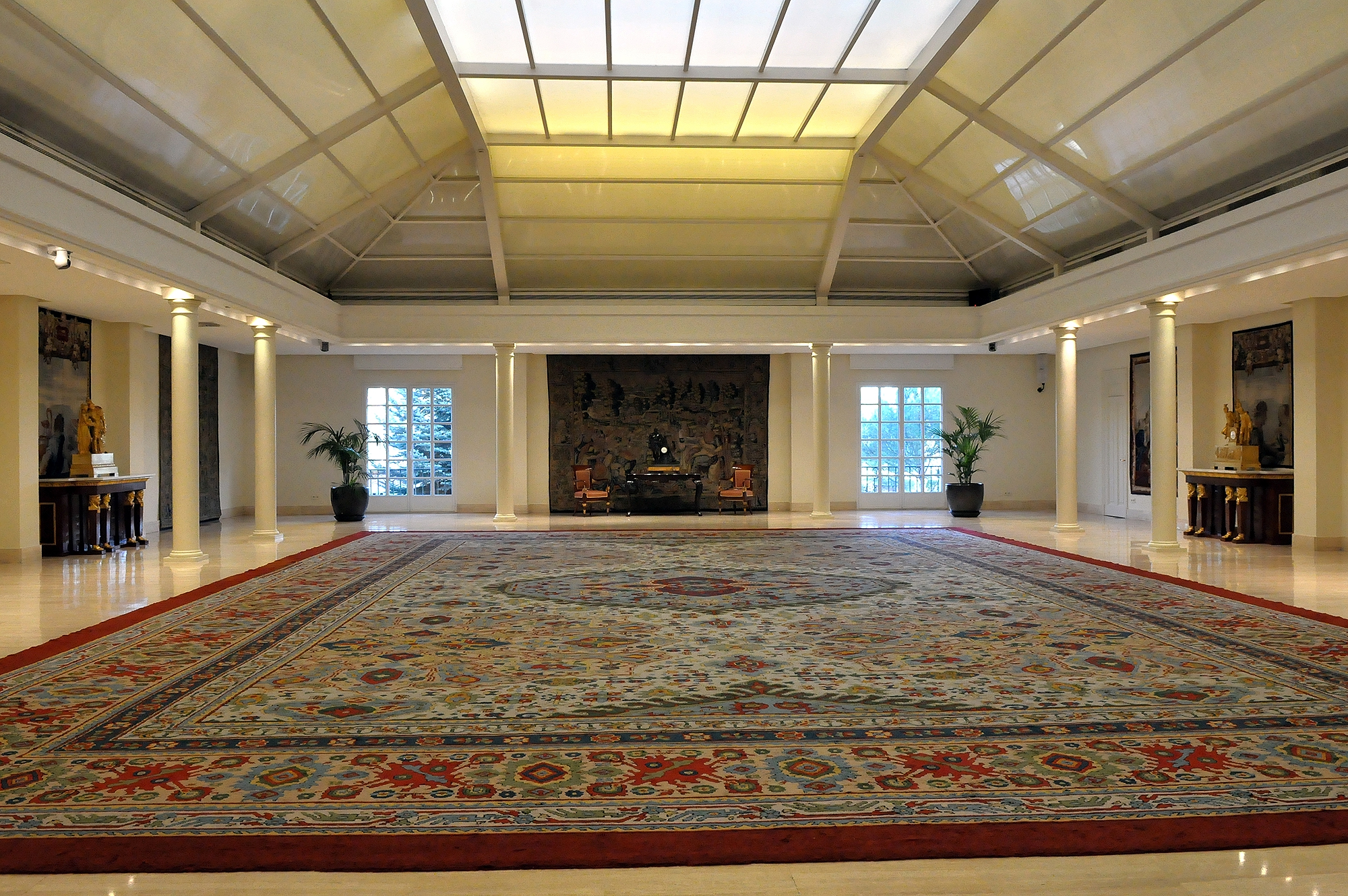
Tapestry Room

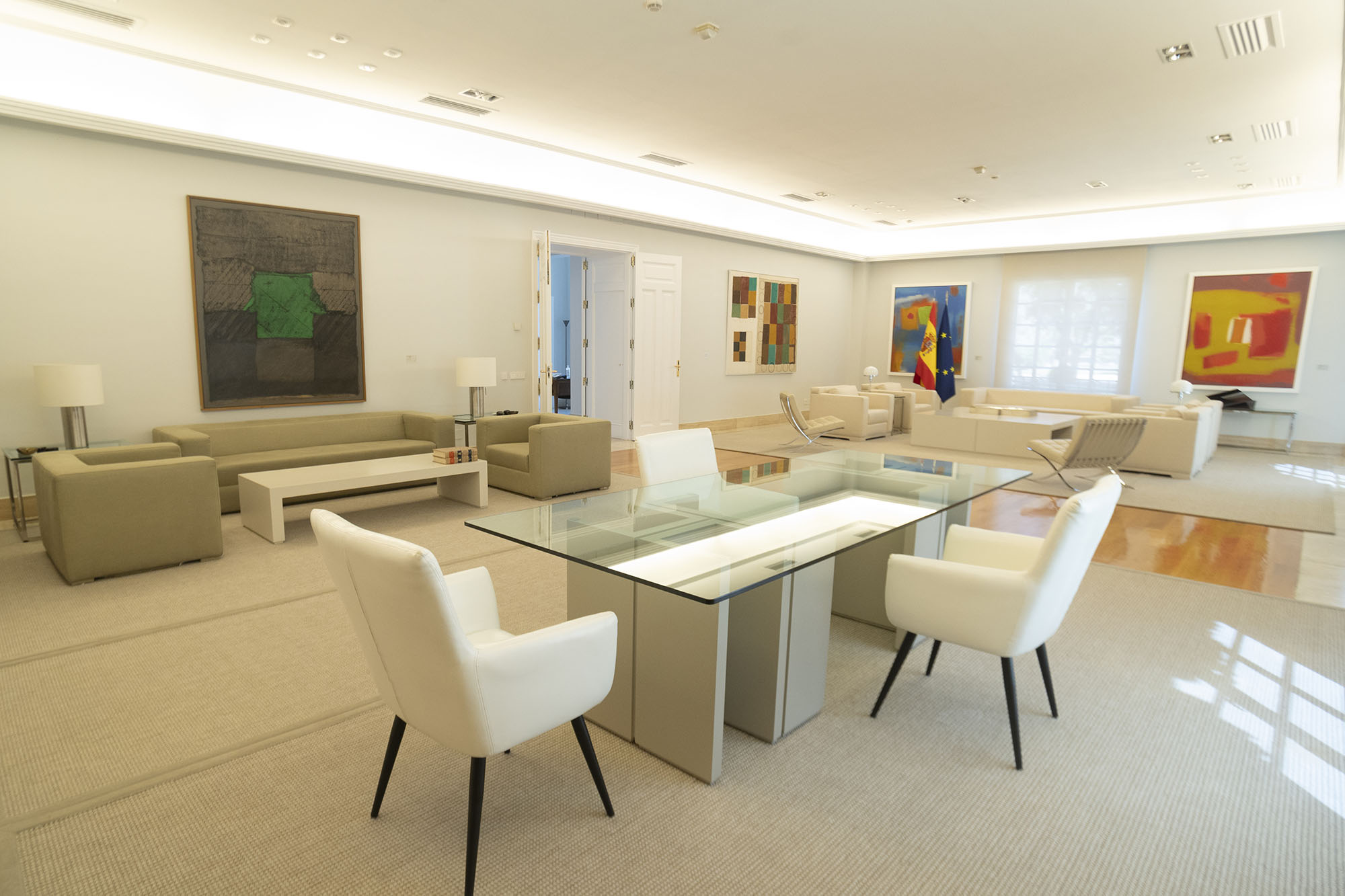
Tàpies Room

=== Vice Presidency Building ===
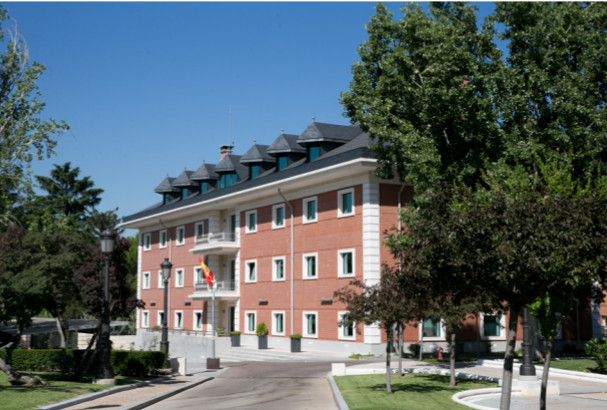
Vice Presidency Building

It is one of the newest buildings of the Complex. It was built in 2006 under the premiership of José Luis Rodriguez Zapatero. This building currently houses the Deputy Prime Minister's Office.

=== Seeds Building ===
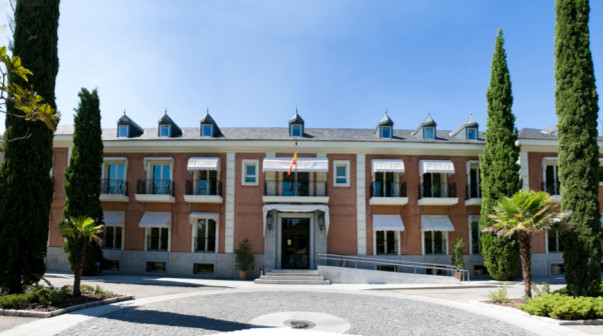
Seeds Building

The Seeds Building was built in 1950 as part of the Ministry of Agriculture. Its name is because it was the place where the seeds were once stored.

It currently hosts the personal Cabinet of the Office of the Prime Minister. On the first floor is the office of the Chief of Staff, an office that was used in the 1980s by Alfonso Guerra, and before by Joaquín Garrigues Walker with prime minister Adolfo Suárez.

=== INIA Building ===
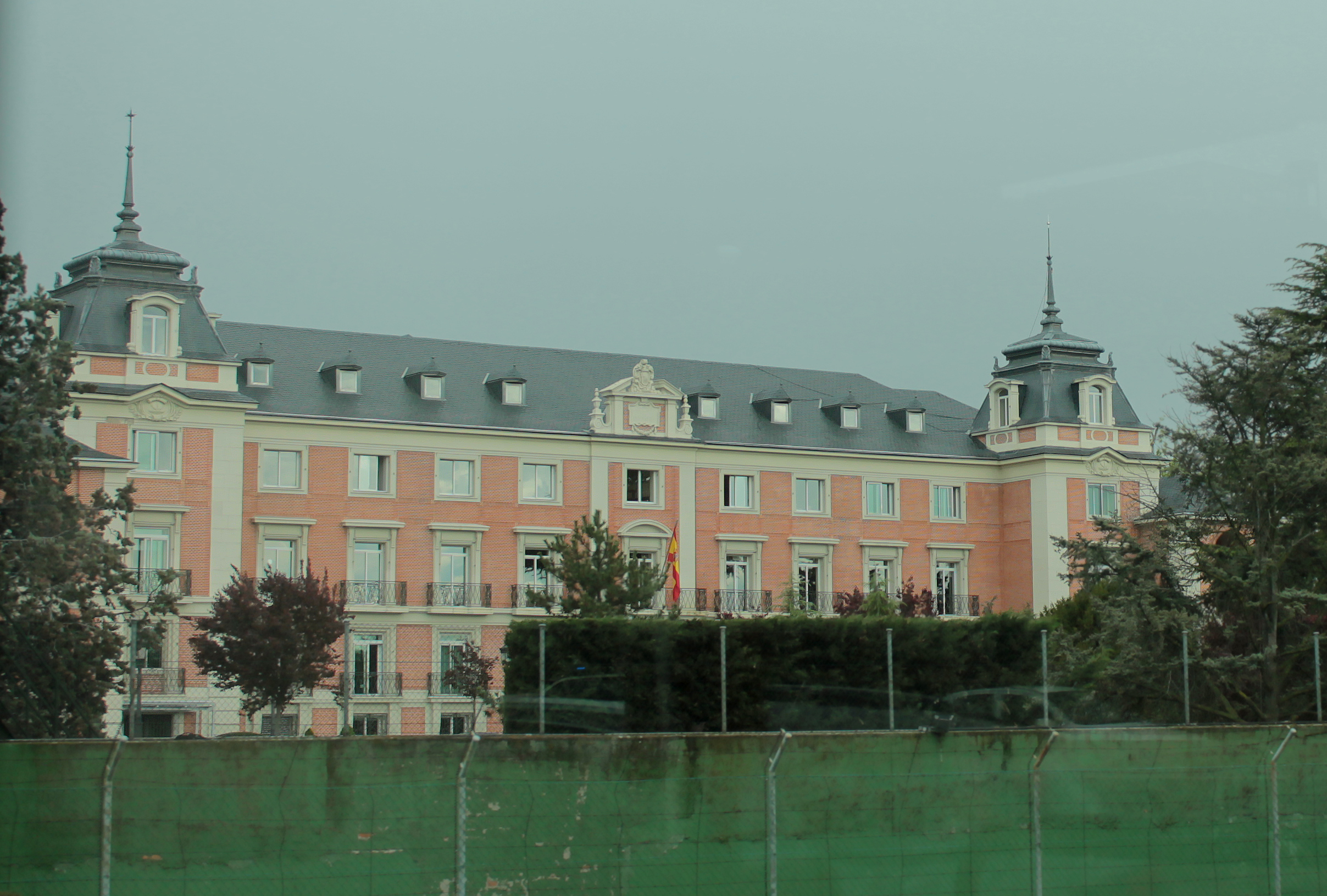
INIA Building

The INIA building was built in 1953 by the architect José Azpiroz. It receives this name for having housed the National Institute of Agrarian Research (INIA). It is also known as the Monastery of the Presidency because for its resemblance to a monastery.

It is currently the headquarters of the Ministry of the Presidency.

==== General Commission Room ====
Inside of the INIA building takes place the meetings of the General Commission of Secretaries of State and Undersecretaries, the body responsible for preparing the matters to be discussed in the Council of Ministers.

=== Press Building ===
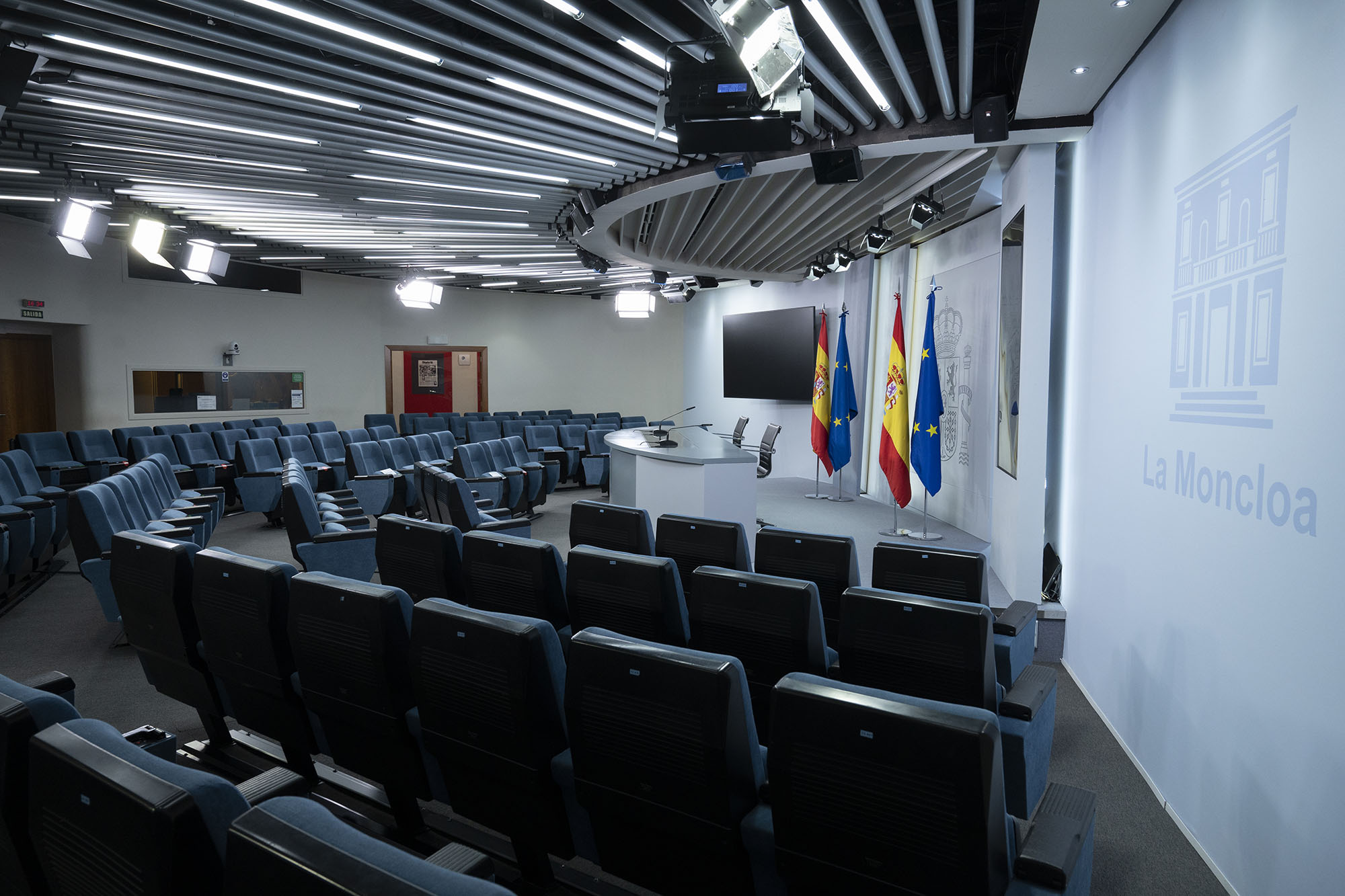
Press Centre

It was built in 1950 as another branch of the Ministry of Agriculture, formerly the laboratory where seeds were analyzed. When the government's headquarters were moved to Moncloa, it housed the Information Office. Between 1988 and 1993, and between 2000 and 2002, the building was the headquarters of a ministerial department when the Information Office was elevated to the rank of a Ministry.

Currently, the building houses the Secretariat of State for Press. Among its rooms are the Press Room, where journalists have their own place to work, and the Press Centre, where the Spokesperson and other ministers hold the press briefing after meetings of the Council of Ministers.

=== Other buildings ===
The whole complex is composed of 16 buildings where the different services of the Prime Minister's Office are distributed, such as security, protocol, health service, etc.

== Prime Minister's Office ==
The Prime Minister's Office lies within the Moncloa Palace. It is staffed by a mix of career Civil Servants and Advisers. The highest ranking of the Office is the Chief of Staff, which is a political appointment on which the rest of the Office officials depend.
