= Miguel Ángel Ballesteros =

Spanish Army officer

The Most Excellent Miguel Ángel Ballesteros
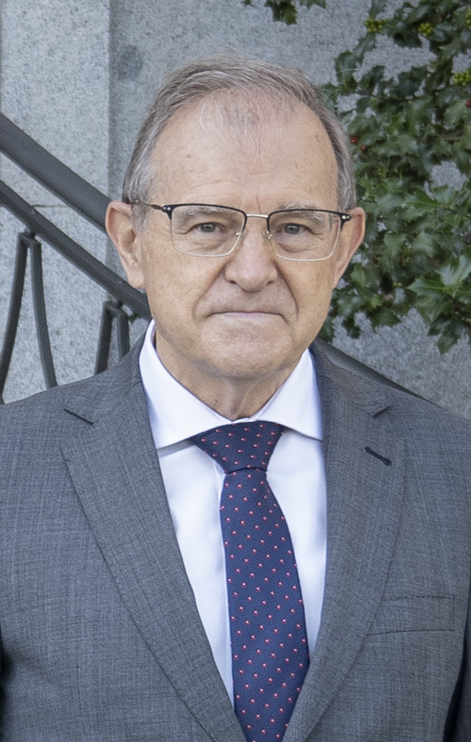

Director of the Homeland Security Department
- In office 19 June 2018 – 29 November 2023
- Monarch: Felipe VI
- Prime Minister: Pedro Sánchez
- Preceded by: Cristina Ysasi-Ysasmendi Pemán
- Succeeded by: Loreto Gutiérrez Hurtado

Personal details
- Born: Miguel Ángel Ballesteros Martín; 1953 (age 72–73) Segovia, Spain
- Education: General Military Academy; University of Valencia; Pontifical University of Salamanca

Military service
- Allegiance: Spain
- Branch/service: Spanish Army
- Years of service: 1972–2023
- Rank: Brigadier general

Miguel Ángel Ballesteros Martín (born 1953) is a retired Spanish Army artillery officer. Ballesteros is an expert in geopolitics, security strategies and prevention of terrorism. From June 2018 to November 2023, he served as the 3rd director of the National Security Department of the Prime Minister's Office.

== Biography ==
Ballesteros was born in Segovia, in 1953. Ballesteros joined the General Military Academy in 1972, choosing the Artillery Weapon branch whose academy is in his native Segovia. After passing the studies, he was promoted to Lieutenant of Artillery in 1976. He was assigned to different positions in the Artillery Weapon branch and in the General Staff, highlighting his destiny to the Operational Military Research Center of the Ministry of Defence.

He has a degree in Operational Research from the University of Valencia (1979), a diploma in the General Staff (1991), he conducted courses on Strategy and the USSR in World Policy at the National University of Distance Education (1991-1992) and a PhD from the Pontifical University of Salamanca with a thesis entitled "Methodology to develop a national security strategy". Due to this thesis he was granted with the 2015 Extraordinary Award by the Faculty of Political Science of Madrid.

A specialist in geopolitics and in terrorism and jihadism prevention, from 1995 to September 2012 he has been an associate professor at the Pontifical University of Salamanca and since October 2015 at the Faculty of Political and Social Sciences of the Complutense University of Madrid. He has also directed several summer courses at the Complutense University of Madrid at the Escorial, at the Menéndez Pelayo International University and at the International University of Andalusia in Seville. He is also a collaborating professor in the master of terrorism prevention at the Rey Juan Carlos University.

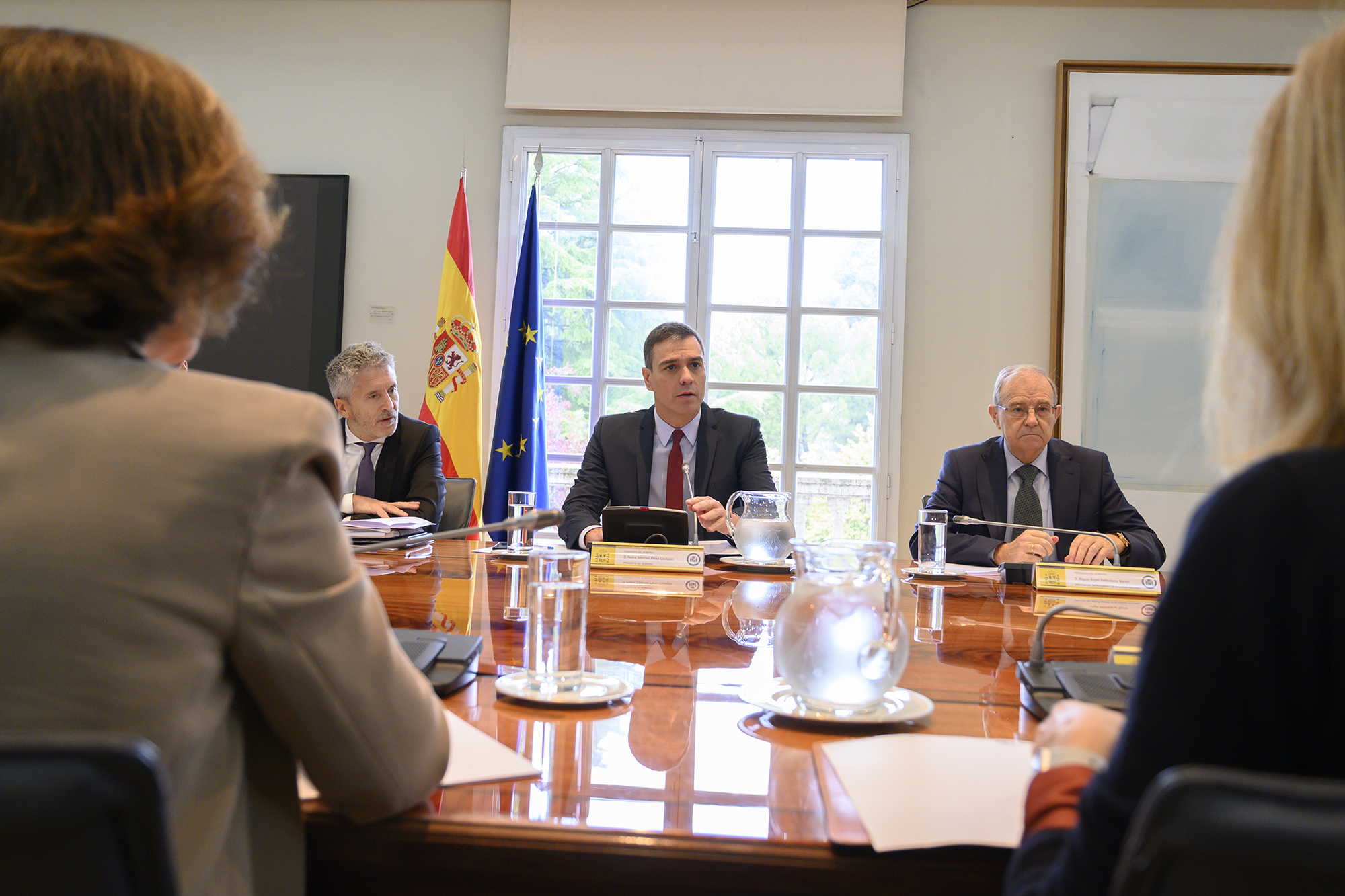
The Director of the Homeland Security Department, Miguel Ángel Ballesteros, in a meeting of the Coordination Committee on the situation in Catalonia in October 2019.

He was the first head of the satellite center "Spanish Helios Main Center" and head of the 'Brand Team' for the development of the HELIOS multinational satellite program (French, Italian and Spanish reconnaissance satellites). Between 2002 and 2008, he was the Head of the Department of Strategy and International Relations of the College of the Armed Forces (ESFAS) of the Higher Center for Defense Studies (CESEDEN).

In 2009 he was appointed General Director of the Spanish Institute for Strategic Studies (IEEE) and as a specialist in security and jihadism has published numerous articles in specialized publications, in addition to being a regular contributor to various media.

On 19 June 2018, Ballesteros was appointed as the 3rd Director of the National Security Department, an advisory body of the Cabinet Office. He was also the first director that is not at the same time Moncloa Deputy Chief of Staff.

He retired in late 2023.
