= Government Delegated Committees =

The Government Delegated Committees, in Spain, are a collective decision-making-body of the Spanish government consisting on Cabinet ministers and non-Cabinet ministers. This Committees are secondary work bodies of the Council of Ministers responsible for the discussion or resolution the topics that do not require to be discussed in the Cabinet itself.

The committees are created, modified or suppressed by the Prime Minister with the approval of the Council of Ministers. The members of the committees may be cabinet ministers or junior ministers such as secretaries of State, although the committee itself can invite to its meetings other senior officials of the administration.

== History ==
The first delegated committee was created in 1939. It was the National Defence Board (predecessor of the National Security Council) chaired by the Prime Minister. A few years later, in 1953, a second committee was created to deal with the agreements with the United States. It was suppressed in 1961. In 1957, the committees were increased to six, creating the delegated committees for Economic Affairs (which has existed since then, becoming de facto a standing committee), for Transport and Communications, for Cultural Action, and for Health and Social Affairs.

A new committee was created in 1963 to consider matters relating to scientific policy. In 1972, the committee for Environment was created and in 1979 the Delegated Committee for Foreign Policy. The need to coordinate the devolution of powers to the regions was the main reason for the creation of the Government Delegated Committee for Regional Policy in 1980.

The committees reshuffle of 1981 established five delegated committees: for Foreign Policy; for the State Security; for Economic Affairs; for Regional Policy; and for Educational, Cultural and Scientific Policy. In 1986, it was created the Government Delegated Committee for Crisis Situations to deal with national and international crisis affecting national security. In 1997, it was created the Government Delegated Committee for Cultural Affairs.

Another important reshuffle was carried out in 2004, reducing the number of committees to four: for Crisis Situations; for Economic Affairs; for Scientific Research and Development and Technological Innovation; and for Regional Policy. In 2008, the number of committees doubled, creating four new committees: for Immigration; for Climate Change; for Equality Policy; and for Cooperation for Development. Further, the Government Delegated Committee for Scientific Research and Development and Technological Innovation was renamed "for Scientific and Technological Policy". A ninth committee was created in July 2011, executing the provision of the 2002 National Intelligence Centre Act, to consider matters regarding the intelligence policy of the CNI, the police intelligence services and the military intelligence agencies. In December 2011, the committees for immigration, for climate change and for cooperation for development were suppressed.

With the creation of the National Security Council in 2013, the Council assumed the functions of the committee for crisis situations and has the consideration of Government Delegated Committee for National Security. In the July 2018 reshuffle, the government created a committee for migration affairs. In the last reshuffle, in February 2020, the prime minister abolished three delegated committees: scientific affairs, equality policies and migration affairs and created two: demographic challenge and 2030 agenda.

Sometimes the government creates special committees for a concrete and temporary purpose such as the Government Delegated Committee for the Barcelona Olympic Games of 1992 or the Government Delegated Committee for the Spanish Presidency of the European Union.

== Common responsibilities ==
The specific responsibilities of each committee are regulated in the Royal Decree that creates them, however, Section 6 of the Government Act of 1997 establishes common functions on the issues that can be addressed in this committees:

- To discuss general issues that are related to several of the ministerial departments that make up the committee.
- To study those matters that, affecting several Ministries, require the preparation of a joint proposal prior to its resolution by the Council of Ministers.
- To resolve the matters that, affecting more than one Ministry, do not require to be discussed in the Council of Ministers.

== Current committees ==
As set in the Royal Decree of Government Delegated Committees of 2024, it currently exists six delegated committees:

Name	Chair	Deputy Chair	Established	Scope
Economic Affairs	Carlos Cuerpo	Arcadi España	1957	To consider issues relating to the Spanish economy, budgetary affairs, government expenditure, etc.
National Security Council	Felipe VI/Pedro Sánchez	Félix Bolaños	2013	To consider matters relating to national security. In case of national crisis, this committee is responsible for coordination the government action.
Intelligence Affairs	Carlos Cuerpo	Margarita Robles	2011	To consider matter relating to the intelligence services and their coordination.
Demographic Challenge	Sara Aagesen	Luis Planas	2020	To consider issues relating depopulation and other demographic challenges.
2030 Agenda	Yolanda Díaz	José Manuel Albares	2020	To consider matters relating the accomplishment of the United Nations Sustainable Development Goals by the Spanish administrations.
