= Department of National Security (Spain) =

- Departamento de Seguridad Nacional
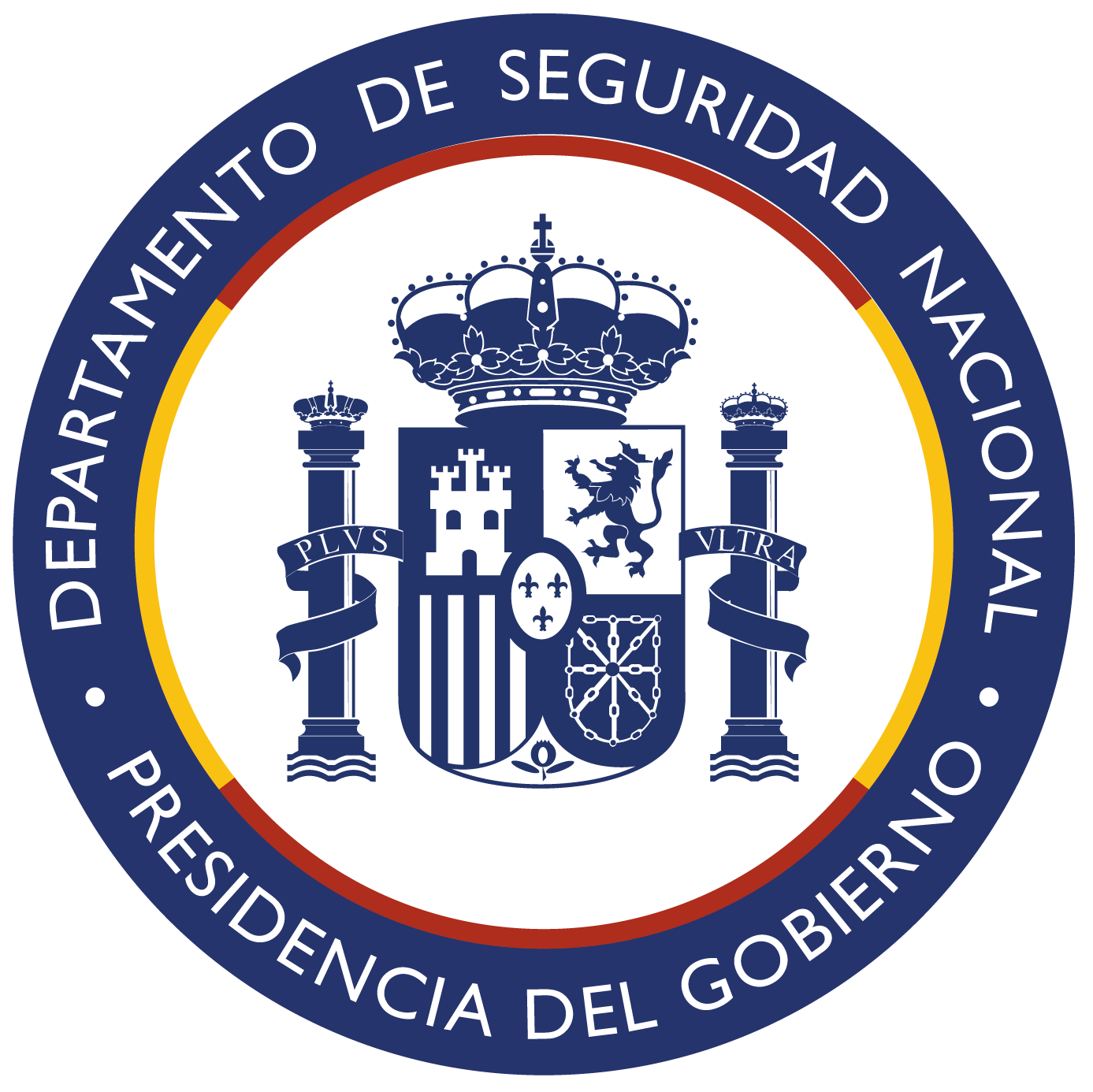
- Emblem of the National Security Department

Agency overview
- Formed: July 23, 2012; 14 years ago
- Jurisdiction: Spain
- Headquarters: Moncloa Palace, Madrid, Spain; 40°26′49.53″N 3°44′6.66″W
- Employees: Classified
- Annual budget: Classified
- Agency executive: Brigadier General Loreto Gutiérrez Hurtado, Director
- Parent department: Cabinet Office
- Website: www.dsn.gob.es

The Department of National Security (DSN) is an advisory staff department of the Spanish Prime Minister's Office on matters of national security and it is a permanent member of the National Security Council. The body was created to assist the Prime Minister in his responsibility leading the national security policy of Spain. It was created on 2012 by the Royal Decree 1119/2012, of July 20, by which the structure of the President of the Government's office is modified.

== Functions ==
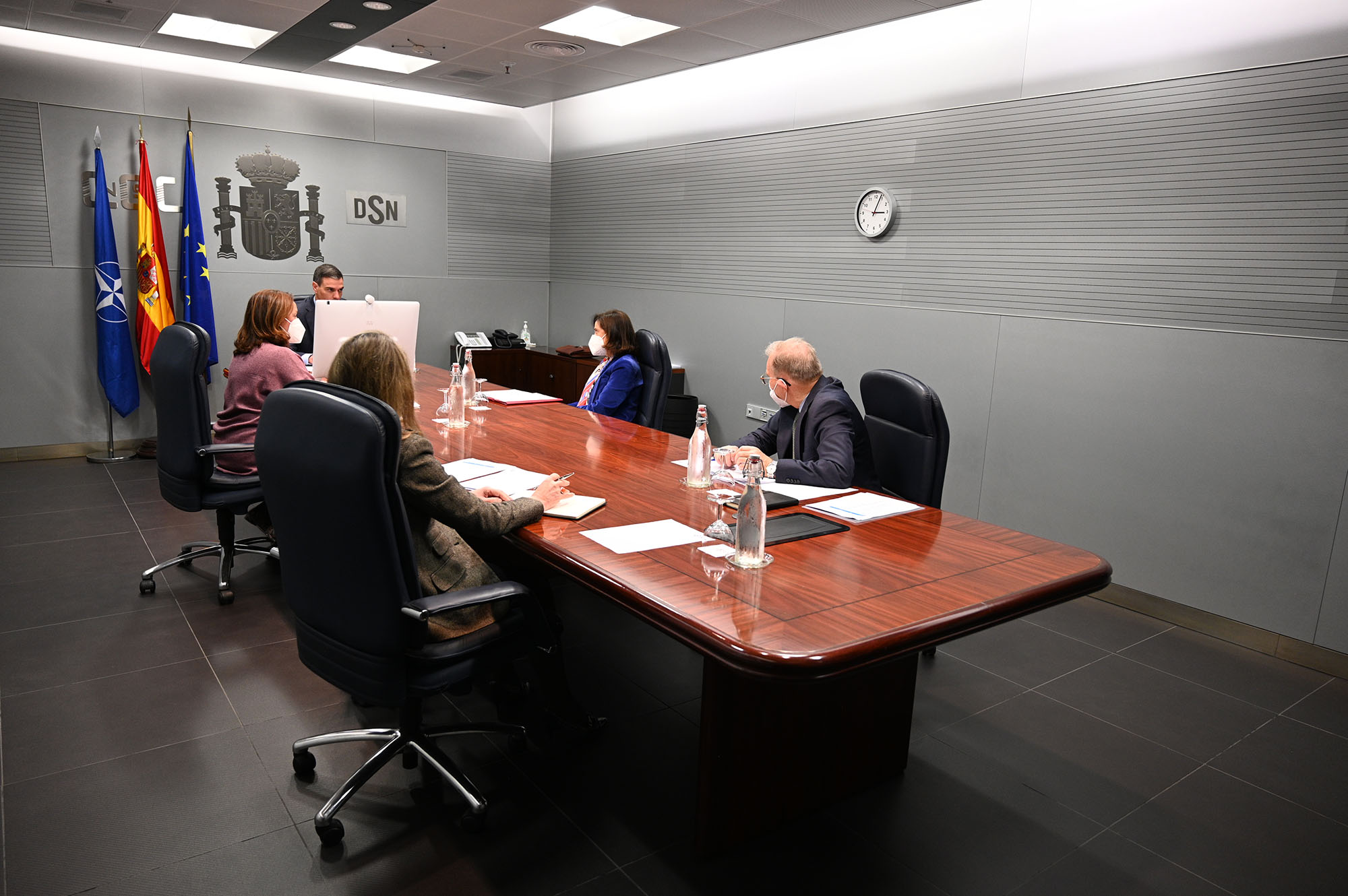
The prime minister, along with other authorities, at the safe facilities of the DSN.

As an advisory body to the Prime Minister, it is his responsibility to provide immediate, optimal and integral support in matters of national security for proper decision-making, as well as, among other functions:

- Prepare studies and reports on national security.
- Carry out early warning and monitoring of risks, threats and crisis situations in coordination with competent bodies and authorities.
- Assist the Chief of Staff of the Prime Minister in his capacity as secretary of the National Security Council as well as represent the Office of the President in the field of National Security.
- Analyze the evolution of risks and threats and their enhancers.
- Contribute to the elaboration of normative proposals on National Security.
- Collaborate in the elaboration of the Annual Reports of National Security.

In the area of crisis management, it supports the activity carried out by the Specialized Committee in this area, and also includes, among other functions:

- Provide adequate support and coordination in the management of crisis situations.
- To maintain and ensure the proper functioning of the National Center for the Conduct of Crisis Situations and the special communications of the Presidency of the Government, as well as to protect its documentation.
- Direct and coordinate the execution of crisis management exercises planned by the Department, as well as those whose direction is required.
- Contribute to the preparation, maintenance and updating of the contingency plans and analyze the crisis scenarios in coordination with the competent bodies.

In the scope of the development of the strategic framework of National Security, it has coordinated the work for the elaboration of the National Security Strategy as well as the second level Strategies, specifically the National Maritime Safety Strategies, National Cybersecurity Strategies and National Energy Security.

== Structure ==
- Prime Minister
  - Moncloa Deputy Chieff of Staff.
    - Director of the Department.
      - Deputy Director for Communications and Infrastructure of the National Security System.
      - Deputy Director for Crisis Planning and Management
      - Deputy Director for Analysis of Risks Associated with the Digital Space

== Directors ==
1. Alfonso de Senillosa (23 July 2012 – 27 January 2018). Civilian.
2. Cristina Ysasi-Ysasmendi (27 January 2018 – 9 June 2018). Civil servant.
3. Miguel Ángel Ballesteros (19 June 2018 – 29 November 2023). Military.
4. Loreto Gutiérrez Hurtado (29 November 2023 – present). Military.

== See also ==
- Presidency of the Government
- National Intelligence Center
- CITCO
