= Alfonso de Senillosa =

Spanish politician (born 1968)

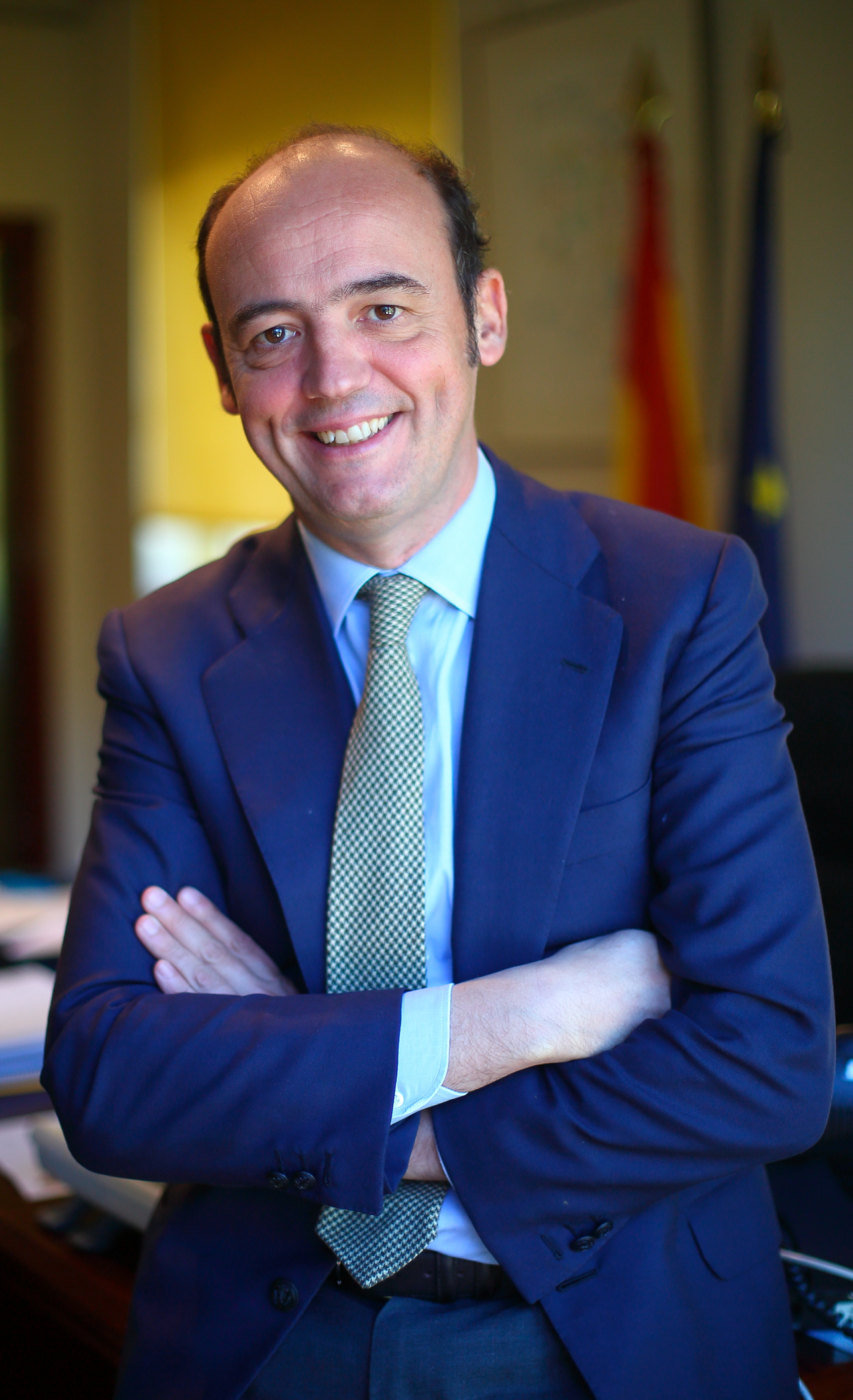

1st Director of the Department of Homeland Security
- In office 23 July 2012 – 26 January 2018
- Preceded by: Position established
- Succeeded by: Cristina Ysasi-Ysasmendi

Moncloa Deputy Chieff of Staff
- In office 30 December 2011 – 26 January 2018
- Preceded by: José Miguel Vidal Zapatero
- Succeeded by: Cristina Ysasi-Ysasmendi Pemán

Member of the Congress of Deputies
- In office 1 December 2011 – 3 January 2012

Personal details
- Born: 20 January 1968 (age 58) Barcelona, Spain
- Party: People's Party
- Spouse: Teresa Abaitua
- Education: IESE Business School
- Profession: Businessman and politician

Alfonso de Senillosa Ramoneda (born 20 January 1968) is a Spanish politician and businessman. He served as Moncloa Deputy Chieff of Staff in the Spanish Prime Minister's Office and Director of the National Security Department between 2011 and 2018.

== Early life and career ==
With an Undergraduate Degree in Marketing by ESEM and in General Management by IESE, in 1998 he founded the technological and reprographics services company, Workcenter, which 10 years later became the biggest in Europe in its field. In 2008, Alfonso de Senillosa and his main partners –Banco Santander and the IBV Corporation (BBVA-Iberdrola)- sold the company to an investors holding led by the N+1 bank.

== Political career ==
In late 2008 he started collaborating with the People's Party as a technological and communication advisor. In June 2009, he was appointed personal advisor on technology to the party's president. One year later, in May 2010, he was promoted to Director of the Executive Cabinet of the party's presidency and, in June 2011, to Director of the Cabinet of the Presidency. Later that year, in November 2011, he was elected Member of the Parliament for Madrid to the Spanish Congress of Deputies.

In December 2011, he became deputy chieff of staff of the Spanish Prime Minister's Cabinet. A few months later, on July the 23rd, 2012, he was also will be appointed Director of the Homeland Security Bureau, a bureau created on that day and which is a permanent agency to advise and give technical support on National Security to the Prime Minister.

Furthermore, he drives the National Security Strategy, the creation of the National Security Council –chaired by the Prime Minister-, and the legislative development of the National Security Law 36/2015.

Likewise, he is in charge of drafting the Security sectorial strategies and is vice-president of the Cybersecurity National Council, the Maritime Security National Council, the Energy Security National Council and the Immigration National Council. He is also vice-president of the Protection of Critical Infrastructure Committee and responsible for the Situation Committee, the main body on crisis management.

At the same time, he is also Counselor at Paradores – a public owned hotel chain- and Member of the Board of the International and Ibero-American Foundation for Administration and Public Policies (FIIAPP). He also participated in the Public Administrations Reform Committee (CORA).

As Deputy Chief of Staff, Alfonso de Senillosa was responsible for the coordination of the National Affairs Department, the International Affairs Department and the EU and G20 Department of the Prime Minister's Office as is stablished by Royal Decree 571/2013.

== Honors and recognition ==
During his business career he has been awarded with the Madrid Young Entrepreneur Award, the Business Risk National Award (2007), and the European Award for Quality and Employment Promotion. Alike, the study case “Workcenter”, realized by Instituto de Empresa (IE) in 2006, obtained the best study case award in Europe from the European Foundation for Management Development and it still is taught in several business schools in Europe and America.

On the other hand, he has been awarded Knight of Honor of the Legion by the Republic of France, with the Great Cross of the National Order of Merit by the Republic of Colombia, with the Great Cross of Merit for Distinguished Services by the Republic of Peru and Honorary Commissioner of the Spanish National Police.
