= National Security Council (Spain) =

Security organization of spain

- Consejo de Seguridad Nacional
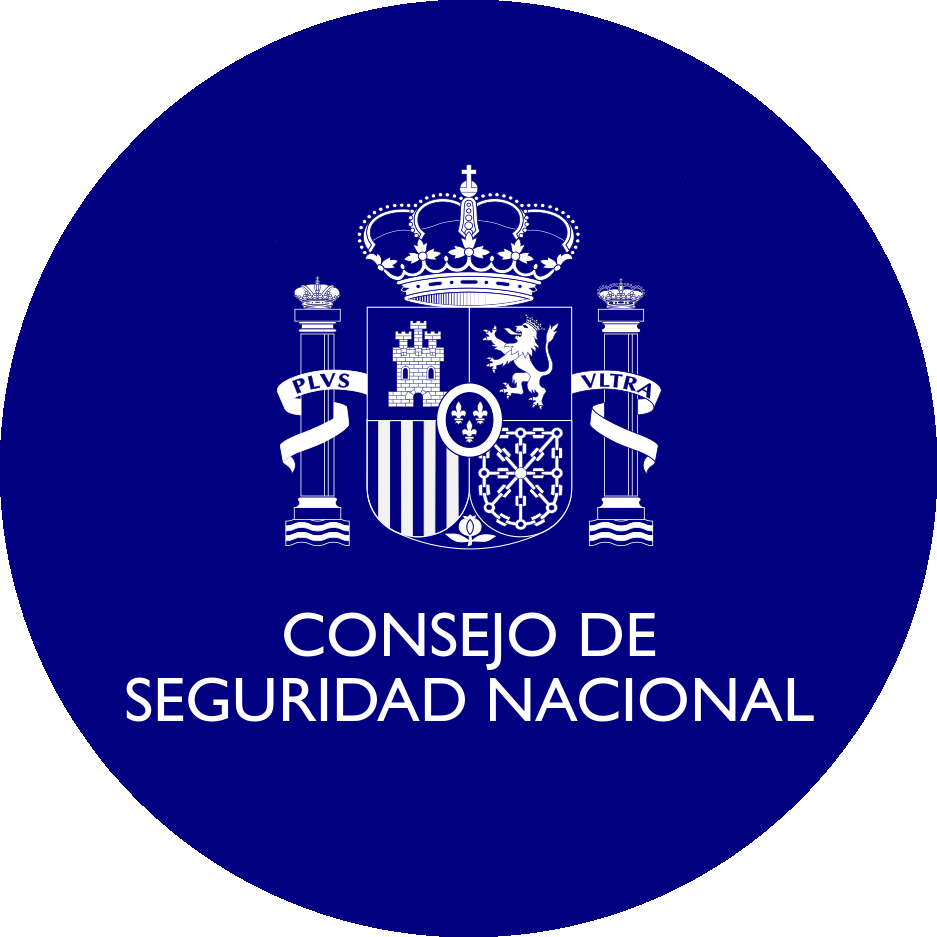

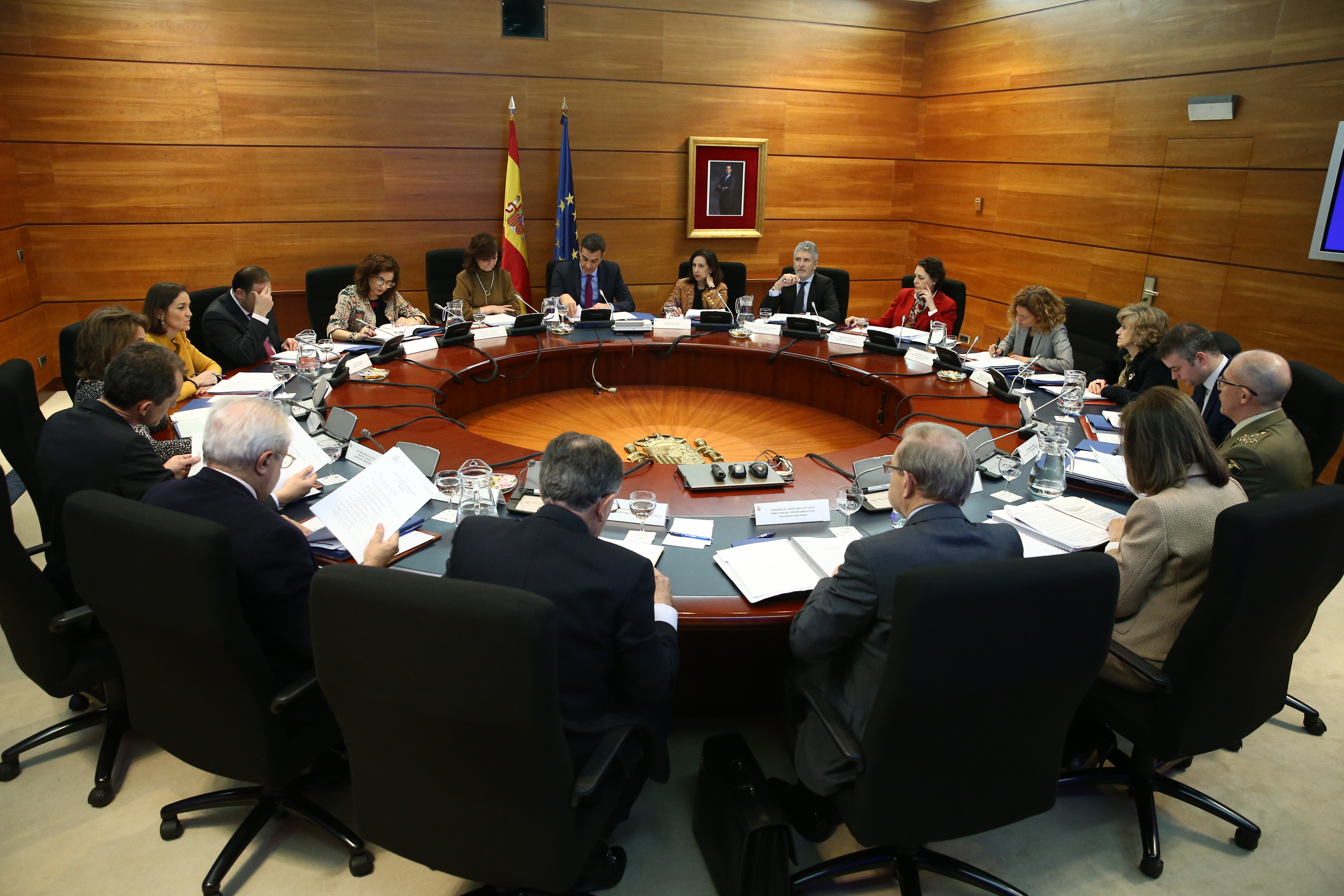
- A Council's meeting in 2019

Agency overview
- Formed: July 11, 2013; 13 years ago
- Preceding agency: Government Delegated Committee for Crisis Management (1986–2013)
- Jurisdiction: Spain
- Headquarters: Palace of Moncloa
- Agency executives: Felipe VI, Monarch (Co-Chair); Pedro Sánchez, Prime Minister (Co-Chair); Diego Rubio, Moncloa Chief of Staff (Secretary)
- Website: https://www.dsn.gob.es/

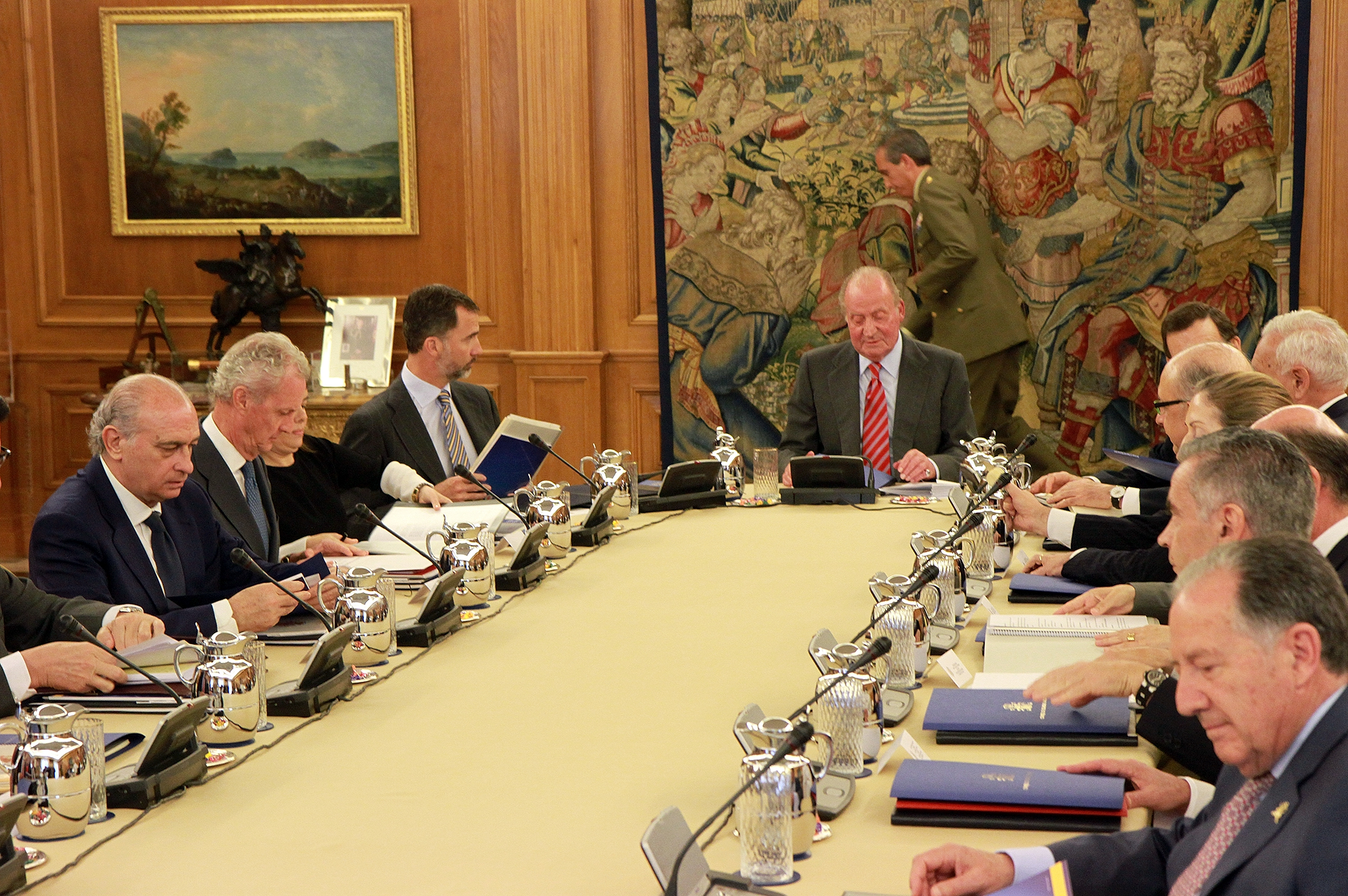
Constitutive session of the Council chaired by King Juan Carlos I and in which the Prince of Asturias, Felipe, also participated.

The National Security Council (Spanish: Consejo de Seguridad Nacional, CSN) is the advisory body used by the prime minister of Spain for consideration of national security and crisis management. It is based in the Palace of Moncloa, along with the Department of National Security.

It was established as a government delegated committee in 2013 by prime minister Mariano Rajoy to replace the Government Delegated Committee for Crisis Management within the framework of the 2012 National Security Strategy. CSN meetings are chaired by the prime minister, except when the monarch attends them.

== Functions ==
According to the National Security Act 36/2015 (LSN), CSN has the following functions:

- To dictate the necessary guidelines in the planning and coordination of the National Security policy.
- To direct and coordinate by Royal Decree the actions of management of crisis situations in the terms foreseen in Title III of the LSN.
- To supervise and coordinate, by Royal Decree, the National Security System.
- Verify the degree of compliance with the National Security Strategy and promote its revisions.
- Promote and encourage the development of the necessary second level strategies and, if necessary, proceed to their approval, as well as their periodic reviews.
- Organize by Royal Decree, the contribution of resources to National Security in accordance with the provisions of the LSN.
- To approve the Annual National Security Report before its presentation in the Cortes Generales.
- Agree the creation and strengthening of the necessary support organs for the performance of their functions.
- To promote the necessary normative proposals for the strengthening of the National Security System.
- Carry out the other functions attributed to it by the applicable legal and regulatory provisions.
- To advise and inform the Monarch at least once a year. The Sovereign will chair meetings when present.

In case of crisis:

- The National Security Council shall determine the liaison and coordination mechanisms necessary for the National Security System to be activated in a preventive manner and to monitor the situations likely to arise in a situation of National Security interest.
- In the situation of interest to the National Security, the President of the Government will call the National Security Council to exercise the functions of management and coordination of the management of said Situation, all without prejudice to the application of the legislation in matters of National Defense and of the powers that correspond to the Council of Ministers. In cases where the President of the Government decides to designate a functional authority for the promotion and coordinated management of the actions, the National Security Council will advise on the appointment of such authority.
- The National Security Council shall advise the President of the Government when the situation requires the application of exceptional measures provided for in the crisis management instruments of the international organizations of which Spain is a member, without prejudice to the powers of the Ministers and of the provisions in the legislation on National Defense.

== Membership ==
Image	Member	Office(s)
	Felipe VI (Co-Chair)	King of Spain
	Pedro Sánchez (Co-Chair)	Prime Minister
	Carlos Cuerpo	First Deputy Prime Minister; Minister of Economy, Trade and Business
	Yolanda Díaz	Second Deputy Prime Minister; Minister of Labour and Social Economy
	Sara Aagesen	Third Deputy Prime Minister; Minister for the Ecological Transition and the Demographic Challenge
	José Manuel Albares	Minister of Foreign Affairs, European Union and Cooperation
	Félix Bolaños	Minister of the Presidency, Justice and Relations with the Cortes; First Notary of the Kingdom; Secretary of the Council of Ministers
	Margarita Robles	Minister of Defence
	Arcadi España	Minister of Finance
	Fernando Grande-Marlaska	Minister of the Interior
	Óscar Puente	Minister of Transport and Sustainable Mobility
	Jordi Hereu	Minister of Industry and Tourism
	Mónica García	Minister of Health
	Diana Morant	Minister of Science, Innovation and Universities
	Óscar López	Minister for Digital Transformation and Civil Service
	Diego Rubio (Secretary)	Moncloa Chief of Staff
	Diego Martínez Belío	Secretary of State for Foreign Affairs
	Aina Calvo	Secretary of State for Security
	Admiral general Teodoro E. López Calderón	Chief of the Defence Staff
	Esperanza Casteleiro	Director of the National Intelligence Centre
	Brigadier general Loreto Gutiérrez Hurtado (Technical Secretary)	Director of the Department of National Security

== Sub-committees ==
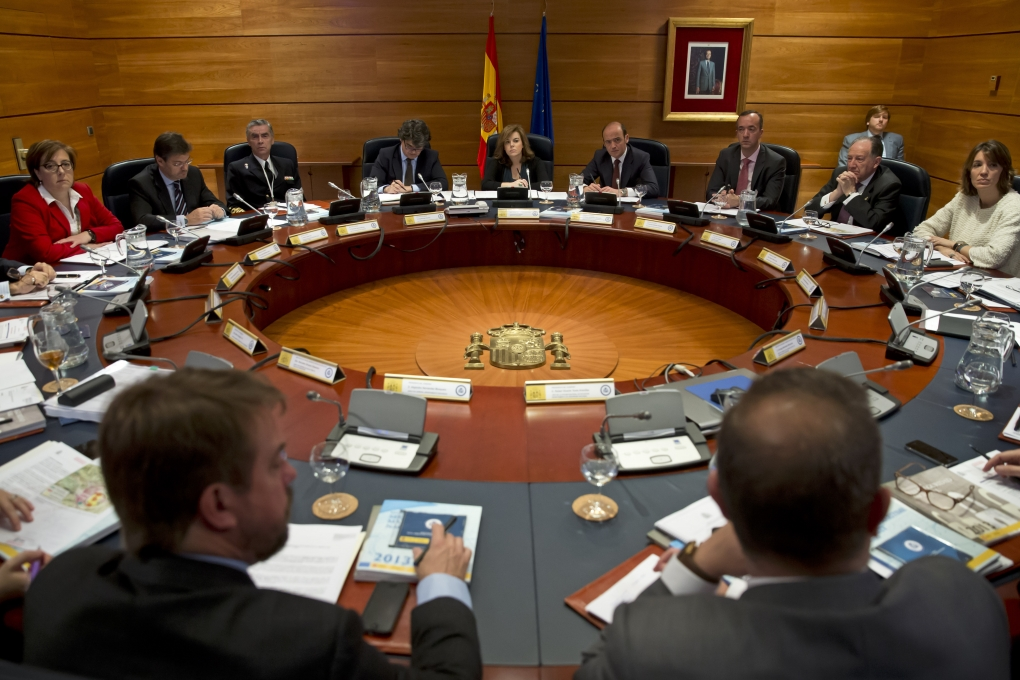
A meeting of the Situation Committee in 2014, chaired by Deputy PM Sáenz de Santamaría.

The National Security Act, in its article 21, section 1, letter h, grants the Council the power to create support bodies to carry out its functions.

Since 2013, nine support bodies have been created:

Name	Chair	Deputy Chair	Created
Situation Committee	The Minister of the Presidency	The Prime Minister's Chief of Staff	2013
National Cybersecurity Council	The Director of the National Intelligence Centre	The Director of the Department of National Security	2013
National Maritime Safety Council	The Chief of the Defence Staff	The Director of the Department of National Security	2013
Specialized Immigration Committee	The Secretary of State for Security	The Director of the Department of National Security	2017
Specialized Committee on Energy Security	The Secretary of State for Energy	The Director of the Department of National Security	2017
Specialized Non-Proliferation Committee	The Secretary of State for Foreign Affairs	The Director of the Department of National Security	2017
Specialized Committee against Terrorism	The Secretary of State for Security	The Director of the Department of National Security	2020
National Aerospace Safety Council	The Chief of the Defence Staff	The Director of the Department of National Security	2020
Specialized Committee against Organized Crime and Serious Crime	The Secretary of State for Security	The Director of the Department of National Security	2024

== Meetings ==
Since its inception, the National Security Council has convened 48 times.

Date	Place	Chair	Matters discussed	Ref.
11 July 2013	Zarzuela Palace	King Juan Carlos I	Constitutive meeting. Council's internal rules; National Security Act draft bill. Crown Prince Felipe also attended.	
20 September 2013	Moncloa Palace	Mariano Rajoy	International policy issues, specifically but not only about the Middle East. Procedural issues about the National Security Act draft bill.	
5 December 2013	Moncloa Palace	Mariano Rajoy	The Council approved the Cybersecurity and Maritime Safety Strategies and it created the Situation Committee and the National Maritime Safety and National Cybersecurity councils.	
14 February 2014	Moncloa Palace	Mariano Rajoy	The evolution of the strategies approved on previous meetings; the status of the international missions of the Armed Forces and the works on the National Security Act draft bill.	
25 April 2014	Moncloa Palace	Mariano Rajoy	National and international matters important to the national security and the approval of the first Annual Report about National Security.	
10 July 2014	Zarzuela Palace	King Felipe VI	To inform The King about the work made by the Council in its first year of life as well as discussing issues important to national security. The Council approved the creation of the Specialized Immigration Committee.	
31 October 2014	Moncloa Palace	Mariano Rajoy	Actions taken by the Special Committee about the Ébola virus. Issues relating to maritime safety, cybersecurity and immigration were also discussed.	
23 January 2015	Moncloa Palace	Mariano Rajoy	Jihadist terrorism and violent radicalization.	
24 April 2015	Moncloa Palace	Mariano Rajoy	National and international matters important to the national security. Among them, the migratory crisis in the Mediterranean and the situation in Libya (Libyan Civil War) stand out. The Council also approved the Annual Report about National Security and the National Plan to comply with the United Nations Resolution 1540.	
20 July 2015	Zarzuela Palace	King Felipe VI	National Security Act draft bill; humanitarian crisis in the Mediterranean and jihadist terrorism. The Council also approved the National Energy Security Strategy.	
14 November 2015	Moncloa Palace	Mariano Rajoy	Extraordinary meeting of the Council to discuss the November 2015 Paris attacks and the actions of the government in this matter.	
20 November 2015	Moncloa Palace	Mariano Rajoy	National and international matters important to the national security. Specifically, the government's measures in response to the 2015 Paris attacks were analyzed.	
27 May 2016	Moncloa Palace	Mariano Rajoy	Mediterranean migration crisis, refugees and measures taken by Spain; jihadist terrorism; Venezuela's situation. The Council approved the Annual Report about National Security.	
20 January 2017	Moncloa Palace	Mariano Rajoy	National and international matters important to the national security. Specifically, jihadist terrorism and consequences of the bad weather in the country. It was also discussed the instability of certain geographical areas important to the Spanish national security; the Council approved the 2016 Annual Report; and the works to the new National Security Strategy were started. The Council approved the creation of the Specialized Committee on Energy Security.	
1 December 2017	Moncloa Palace	Mariano Rajoy	National and international matters important to the national security. The Council approved the new National Security Strategy and the creation of the Specialized Committee on the Non-Proliferation of Weapons of Mass Destruction. It also discussed the accession of Spain to the PESCO Program.	
16 July 2018	Zarzuela Palace	King Felipe VI	Mediterranean migration crisis; jihadist terrorism and the international deployment of the Armed Forces.	
21 January 2019	Moncloa Palace	Pedro Sánchez	First meeting held in the new facilities of the Department of National Security. The Council discussed and approved the National Strategy against Organized Crime and Serious Crime 2019-2023, the National Bio-custody Plan (for the effective custody of relevant biological agents, controlling their access and the physical protection of the facilities where these agents are handled, as well as their safe transport) and the new National Strategy Against Terrorism.	
15 March 2019	Moncloa Palace	Pedro Sánchez	The Council approved the 2018 Annual Report about National Security, the Maritime Safety Action Plan and it also discussed procedures to prevent fake news. The Secretary of State for Press was convened to the meeting for the first time.	
12 April 2019	Moncloa Palace	Pedro Sánchez	The Council discussed and approved three new strategies: on Aerospace Safety, Civil Defence and Cybersecurity; and it created the Coordination Network for Electoral Processes Security.	
4 March 2020	Zarzuela Palace	King Felipe VI	To inform The King about national security issues as well discuss them. The Council approved the creation of the National Aerospace Safety Council and the Specialized Committee against Terrorism.	
22 June 2020	Zarzuela Palace	King Felipe VI	To inform The King about national security issues and to analyze the situation relating the COVID-19 pandemic.	
6 October 2020	Moncloa Palace	Pedro Sánchez	The Council discussed the situation of the COVID-19 pandemic, it approved new procedures for the new National Security and Energy Safety strategies and it approved a new Procedure for Action against Disinformation. Likewise, the Council approved the creation of a strategic reserve of national capacities for industrial production and the national strategic plans for the Prevention and Fight against Violent Radicalization and the Fight Against the Financing of Terrorism.	
9 March 2021	Moncloa Palace	Pedro Sánchez	National security and immigration issues; COVID-19 pandemic and vaccination; terrorism; cybercrime and cybersecurity.	
18 November 2021	Zarzuela Palace	King Felipe VI	To inform The King about national security issues. Among other issues, the proposal to update the National Security Strategy 2021 and the National Cybersecurity Plan were discussed.	
24 February 2022	Zarzuela Palace	King Felipe VI	The CSN discussed matters related to the Russian invasion of Ukraine.	
4 March 2022	Moncloa Palace	Pedro Sánchez	Meeting to analyze the evolution of the invasion of Ukraine and the arrival of refugees from this country to Spain.	
21 June 2022	Moncloa Palace	Pedro Sánchez	Mainly, the war in Ukraine and its national and international effects were discussed. Likewise, topics such as terrorism and maritime security were also addressed.	
11 October 2022	Moncloa Palace	Pedro Sánchez	As in this year's meetings, the Russian invasion and its consequences were discussed.	
11 February 2023	Moncloa Palace	Pedro Sánchez	The Russian invasion of Ukraine was discussed, as well as the fight against the illicit enrichment of criminal organizations and delinquents, and the development of the National Strategy against the Proliferation of Weapons of Mass Destruction.	
12 April 2023	Zarzuela Palace	King Felipe VI	Among other issues, the situation in Ukraine and the regulation of the National Aerospace Safety Council were discussed.	
19 March 2024	Moncloa Palace	Pedro Sánchez	The Annual National Security Report for the year 2023 was approved, as well as the new national strategies against Terrorism and Maritime Security. Likewise, the international situation regarding the Russian invasion of Ukraine and the war in Gaza was discussed.	
16 April 2024	Moncloa Palace	Félix Bolaños	Topics related to the Recovery, Transformation and Resilience Plan as well as digitalization were discussed. At the meeting, the National Security Scheme for 5G networks and services was approved.	
26 August 2024	Moncloa Palace	Félix Bolaños	Unspecified.	
15 October 2024	Zarzuela Palace	King Felipe VI	In addition to discussing current international conflicts, the new National Civil Protection Strategy was approved, as well as the creation of the Specialized Committee against Organized and Serious Crime, and the rules for developing the Aerospace Security Strategy.	
28 January 2025	Moncloa Palace	Pedro Sánchez	Ttopics related to active international conflicts and the activities of the specialized committees that advise the National Security Council were discussed. The groundwork was also laid for the development of the National Strategy to Fight Disinformation .	
24 April 2025	Zarzuela Palace	King Felipe VI	The Council agreed to proceed with the review and update of the National Security Strategy.	
28 April 2025	Moncloa Palace	Pedro Sánchez	Extraordinary meeting at 3:00 p.m. (CEST) to analyze and make decisions related to the situation caused by a massive blackout in the country.	
28 April 2025	Moncloa Palace	Pedro Sánchez	Extraordinary meeting at 7:00 p.m. (CEST) to analyze and make decisions related to the situation caused by a massive blackout in the country.	
29 April 2025	Moncloa Palace	King Felipe VI	Extraordinary meeting at 9:00 a.m. (CEST) to analyze and make decisions related to the situation caused by a massive blackout in the country.	
29 April 2025	Moncloa Palace	Pedro Sánchez	Extraordinary meeting at 2:00 p.m. (CEST) to analyze and make decisions related to the situation caused by a massive blackout in the country.	
29 April 2025	Moncloa Palace	Pedro Sánchez	Extraordinary meeting at 7:00 p.m. (CEST) to analyze and make decisions related to the situation caused by a massive blackout in the country.	
30 April 2025	Moncloa Palace	Pedro Sánchez	Extraordinary meeting to analyze and make decisions related to the situation caused by a massive blackout in the country.	
17 June 2025	Moncloa Palace	Pedro Sánchez	The report on the causes of the blackout of April 28, 2025, prepared by the Interministerial Committee led by the Ministry for the Ecological Transition and the Demographic Challenge, was presented.	
14 July 2025	Moncloa Palace	Pedro Sánchez	The situation in Ukraine and the Middle East was analyzed. Likewise, the new strategies against Organized Crime and Delinquency and Aerospace Security were approved, and the draft of the National Plan against the Financing of the Proliferation of Weapons of Mass Destruction was analyzed.	
16 December 2025	Moncloa Palace	Pedro Sánchez	The activity of the Situation Committee was discussed, the roadmap for strengthening resilience against crises within the framework of the National Security System was approved, and initiatives of the National Cybersecurity Council were addressed, among other issues.	
21 April 2026	Moncloa Palace	Pedro Sánchez	Among other matters, issues related to cyber threats and cybersecurity were discussed, and the 2025 Annual Security Report was approved.	
25 August 2026	Moncloa Palace	Pedro Sánchez	2026 Ceuta migrant crisis	
1 September 2026	Moncloa Palace	Pedro Sánchez	2026 Ceuta migrant crisis	
