= José Enrique Serrano Martínez =

Spanish politician (1949–2025)

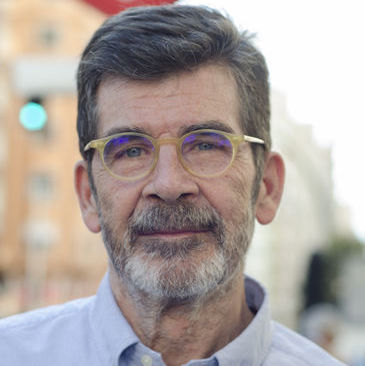
Serrano in 2016

José Enrique Serrano Martínez (25 July 1949 – 10 June 2025) was a Spanish politician and member of the Spanish Socialist Workers' Party (PSOE).

== Life and career ==
Serrano was chief of staff to former prime ministers Felipe González and José Luis Rodríguez Zapatero and a member of the teams of Joaquín Almunia, Alfredo Pérez Rubalcaba, and Pedro Sánchez in the PSOE.

Serrano died on 10 June 2025, at the age of 75.
