= Moncloa Chief of Staff =

- Director del Gabinete del Presidente del Gobierno
- Moncloa Palace's logo

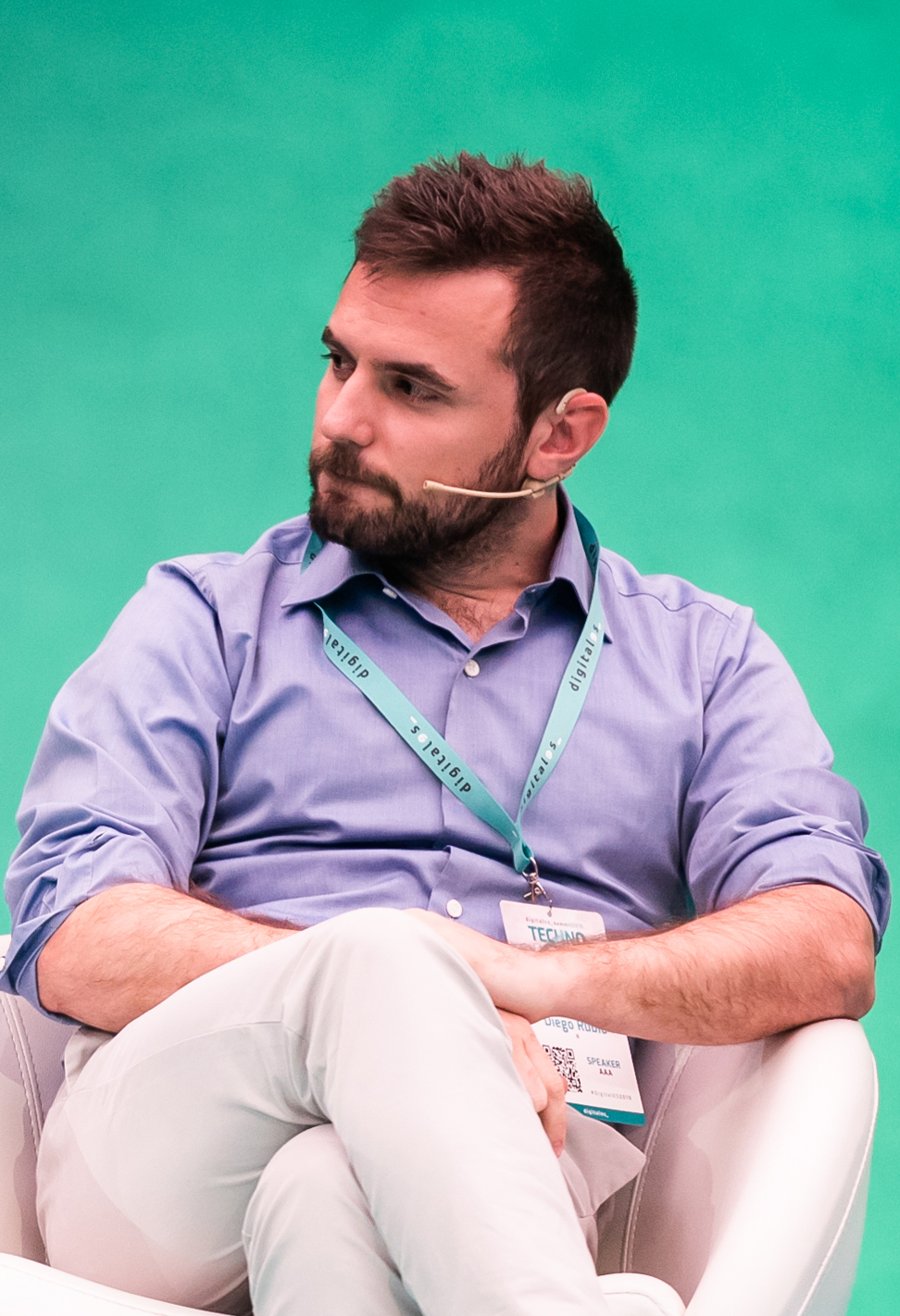
- Incumbent; Diego Rubio Rodríguez since September 11, 2024
- Office of the Prime Minister
- Style: The Most Excellent
- Member of: Cabinet Office; General Commission of Secretaries of State and Undersecretaries; National Security Council
- Reports to: The Prime Minister
- Appointer: The Monarch
- Formation: July 19, 1976 (50 years ago)
- First holder: Carmen Díez de Rivera
- Deputy: Moncloa Deputy Chief of Staff
- Website: La Moncloa

The Moncloa Chief of Staff, officially called Director of the Prime Minister's Cabinet (Note: It is also commonly referred to as "Director of the Cabinet of the Office of the Prime Minister" (Spanish: Director del Gabinete de la Presidencia del Gobierno).), is the most senior political appointee in the Office of the Prime Minister of Spain. The chief of staff, with the rank of secretary of state, is appointed by the Prime Minister as its senior aide. This position has no executive authority although it is the principal advisor to the prime minister and it coordinates the work action of the different government departments, as well as lead the Cabinet Office.

There is not a legal requirement for this role to exist but, since Adolfo Suárez in 1976, each prime minister has appointed a person of their trust to this role. The chief of staff chairs the Steering Committee of the Prime Minister's Office (Spanish: Comité de Dirección de la Presidencia del Gobierno), a body established in 2020 to "coordinate the advisory [bodies] and support the Prime Minister's Office activities" and it is integrated by all the high-ranking officials of the Office.

Also, the chief of staff is a member of the General Commission of Secretaries of State and Undersecretaries and of the National Security Council—of which he is secretary.

== Role ==
In the case of Spain, the chief of staff is a political position held by people close to the prime minister, but with less public relevance than their counterparts in the United States [White House Chief of Staff] or Germany [Head of the Federal Chancellery], among others, since, in Spain, the chief of staff usually has an almost "invisible" role, not being part of the Council of Ministers, with few appearances in the press and, on many occasions, without accompanying the head of government at public events—with the exception of some such as Jorge Moragas.

Although initially the role of this position was not strictly regulated, it now has very well-defined functions outlined in the royal decrees that the prime minister approves at the beginning of each term to organize their working environment, that is, the Office of the Prime Minister. This regulatory evolution has been made possible by the evolution of the Prime Minister's Office itself, but it has always shared one common element: the chief of staff's power comes from what the prime minister chooses to grant them.

Thus, the position has gone from having a minor regulation and the administrative rank of director-general during the premierships of Adolfo Suárez and Leopoldo Calvo-Sotelo, to being a key player in matters as important as national security or crisis management since the premiership of José Luis Rodríguez Zapatero, reaching its highest level of authority during the premiership of Pedro Sánchez, who created a Steering Committee that place under the control of the chief of staff, among other bodies, both the Secretariat of State for Press and the General Secretariat of the Prime Minister's Office—which had been under the chief of staff since 2017 and from which the chief of staff had been stealing responsibilities for some time—. For this, the chief of staff currently constitutes the center of power of the Prime Minister's Office.

== Cabinet Office ==
The chief of staff heads the Cabinet Office (or Prime Minister's Cabinet). As of 2026, the Cabinet Office is composed by:

- The Office of Moncloa Deputy Chief of Staff.
  - The Department of National Security.
- The General Secretariat of the Prime Minister's Office.
- The General Secretariat for National Policy.
- The General Secretariat for Institutional Relations and Citizens.
- The Department for European Affairs.
- The Department for Foreign Affairs.

== List of chiefs of staff ==
Since the position was established, 13 people have served as such. Of these, only Carmen Díez de Rivera, its first holder, has been a woman. José Enrique Serrano Martínez is the only one to have held the position for two different terms, making him one of the longest-serving holders—eight and a half years—though not surpassing Roberto Dorado Zamorano, who held the position for 10 years, 228 days. José Luis Ayllón served the shortest term as head of the President's Cabinet, with 133 days in office.

#	Name	Term	Prime Minister
1	Carmen Díez de Rivera	1976–1977	Adolfo Suárez
2	Alberto Aza Arias	1977–1981	Adolfo Suárez
3	Eugenio Galdón Brugarolas	1981-1982	Leopoldo Calvo-Sotelo
4	Roberto Dorado Zamorano	1982–1993	Felipe González
5	Antonio Zabalza Martí	1993–1995	Felipe González
6	José Enrique Serrano Martínez	1995–1996	Felipe González
7	Carlos Aragonés Mendiguchía	1996–2004	José María Aznar
8	José Enrique Serrano Martínez	2004–2011	José Luis Rodríguez Zapatero
9	Jorge Moragas Sánchez	2011–2017	Mariano Rajoy Brey
10	José Luis Ayllón	2017–2018	Mariano Rajoy Brey
11	Iván Redondo	2018–2021	Pedro Sánchez
12	Óscar López Águeda	2021–2024	Pedro Sánchez
13	Diego Rubio Rodríguez	2024–pres.	Pedro Sánchez

== List of deputy chiefs of staff ==
1. Francisco Fernández Marugán (1982–1984)
2. Ignacio Varela Díaz (1989–1995)
3. Miquel Iceta (1995–1996)
4. Gabriel Elorriaga Pisarik (1996–2000)
5. Alfredo Timermans (2000–2002)
6. Javier Fernández-Lasquetty (2002–2004)
7. Enrique Guerrero Salom (2004–2008)
8. José Miguel Vidal Zapatero (2008–2011)
9. Alfonso de Senillosa (2011–2018)
10. Cristina Ysasi-Ysasmendi Pemán (2018)
11. Andrea Gavela Llopis (2018–2020)
12. Francisco José Salazar Rodríguez (2020–2021)
13. Llanos Castellanos (2021)
14. Antonio Hernando (2021–2023)
15. María José Pérez Ruiz (2023)
16. Antonio Hernando (2023–2024)
17. Ángel Alonso Arroba (since 2024)

== Bibliography ==
- Garrido, A.; Martínez, M. A. (2018). "El poder en Moncloa: el jefe de Gabinete del presidente del Gobierno" [The power in Moncloa: The Chief of Staff to the President of the Government]. Revista Española de Ciencia Política (in Spanish) (48): 73–102. doi:10.21308/recp.48.03. ISSN 1575-6548 – via RECYT.
