= Instituto Español de Estudios Estratégicos =

Spanish think tank and research institute

- Instituto Español de Estudios Estratégicos

Agency overview
- Formed: 1970
- Headquarters: Paseo de la Castellana, Madrid; 40°26′38″N 3°41′29″W
- Minister responsible: Ministerio de Defensa
- Parent agency: Centro Superior de Estudios de la Defensa Nacional
- Website: ieee.es

Instituto Español de Estudios Estratégicos (IEEE) is the research center about Strategic studies of the Ministerio de Defensa of Spain who is responsible for coordinating, promoting and disseminating the cultural action of the ministry. It is part of the Centro Superior de Estudios de la Defensa Nacional (CESEDEN).

Its publications are Cuadernos de Estrategia, Panorama Estratégico, Energía y Geoestrategia, and Revista Digital.
