= Manuel Muñiz =

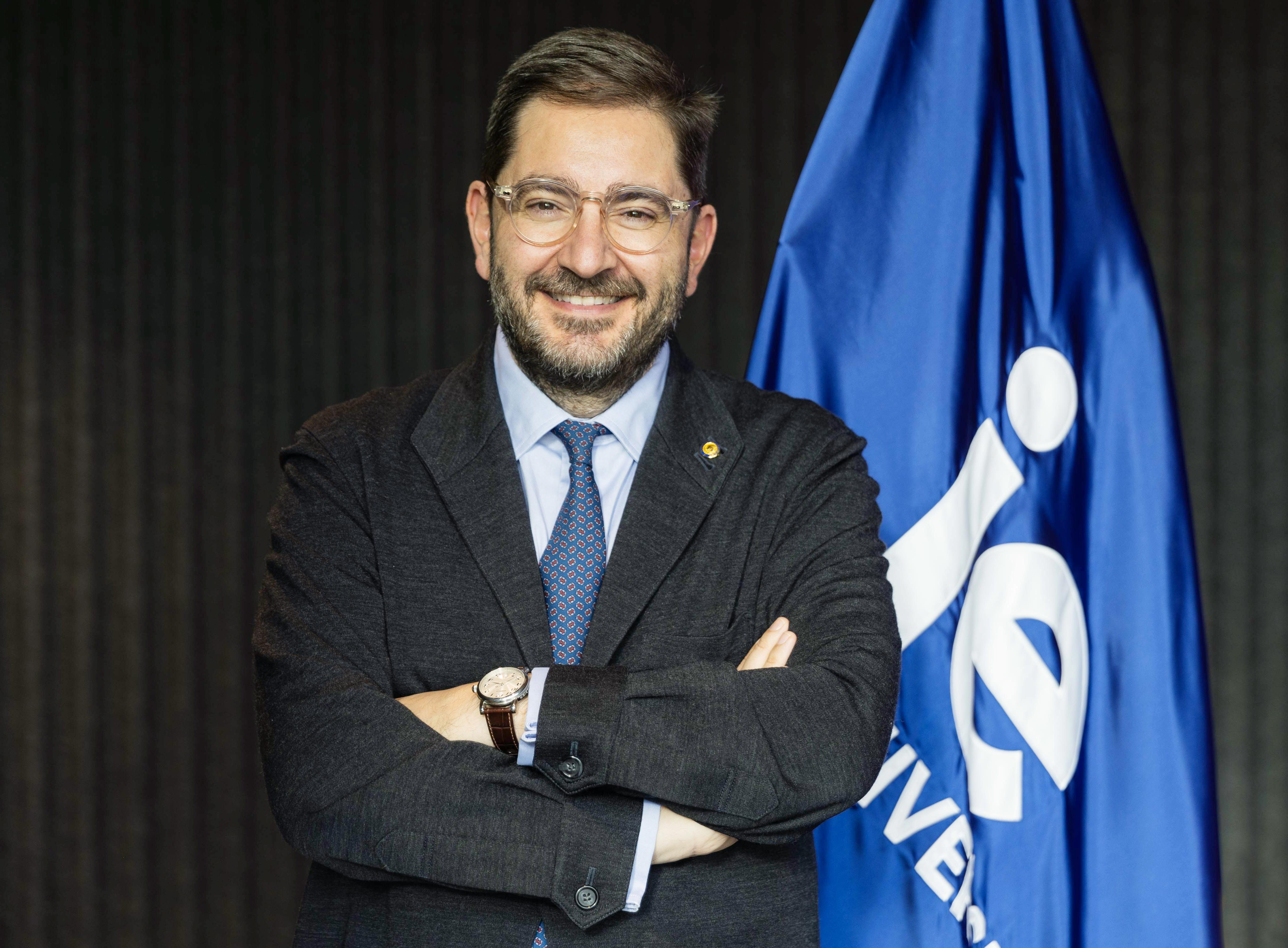

Secretary of State for Global Spain
- In office 7 February 2020 – 14 July 2021
- Preceded by: Irene Lozano
- Succeeded by: Position abolished

Personal details
- Born: 19 May 1983 (age 43)

Manuel Muñiz Villa (born 19 May 1983) is a Spanish lawyer, academic administrator, and international relations scholar and is currently the Rector of IE University and Chair of the Board of the IE New York College.

From 2017 to 2020 and from 2021 to 2024 he served as Dean of the IE School of Global and Public Affairs (IE University) in Madrid, Spain, and was elected President of the Association of Professional Schools of International Affairs. Muñiz served as the second Secretary of State for Global Spain in the Ministry of Foreign Affairs, European Union and Cooperation from 2020 to 2021.

== Education ==
Manuel Muñiz studied at Runnymede College in Madrid. He then completed a Juris Doctor and was accepted into the Madrid Bar.

Muñiz furthered his studies with a Master of Science in Financial Markets from the Instituto de Estudios Bursátiles (2009) in Madrid and a Master in Public Administration at Harvard University's John F. Kennedy School of Government (2011). In addition, he joined the Centre de recherches internationales (CERI) of Sciences Po in Paris, France, as a research fellow in 2012 before completing a DPhil (PhD) in International Relations at the University of Oxford, with a particular focus on European foreign and security policy (2016).

== Career ==
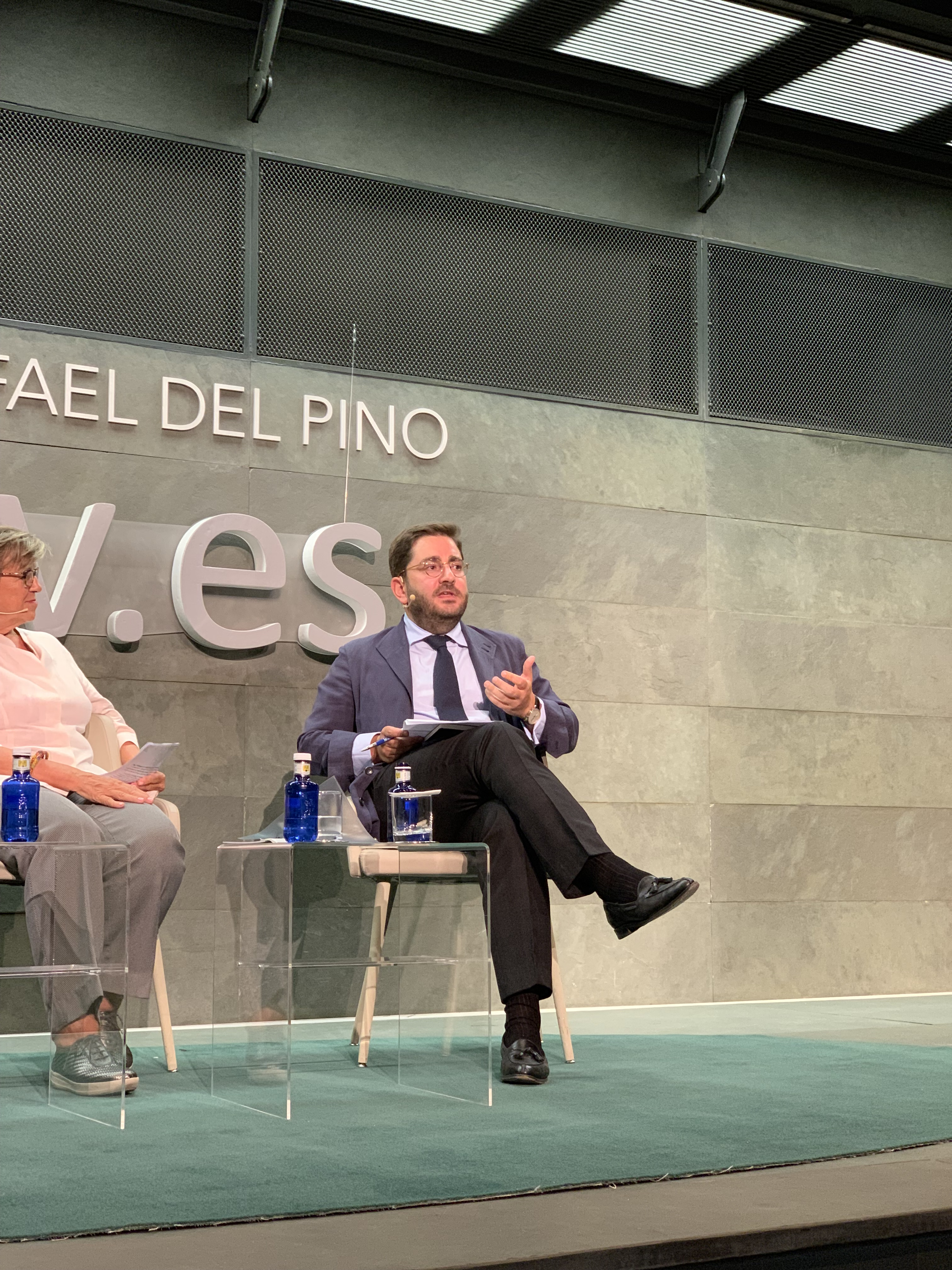
Muñiz at a conference at the Rafael del Pino Foundation.

In 2014, Muñiz joined the Fundación Rafael del Pino in Madrid, Spain as Director of the Foundation's Global Leadership Program with the goal of training Spanish leaders in the field of global affairs. In 2015, he worked as a consultant for the UN Support Mission in Libya and provided advice on security matters.

From 2015 to 2017, Muñiz was the Director of the Program on Transatlantic Relations at Harvard University's Weatherhead Center for International Affairs and, between 2016 and 2017, he was also a lecturer on the geopolitical consequences of the rise of populism at Tufts University. During this time, he was selected by Esglobal as one of the 25 intellectuals redefining Iberoamerican thought.

Muñiz was subsequently appointed a Senior Associate at Harvard University's Belfer Center for Science and International Affairs, where he was one of the promoters of the Project on Europe and the Transatlantic Relationship, aimed at strengthening the university's capacities for teaching, research, and policy on the relationship between the United States and Europe.

=== Period as Dean of the IE School of Global and Public Affairs ===
In 2017, Muñiz became the Dean of the IE School of Global and Public Affairs and founded the IE Centre for the Governance of Change to examine the challenges exerted by accelerated societal and technological transformation on both the public and private sectors. During his tenure as Dean, first from 2017 to 2020, and then from 2021 to 2024, the school expanded its academic footprint to 20 full-time programmes. The number of enrolled students rose to over 1900, and the amount of internal faculty to almost 40. Moreover, annual scholarships increased to more than 2.5 million euros.

=== Period as Secretary of State ===
In January 2020, the Council of Ministers of the Government of Spain approved Muñiz's designation as Secretary of State for Global Spain, in replacement of Irene Lozano. The powers of the State Secretariat were extended to include economic diplomacy with a marked emphasis on fighting the impact of COVID-19 on the Spanish economy. He assumed office on 7 February. Once in office, he became part of the Committee of Experts advising the Spanish government on the COVID-19 pandemic.

Muñiz coordinated the crafting of "Spain's Foreign Action Strategy 2021-2024" and led the efforts for the composition of the first National Strategy on Technology and Global Order, a document which aimed to launch Spain's Technology Diplomacy. He also led work at the OECD on the approval of a global mobility framework aimed at minimising the economic impact of COVID-19, and was the coordinator of Spain's OECD Ministerial Presidency during 2020.

As the Foreign Ministry's spokesperson, he held regular appointments with the media through briefings with the Spanish and international press and led the Ministry's communication efforts, including those aimed at improving Spain's image abroad.

On July 11, 2021, he voluntarily resigned from the post of Secretary of State for Global Spain, following the announcement of the dismissal of the hitherto minister, Arancha González Laya. He then returned to IE University as Provost of the institution and Dean of its School of Politics, Economics and Global Affairs, a position he held until 2024 when we was succeeded by former Italian Prime Minister Enrico Letta.

Muñiz is a member of the European Council on Foreign Relations and a permanent member of the Royal European Academy of Doctors.

In 2024, he was awarded the Spanish Grand Cross of the Order of Civil Merit.

== Research ==
Dr. Muñiz started his academic career working on European integration, with a particular focus on transatlantic relations, security and defence. He has also studied what he terms the "Anti-Elite Era", the rise of populism, and the implosion of the International Liberal Order. As part of that process of changes in the international order, he has looked at the role of China, and the technological Cold War emerging between China and the United States.

Muñiz's work has focused extensively on the impact of technology on the social contract and on the global order. His fundamental thesis is that rapid technological change has led to a fracturing of the social contract through the hollowing out of the Western middle class and, ultimately, the rise of populist politics. He has openly called for the crafting of a new social contract for the digital era in which inequities are addressed and technological change is governed through foresight and the development of a science of anticipation.

In 2023 he was appointed a Senior Fellow at the Brookings Institution.

=== Essays ===
- Muñiz, M. (2023). "N°90 - La Era de la Inteligencia Artificial - 14 de diciembre de 2023 - Vanguardia Dossier - Dossier".
- Muñiz, M. (2023). “Dancing with separatists: Can Spain’s new government last?,” The Brookings Institution
- Muñiz, M. (2023). “Diplomacia tecnológica para la era digital”, Revista CIDOB d’Afers Internacionals, n.º 134 (September 2023), p. 91-10
- Muñiz, M. (2023). “AI, Democracy and the Global Order,” (joint with Samir Saran), Project Syndicate
- Muñiz, M. (2023). “Perspectives transatlantiques sur un ordre mondial fracture,” (Transatlantic perspectives on a fracturing global order), Politique étrangère, vol. 88, n° 1, printemps 2023
- Muñiz, M. (2022). “La desintermediación de la diplomacia,” (The desintermediation of diplomacy), Estudios de Política Exterior, Issue 208, July/August, pp. 2–13
- Muñiz, M. (2022). “Technology and the Global Struggle for Democracy,” Project Syndicate
- Muñiz, M. (2021). “Por una España más global,” (A more global Spain), Estudios de Política Exterior, Issue 200, Marzo/Abril, pp. 90–103
- Muñiz, M. (2020). “Diplomacia económica para un nuevo Contrato Social,” (Economic Diplomacy for a New Social Contract), El País
- Muñiz, M. (2020). “Tecnología y orden global,” (Technology and Global Order), Estudios de Politica Exterior, Issue 193, Enero/Febrero, pp. 2–14
- Muñiz, M. (2019). “Orden Global, Tecnología y la Geopolítica del Cambio,” (Global Order, Technology and the Geopolitics of Change), Anuario Internacional CIDOB, pp. 16–24
- Muñiz, M. (2019). “The Coming Technological Cold War,” (La Guerra Fría Tecnológica que se avecina), Project Syndicate
- Muñiz, M. (2019). "Technology for better governance". (joint with Idoia Ortiz), The education times, Times of India
- Muñiz, M. (2018). "Tecnología y Orden Global". (Technology and Global Order), El país
- Muñiz, M. (2018). "El retorno de la Historia". (The return of History), ABC
- Muñiz, M. (2018). "Domestic enemies and the Collapse of the Transatlantic Order". Atlantic Community
- Muñiz, M. (2017). “Le triangle de distribution emplois-productivité-revenu ne fonctionne plus,” (The Distribution Triangle of Employment-Productivity-Income Does not Work Any More), Le Monde
- Muñiz, M. (2017). “Economic Growth is No Longer Enough,” (El crecimiento económico ya no es suficiente), Project Syndicate
- Muñiz, M., Kaiser, K., Lastra, C., Meyer, H., and Torres, M. (2017). “Technological Change, Inequality and the Collapse of the Liberal Order,” (Cambio tencológico, desigualdad y el colapso del Orden Liberal) G20 Insights, Policy Brief
- Muñiz, M. (2017). "El Futuro del Gobierno y de la Acción Pública en el Siglo XXI," (The Future of Government and of Public Administration), Revista Información Comercial Económica (ICE), Issue 891, pp 7–19.
- Muñiz, M. (2017). “El colapso del orden liberal,” (The Collapse of the Liberal Order), Estudios de Politica Exterior, Issue 175, Enero/Febrero, pp. 2–13
- Muñiz, M. (2017). “Could Spain help fix Europe?,” (Podría España solucionar los problemas de Europa?) The Washington Post
- Muñiz, M. (2016). “Populism and the Need for a New Social Contract,” (El ascenso del populismo y un nuevo Contrato Social), Social Europe
- Muñiz, M. (2016). "La era anti-elites", (The Anti-Elite Era), Estudios de Política Exterior, Issue 172, Julio/Agosto, pp. 46–52
- Muñiz, M. (2016). "La confusión de EEUU en un mundo desordenado." (The confusion of the EEUU in a chaotic world). Estudios de Política Exterior, Issue 170, Marzo/Abril 2016, pp 139–143
- Muñiz, M. (2014). "Progreso Tecnológico y Orden Internacional: hacia una nueva economía y una mejor gobernanza." (Technological Progress and the International Order: towards a new economy and better governance). (joint with Alexandre Pérez Casares), Revista Información Comercial Económica (ICE), Issue 880, pp 39–55
- Muñiz, M. (2014). "Redefining the Transatlantic Security Relationship" (joint with Anne Marie LeGloannec), Transworld Working Paper 38, pp 1–39
- Muñiz, M. (2013). "Why Europe, too, needs an Asia pivot". (joint with Karl Kaiser), Europe´s World Journal, Issue 24, pp - 92–96

=== Monographs and book chapters ===
- Muniz, M (2020). "A New Social Contract for the Digital Age," in The Work Revolution, BBVA Open Mind, Turner, pp. 106–118
- Muniz, M (2019). "La Implosión del Orden Liberal," (The Implosion of the Liberal Order), in "Gobernanza futura: hiperglobalización, mundo multipolar y Estados menguantes," Cuaderno de Estrategia, 199, Instituto Español de Estudios Estratégicos
- Muniz, M (2018). "The Governance of Change: How Companies and Governments Should Adapt to Technological Disruption," in Iñiguez, Santiago and Kazuo, Ichijo eds. Business Despite Borders, Palgrave McMillan, pp. 21–33
- Muniz, M (2016). "Explaining security and defence integration: the case of Europe," [PhD thesis]. University of Oxford
