= History of the Future =

History of the Future may refer to:

== Books ==
- A History of the Future, an 1830s science-fiction novel by Adam Mickiewicz, destroyed by the author, some fragments are preserve
- A History of the Future (novel), a 2014 novel by James Howard Kunstler
- Franklin Furnace & the Spirit of the Avant-Garde: A History of the Future, by Toni Sant 2011
- Volume 4: A History of the Future, a 2011 compilation of Air (comics)

== Film, TV and radio ==
- "The History of the Future", a 2004 episode of the BBC radio comedy The Museum of Everything
- The History of the Future, a 2012 BBC radio series presented by Juliet Gardiner
- History of the Future Museum, a Star Trek museum
- A History of the Future (TV series), a 2019 documentary series

== Music ==
- History of the Future, working title for the Yes album Talk
- History of the Future, a 2001 album by Ricky Skaggs
- History of the Future, a 2013 compilation album by The Orb
- History of the Future (album), 2017 by Watter

== Other ==
- The History of the Future, a 2012 artwork by The Propeller Group

== See also ==
- A Short History of the Future (disambiguation)
