= A Short History of the Future (disambiguation) =

A Short History of the Future a 1989 book by the American historian W. Warren Wagar.

A Short History of the Future or A Brief History of the Future may also refer to:

- The book A Brief History of the Future: Origins of the Internet by the Irish academic and journalist John Naughton (2000)
- A Brief History of the Future, speculative futurology book about the next 50 years by Jacques Attali
- A Brief History of the Future (TV series)
- A book A Short History of the Future by the British journalist John Langdon-Davies (1936)
- The book A Short History of the Future: Surviving the 2030 Spike by the Australian journalist Colin Mason (2006)

== See also ==
- History of the Future (disambiguation)
