= W. Warren Wagar =

American historian (1932–2004)

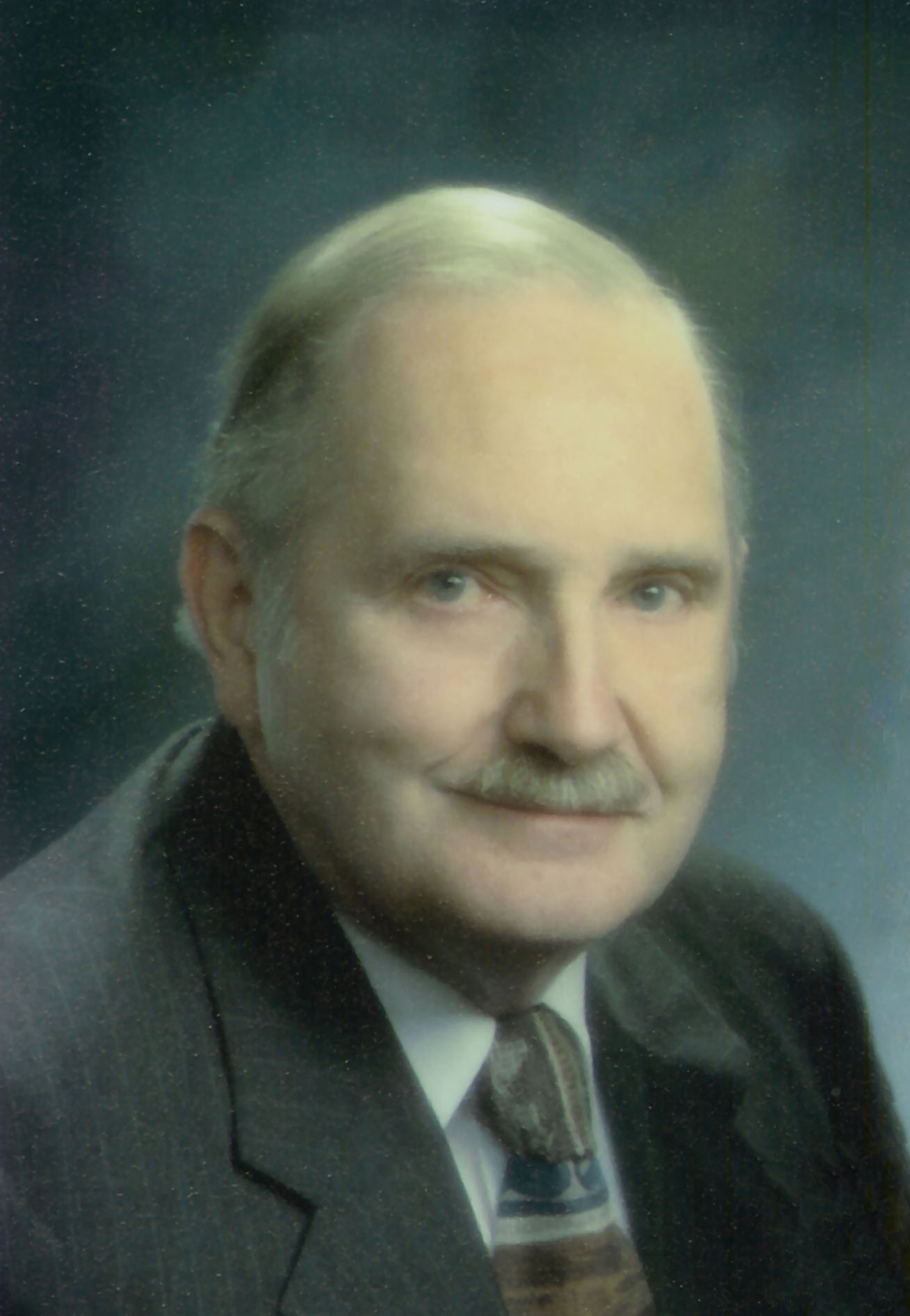
W. Warren Wagar, 2003

Walter Warren Wagar (June 5, 1932, Baltimore, Maryland – November 16, 2004, Vestal, New York), better known as W. Warren Wagar, was an American historian and futures studies scholar.

== Life ==
A specialist in alternative society futures and an expert in the work of pioneering science fiction writer H.G. Wells, Wagar served as history professor at Binghamton University, State University of New York, for 31 years, after graduating from Yale University. His courses on the history of the future and World War III earned him the title of Distinguished Teaching Professor at Binghamton.

Wagar began writing science fiction in 1984, publishing nine stories in various magazines and anthologies. He wrote four articles for The Futurist, contributed to a discussion on terrorism in the January–February 2002 issue, served on the editorial board for Futures Research Quarterly, and spoke at several World Future Society conferences.

Wagar published 18 books.

== Work on H. G. Wells ==
A thought is fully as much an event as a war, and thinking falls into observable patterns which, in turn, have histories of their own, no less a part of the ongoing life of humanity than the more conventional subject matter of historical research.

Wagar's work on H. G. Wells began with his doctoral dissertation, which was published as H. G. Wells and the World State (1961), a study of Wells's political philosophy. He subsequently collected a volume of Wells essays and extracts in H. G. Wells: Journalism and Prophecy (1963), edited a critical edition of Wells's The Open Conspiracy (2001) and finally published H.G. Wells: Traversing Time, which traces Wells's philosophies on utopia, war, romance, education, and modernism, focusing on his nonfiction and general fiction as well as his science fiction. For these, and many essays on Wells in such scholarly journals as Science Fiction Studies and The Wellsian, Wagar was made a vice-president of the H. G. Wells Society.

== Single works ==
=== The City of Man ===
The City of Man (1963) sees the imminent collapse of world civilization, which he regarded as an excellent opportunity: "There is no more opportune moment for radical change than in the aftermath of a world catastrophe".

=== A Short History of the Future ===
In A Short History of the Future (1989), a narrative account of the imagined events of the next 200 years, Wagar foresaw the Soviet Union enjoying another 55 years of existence. In the second edition of the book he ruefully recounted how the first edition had only just gone to press when the Soviet Union collapsed.

== Quotes ==
In light of the time factor, if nothing else, it behooves fastidious fence-sitting humanists to make a second look at the world-views already in being, and to ask if any of them has the energy, the breadth, and — why not? — the battalions to lead the way to an ethically acceptable world civilization without undergoing any fundamental reconception or requiring the appearance of new transcendental prophet-heroes.

— W. Warren Wagar 1975

== Editions ==
- Wagar, W. Warren (1963). The City of Man; Prophecies of a World Civilization in Twentieth-Century Thought. Boston: Houghton Mifflin. (Entry at World Cat)
- Wagar, W. Warren (1982). Terminal Visions: The Literature of Last Things. Bloomington: Indiana University Press. ISBN 0-253-35847-7.
- Wagar, W. Warren (1999). A Short History of the Future, 3rd ed. University Of Chicago Press. ISBN 0-226-86903-2.
- Wagar, W. Warren (2004). H.G. Wells: Traversing Time. Middletown, Conn: Wesleyan University Press. ISBN 0-8195-6725-6.
- Wagar, W. Warren (1992). The next three futures paradigms of things to come. Adamantine Press. (Entry at World Cat)
- Wells, H. G.; W. Warren Wagar (2002). The Open Conspiracy: H.G. Wells on World Revolution: edited and with a critical introduction by W. Warren Wagar. Westport, Conn.: Praeger. ISBN 0-275-97539-8.
