= A History of the Future (TV series) =

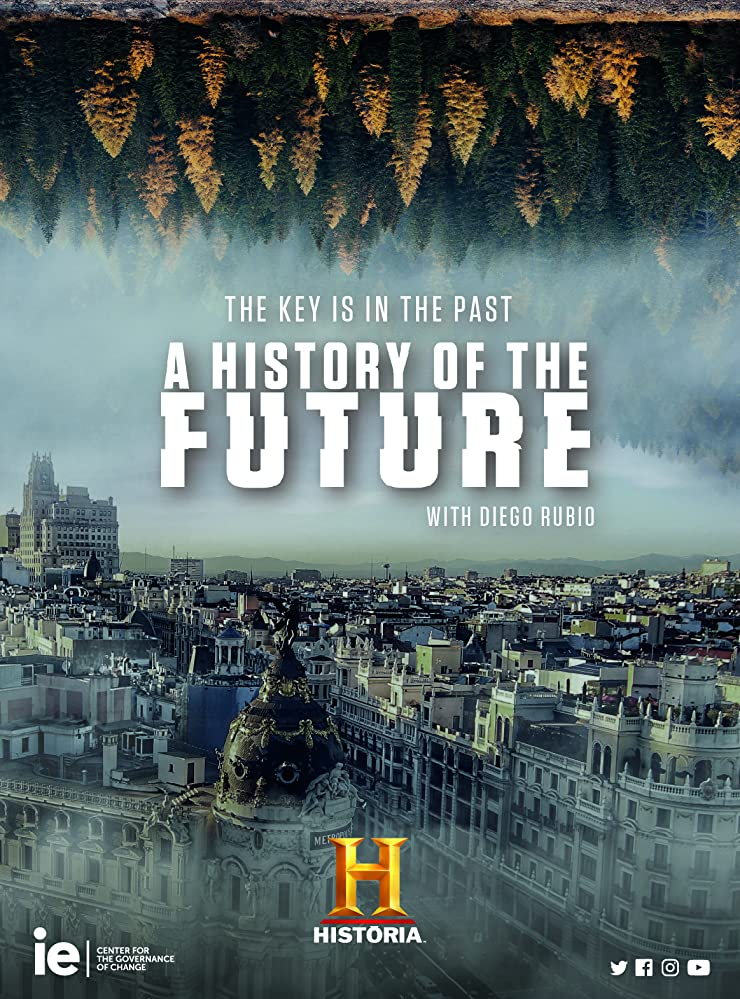
- Genre: Documentary Series
- Created by: Diego Rubio Rodríguez
- Directed by: Javier Boo; Ferran Estellés
- Narrated by: Diego Rubio Rodríguez
- Original languages: Spanish; English; Portuguese
- No. of episodes: 4

Production
- Executive producers: Carolina Goyadol; José María Irisarri; Gonzalo Sagardía
- Running time: 200 mins
- Production companies: History Channel; Onza Entertainment

Original release
- Network: History Channel
- Release: December 2020

A History of the Future is a 2019 documentary series by The History Channel, written and hosted by Professor Diego Rubio Rodríguez, and produced by Onza Entertainment. The series comprises four episodes, each of which explores one key aspect of society's future (work, democracy, globalization and climate) by analyzing past precedents and modern data, and projecting historical trends.

The series has been the most ambitious production of History Channel Iberia to date, and it was commissioned to commemorate the 20th anniversary of the channel entitled “History of the Future.” To create it, the team examined hundreds of hours of archival footage and modern 4K images filmed across the five continents.

The series features interviews with 18 leading academics, including Timothy Snyder (Yale), Erik Brynjolfsson (MIT), Naomi Oreskes (Harvard), Graham Allison (Harvard), Carl Benedikt Frey (Oxford), Steven Levitsky (Harvard), Rana Mitter (Oxford), César Hidalgo (MIT), Tim Leuning (LSE), Myles Allen (Oxford), Manuel Muñiz (IE), and Joanna Haigh(Imperial College).

The first episode premiered in Spanish and Portuguese on the History Channel on December 9, 2019, with great public success and media coverage. A preview was held on the 25th United Nations Climate Change conference. The English international version will be released in 2020.

== Episodes ==
Episode 1: The Future of Work

This first episode starts in the city of Istanbul. Rubio examines the story of the first Arabic printing press, banned by Ottoman emperors for four centuries to prevent the destruction of jobs. The episode then analyzes how the rulers of various other time periods tried to curb technological innovation throughout history, until the nineteenth century when the British government unleashed automation and sparked the First Industrial Revolution. Rubio examines the "Engels Pause" that subsequently occurred (precariousness and impoverishment of workers) and compares it to the situation of many developed countries today. He shows how technological change has affected people in the past, for better or worse, and speculates about how it will affect citizens in the next few decades. According to Rubio, in the digital age, “it is not the future of work, but the future of workers, that is at stake.”

Episode 2: The Future of Climate

This episode begins at the slopes of Mount Tambora (Indonesia), where a devastating 1815 eruption altered the planet's average temperature by 2 degrees, and caused several natural and social catastrophes throughout the northern hemisphere. Using this and other historical precedents, Rubio speculates about the catastrophic effects that a similar thermic alternation (anticipated by most scientists) could have in the coming decades. The episode travels to countries such as Algeria, Brazil, Egypt, Russia, Switzerland, the UK, and the US. It shows some of the history's worst droughts, floods, and pandemics, instances which, according to Rubio, demonstrate the fragility of societies in the face of climate change. The episode also examines, however, how the successful banning of CFCs to counter the hole in the ozone layer illustrates humanity's ability to face major systemic challenges.

Episode 3: The Future of Democracy

This episode documents the ongoing crisis of democracy and explores the strengths and weaknesses of some of the technological and autocratic alternatives that aspire to replace it. It starts in ancient Greece, and then travels to Corsica (birthplace of the first modern democracy), Germany, and China. Using Hitler's rise to power as an example, Rubio explains how many modern democracies are being dismantled from within by illiberal politicians who use the polls to seize power. He then examines the peculiarities of the Chinese autocratic system and the possibility that an Artificial Intelligence may end up ruling the West. The episode highlights the virtues of democracy, but also emphasizes the urgent need to modernize it.

Episode 4: The Future of Globalization

This episode explores the profound changes affecting the global order due to the rise of China and anti-globalization movements. Rubio begins his narration in the Chinese Imperial Palace of Chengde, and tells the story of the 1793 Macartney Embassy to illustrate Asia's power in the past. Then, he examines the evolution of the world's economic center of gravity over the past two millennia, to show that China's hegemony is not an anomaly but a return to normalcy. Through the historical perspective, Rubio analyzes the effects that the New Silk Road will have on globalization, the possibility of a war between the United States and China, and the unfolding migration crisis.

== Production ==
A History of the Future is an international production by the History Channel Iberia. It is the most ambitious show yet produced by the Channel and was commissioned in 2019 to commemorate its 20th anniversary. The series has three original versions: in Spanish (Spain), English (international), and Portuguese (subtitled).

The series was created, written, presented, and narrated by professor Diego Rubio. It was produced by Onza Entertainment, one of the most prestigious studios in Spain, creator of historical series such as The Ministry of Time (TVE and Netflix) or Hernán (Amazon Prime Video). It took more than a year of work and a 30-member team to complete. Researchers examined hundreds of hours of archival footage from the History Channel and used modern 4K images shot on the five continents.

- Original concept and script: Diego Rubio Rodríguez
- Production management: Javier Boo
- Av Production: Daniel San Román
- Direction: Ferran Estellés
- Narration: Diego Rubio Rodríguez
- Executive Production: Carolina Goyadol, José María Irisarri, Gonzalo Sagardía

== Featured Experts ==
The series features interviews with 18 leading academics, including historians, scientists, political scientists, and technology experts of eight different nationalities, currently working for institutions such as the OECD, and universities like Oxford, Harvard, MIT, IE, Yale, and the London School of Economics.

- Prof. Diego Rubio Rodríguez, Professor of Applied History and Governance at IE University, and executive director of the Center for the Governance of Change.
- Prof. Myles Allen, Director of the Climate Dynamics Group at the University of Oxford, and advisor to the UN's Intergovernmental Panel on Climate Change.
- Prof. Graham Allison, Professor of Government at Harvard University and co-chair of the Applied History Project.
- Prof. Erik Brynjolfsson, Director of the MIT Initiative on the Digital Economy and co-author of The Second Machine Age.
- Dr. Carl Benedikt Frey, Director of the Programme on Technology and Employment at the University of Oxford, and author of The Technology Trap.
- Prof. Gillen D'Arcy Wood, associate director of Education at the Institute for Sustainability, Energy, and Environment, at the University of Illinois and author of Tambora: The Eruption that Changed the World.
- Prof. Samuel K. Cohn, Professor of Medieval History at the University of Glasgow, and author of Epidemics: Hate and Compassion from the Plague of Athens to AIDS.
- Dr. Emmanuel Comte, Researcher at the Vienna School of International Studies, and author of The History of the European Migration Regime.
- Prof. David Frye, Professor of History at the Eastern Connecticut State University, and author of Walls: A History of Civilization.
- Prof. Joanna Haigh, Professor of Atmospheric Physics at Imperial College London, and Fellow of the Royal Society.
- Prof. César Hidalgo, Professor and Director of the Collective Learning group at MIT.
- Prof. William C. Kirby, Professor of China Studies at Harvard University and Chair of the Harvard China Fund.
- Prof. Tim Leunig, Professor of History at the London School of Economics.
- Gabriela Ramos, Chief of Staff & Sherpa to the G20, coordinator of Under Pressure: The Squeezed Middle Class.
- Prof. Steven Levitsky, Professor of Government at Harvard University, and co-author of How Democracies Die.
- Prof. Rana Mitter, Professor of History and Director of the China Center at the University of Oxford.
- Prof. Manuel Muñiz, Dean of IE School of Global and Public Affairs, and Professor of Global Transformation.
- Prof. Naomi Oreskes, Professor of History of Science at Harvard University, and co-author of The Collapse of Western Civilization.
- Prof. Timothy Snyder, Professor of History at Yale University, and author of The Road to Unfreedom.
- Dr. Carissa Véliz, Researcher at the Uehiro Centre for Practical Ethics at the University of Oxford, and editor of the Oxford Handbook of Digital Ethics.

== Applied History and Foresight ==
A History of the Future is the first documentary series that uses Applied History, a methodological approach that analyzes historical precedents and structural trends to illuminate current phenomena and anticipate future scenarios. The Applied History movement was born at the beginning of the 20th century in the United States, but it gained particular relevance in the recent years, thanks to initiatives such as the International Network of History & Policy, and Harvard's Applied History Project, directed by Niall Ferguson and Graham Allison. According to Professor Diego Rubio, author of the series: “History documentaries usually examine the past to shed light on the present. This series does something else: it combines historical trends with the latest scientific research to project future scenarios and help us better understand the challenges that humanity will face.”

== See also ==
- Explained
- The Vietnam War
- Wonders of the Universe
- Planet Earth II
- Cosmos: A Spacetime Odyssey
- The Untold History of the United States
- Inside Job
- The Great Hack
- An Inconvenient Sequel: Truth to Power
