= Zaida Cantera =

Spanish retired military officer and politician

Zaida Cantera MP
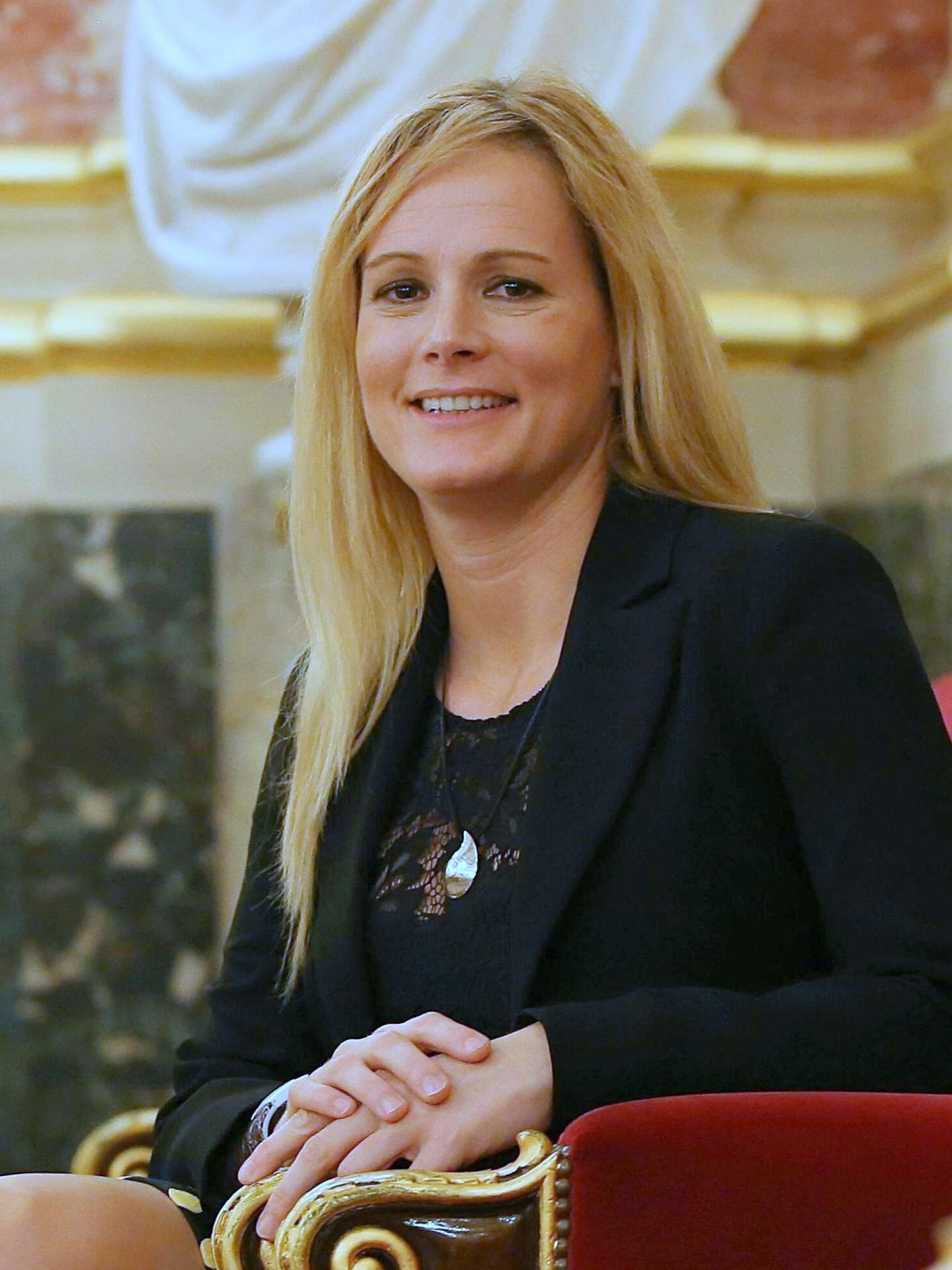
- 2016

Member of the Congress of Deputies
- Incumbent
- Assumed office 5 January 2016
- Constituency: Madrid

Personal details
- Born: Zaida Cantera de Castro; 6 June 1977 (age 49) Madrid, Spain
- Party: PSOE
- Education: General Military Academy
- Occupation: Politician, military officer

Military service
- Allegiance: Spain
- Branch/service: Army
- Years of service: 2003–2015
- Rank: Major
- Unit: Engineers and Signals Corps
- Awards: Cross of Military Merit; UN Medal (UNMIK); UN Medal (UNIFIL)

Zaida Cantera de Castro (born 6 June 1977) is a Spanish retired military officer and politician currently affiliated with the Spanish Socialist Workers' Party (PSOE). She was a deputy for Madrid in the 11th and 12th Legislatures.

== Military career ==
Zaida Cantera entered the General Military Academy in 1997, receiving her specialization in Signals at the Engineers and Signals School, where she graduated in 2003, receiving her commission as lieutenant. She also holds master's degrees in Networks and Information Systems and Communication and Information Systems for Security and Defense.

She was assigned to the Signals Unit of the Armored Brigade and participated in international missions such as the conflicts in Kosovo and Lebanon, reaching the rank of major in the Army. After returning from the latter country she began to suffer sexual harassment from a superior, a fact that she denounced before the Central Military Court. In 2014, she requested her departure from the Armed Forces and was definitively discharged in 2015. Cantera recounted these episodes of harassment in the book No, mi general, in co-authorship with UPyD deputy Irene Lozano.

== Political career ==
On 20 December 2015, Cantera was elected a member of the Congress of Deputies as part of the PSOE list for Madrid. In the investiture vote of Mariano Rajoy, she was one of the 15 socialist MPs that did not abstain from voting against PSOE advice, and she joined the PSOE on 5 January 2017 in order to vote in the primaries of the 39th federal congress in favor of Pedro Sánchez.
