= Government of Spain =

- Spanish: Gobierno de España Co-official languages Basque: Espainiako Gobernua; Catalan: Govern d'Espanya; Galician: Goberno de España; Aranese: Govèrn d'Espanha
- Logo of the Government of Spain
- Role: Executive power
- Established: 15 January 1834; 192 years ago
- Country: Kingdom of Spain
- Appointed by: Monarch
- Main organ: Council of Ministers
- Responsible to: Cortes Generales
- Constitution instrument: Government Act of 1997

Cabinet
- Members: Sánchez Government
- Prime Minister: Pedro Sánchez
- Deputy Prime Minister: Carlos Cuerpo
- Number of members: 22

Administration
- Working language: Spanish
- Staff organization: Ministries
- Location: Madrid, Spain
- Seat: Moncloa Palace (since 1977)
- Website: Official website

The government of Spain (Spanish: Gobierno de España) is the central government which leads the executive branch and the General State Administration of the Kingdom of Spain.

The Government consists of the Prime Minister and the Ministers; the prime minister has the overall direction of the Ministers and can appoint or terminate their appointments freely. The ministers also belong to the supreme decision-making body, known as the Council of Ministers. The Government is responsible before the Parliament (Cortes Generales), and more precisely before the Congress of the Deputies, a body which elects the Prime Minister or dismisses them through a motion of censure. This is because Spain is a parliamentary system established by the Constitution of 1978.

Its fundamental regulation is placed in Title IV of the Constitution, as well as in Title V of that document, with respect to its relationship with the Cortes Generales, and in Law 50/1997, of 27 November, of the Government. According to Article 97 of the Constitution and Article 1.1 of the Government Act, "the Government directs domestic and foreign policy, the civil and military administration and the defense of the State. It exercises the executive function and the regulatory regulation according to the Constitution and the laws".

Pedro Sánchez, took office as prime minister on 2 June 2018. He is the leader of the Socialist Workers' Party. He picked his third cabinet in late 2023.

The government is occasionally referred to by the metonymy Moncloa because the Palace of Moncloa is the headquarters of the government, as well as the residence of the prime minister.

== Principles ==
The Government's performance is governed by the following operating principles:

- Principle of presidential direction: The Prime Minister directs the Ministers and can appoint or dismiss them freely.
- Principle of responsibility: The Prime Minister responds politically to the Congress of Deputies for the action of the Government. The eventual cessation of the Prime Minister implies the cessation of the Government.
- Principle of collegiality: The Government, understood as Council of Ministers, is a collegiate body composed of a plurality of members of the Government.
- Principle of solidarity: The Government responds in solidum for the action of each one of the members of the Government.
- Departmental principle: The members of the Government, as well as members of this collegiate body, are also the heads of a department in charge of a more or less homogeneous area of competence.

== Government in Parliament ==
Control sessions in the
Cortes Generales

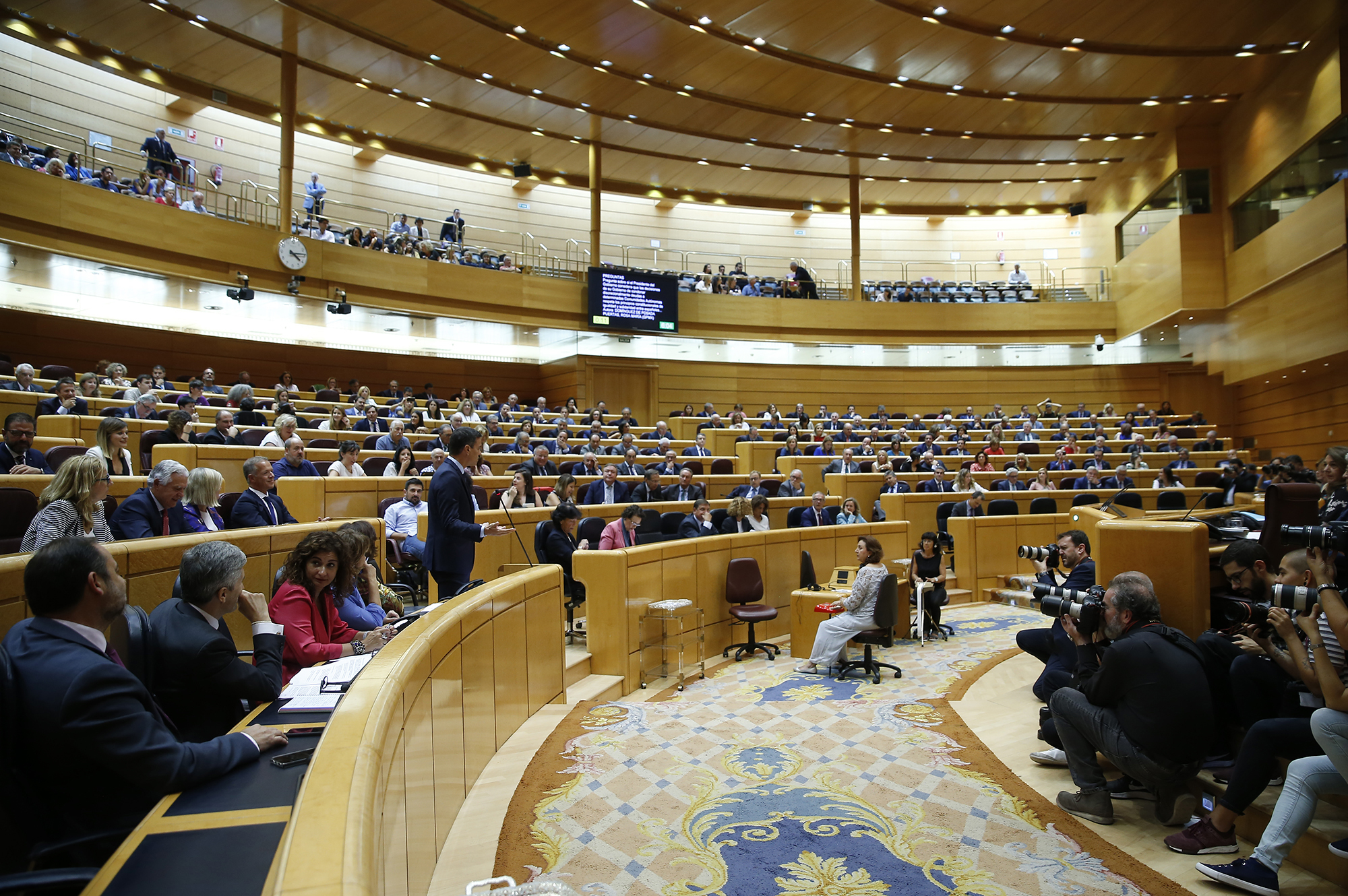
Senate

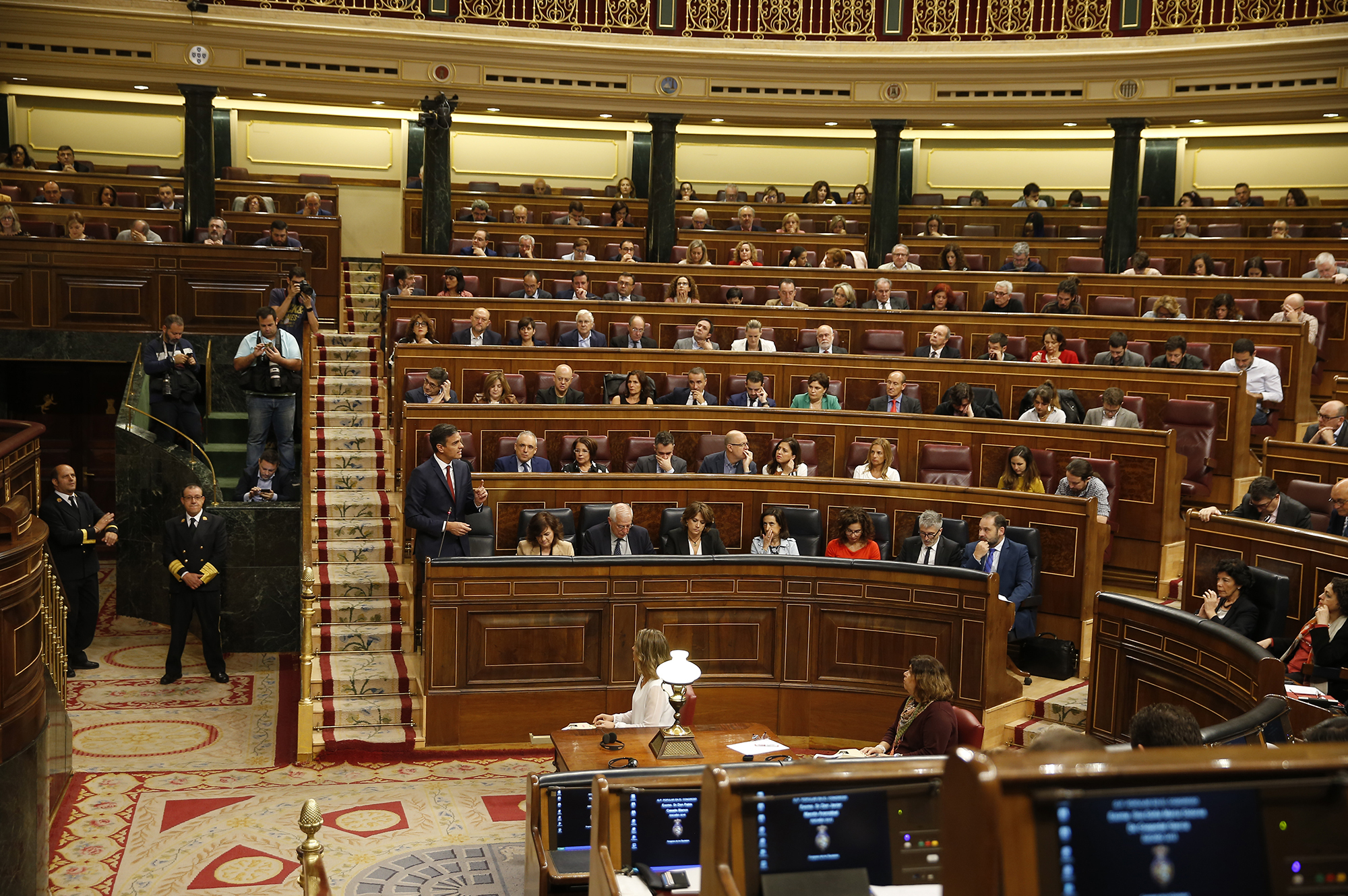
Congress of Deputies

The Kingdom of Spain is a constitutional monarchy in which executive decisions are made by the Government. More specifically, the Spanish Constitution describes Spain's form of government as monarquía parlamentaria, or parliamentary monarchy, in which the monarch acts as a moderator rather than a source of executory authority. Spain possesses an asymmetric bicameral parliament, called the Cortes Generales, composed of the Congress of Deputies and the Senate. While both the Congress and Senate propose legislation, albeit by different procedural mechanisms, the government has the right to be consulted for such proposals. The government may also propose law directly. A government-sponsored bill is known as a proyecto de ley, contrasting with a proposición de ley which is offered by a house of parliament.

Neither the prime minister nor the ministers are required to be members of parliament, but the government must account to both the Senate and Congress every week in a parliamentary meeting known as a sesión de control (control session) (Part V § 108). Questioning minor-rank ministers, such as Secretaries of State or Under-secretaries, must be done in Parliamentary Committees. While the prime minister is usually elected from the members of Congress, prime minister Pedro Sánchez was not a member of either chamber for the first year of his premiership.

Under the parliamentary system, the Government is required to maintain the confidence of the Congress of Deputies. In the absence of such confidence, the Government may fall or prove unable to pass legislation. There are two procedures to ascertain the Congress's confidence in the Government: the motion of no-confidence (Part V § 113), by which members of parliament can ask the Congress to rescind its confidence in the prime minister and to elect another, and the question of confidence (Part V § 112), by which the prime minister asks the Congress if it supports the Government's political programs generally or a specific piece of legislation. A loss by the Government in either case may result in the removal of the prime minister.

== The Government and the Crown ==
Royal prerogative of assent and enact laws

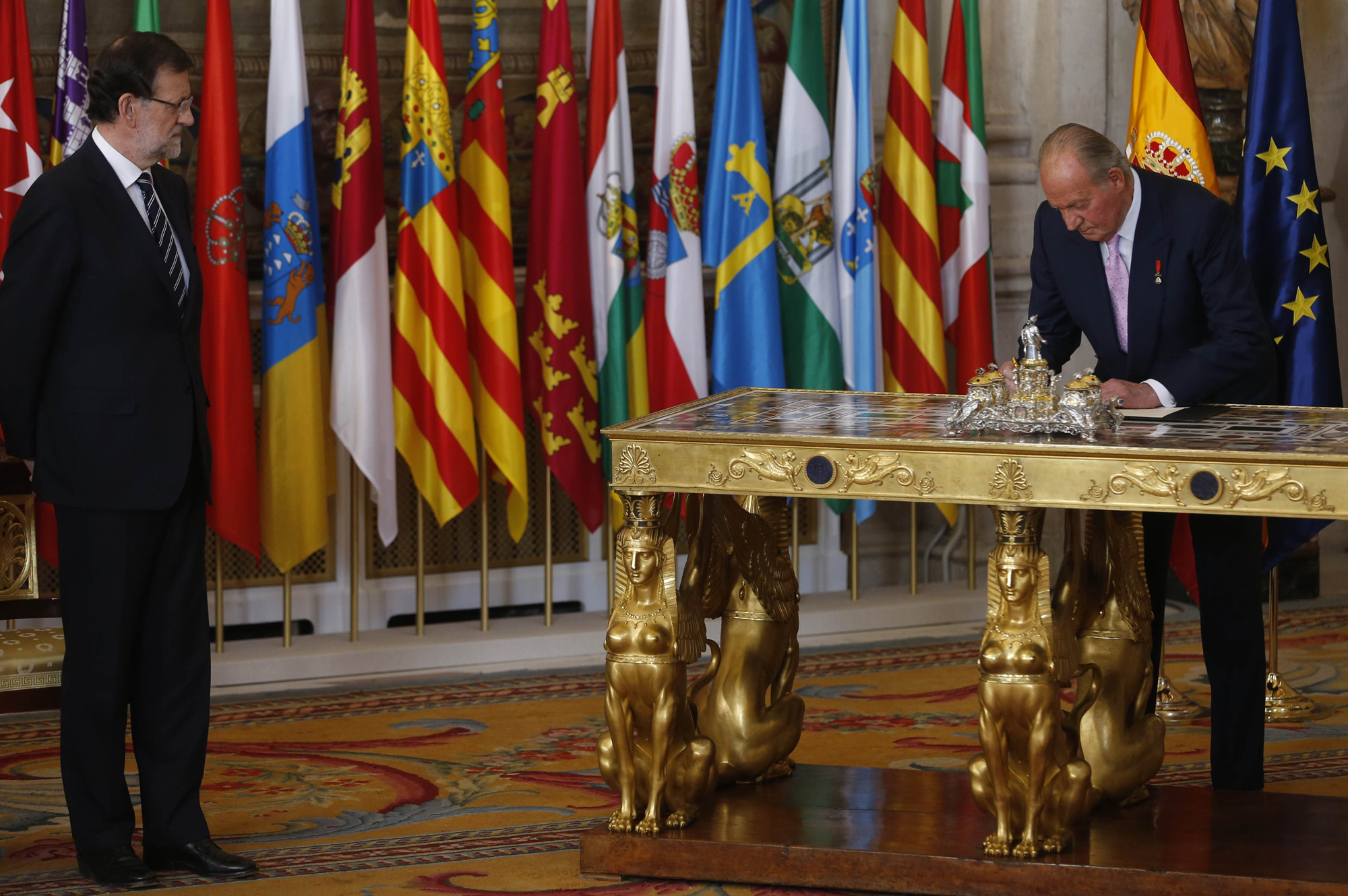
King Juan Carlos I assenting to and enacting a law...

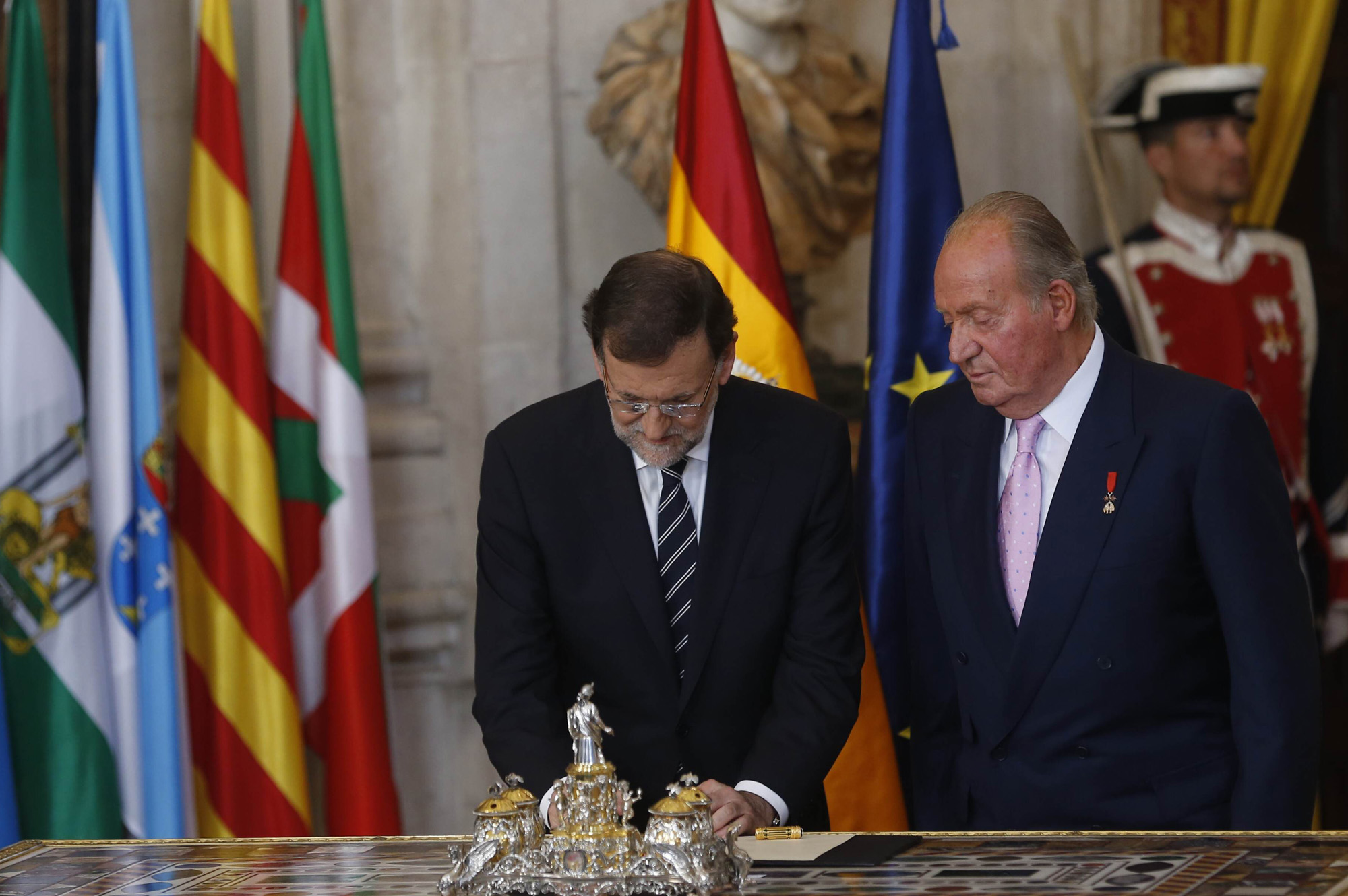
... and PM Rajoy countersigning the law.

The Spanish monarch, King Felipe VI as of 2025, is the head of state and the commander-in-chief of the armed forces. As a monarch of a parliamentary monarchy, the executive power does not belong to The Crown and is independent from it. The Constitution gives the monarch a symbolic role, but also a moderating role, being able to intervene if there is a conflict between the country's institutions (Part II § 56).

As commander-in-chief of the armed forces, former King Juan Carlos I suppressed the 23-F Spanish coup d'état attempt in February 1981, showing that the monarch has more power than the constitution grants him. The heir presumptive is Leonor, Princess of Asturias.

The Constitution also gives the monarch some powers known as Royal Prerogatives. These prerogatives range from the signing of international treaties, to declaring war and making peace or to dissolving the parliament. However, with the arrival of democracy, these prerogatives have been regulated and most of them must be countersigned by an official.

Although the monarch is not part of the executive power, the prime minister has weekly meetings with him to inform him about the Government's activity, and the King can express his opinion. Similarly, the monarch is normally invited to the first Council of Ministers of every new government, and others at the prime minister's discretion, and to the meetings of bodies such as the National Security Council and the National Defence Council.

The Royal prerogatives are:

Domestic powers

- The power to propose, appoint and dismiss the prime minister. This power is exercised by the monarch himself. By convention he proposes the individual who has most support in Congress; his powers of appointment and dismissal are exercised subject to the Constitution.
- The power to dismiss and appoint other ministers. This power is exercised by the monarch on the advice of the prime minister.
- The power to assent to and enact laws by giving Royal Assent to Bills passed by Parliament, which is required in order for a bill to become law. This prerogative is exercised by the monarch but needs the countersignature of the prime minister. The constitution does not allow a monarch to refuse to sign a law passed by Parliament.
- The power to assent to and enact norms with a lower rank than law. This prerogative is exercised by the monarch but needs the countersignature of the prime minister, a minister, the president of the Congress, or the Senate (depending on the kind of norm).
- The power to call a referendum. This is exercised with the countersignature of the prime minister after being requested by the Council of Ministers.
- Command of the Armed Forces of Spain. This prerogative is delegated to the prime minister and the minister of Defence.
- The power to give royal pardons, in Spain known as right of grace (derecho de gracia). The decision of whom to pardon is delegated to the Minister of Justice and the Council of Ministers.
- The power to be informed of affairs of State and chair the sessions of the Council of Ministers. It is exercised after being requested by the prime minister.
- The power to grant civil and military jobs. This prerogative requires a Government countersignature.
- The power to appoint civil or military members of his private household.
- The power to use freely the budget of his household.
- The power to grant, cancel, and annul honours.
- The power of high patronage of the Royal Academies.
- The power to grant sports teams, federations, and other sports organizations the title of Real (Royal).

Foreign powers

- The power to ratify and make treaties.
- The power to declare war and make peace with other nations.
- The power to accredit and receive diplomats.

== Members ==
To see the current members, see Council of Ministers.

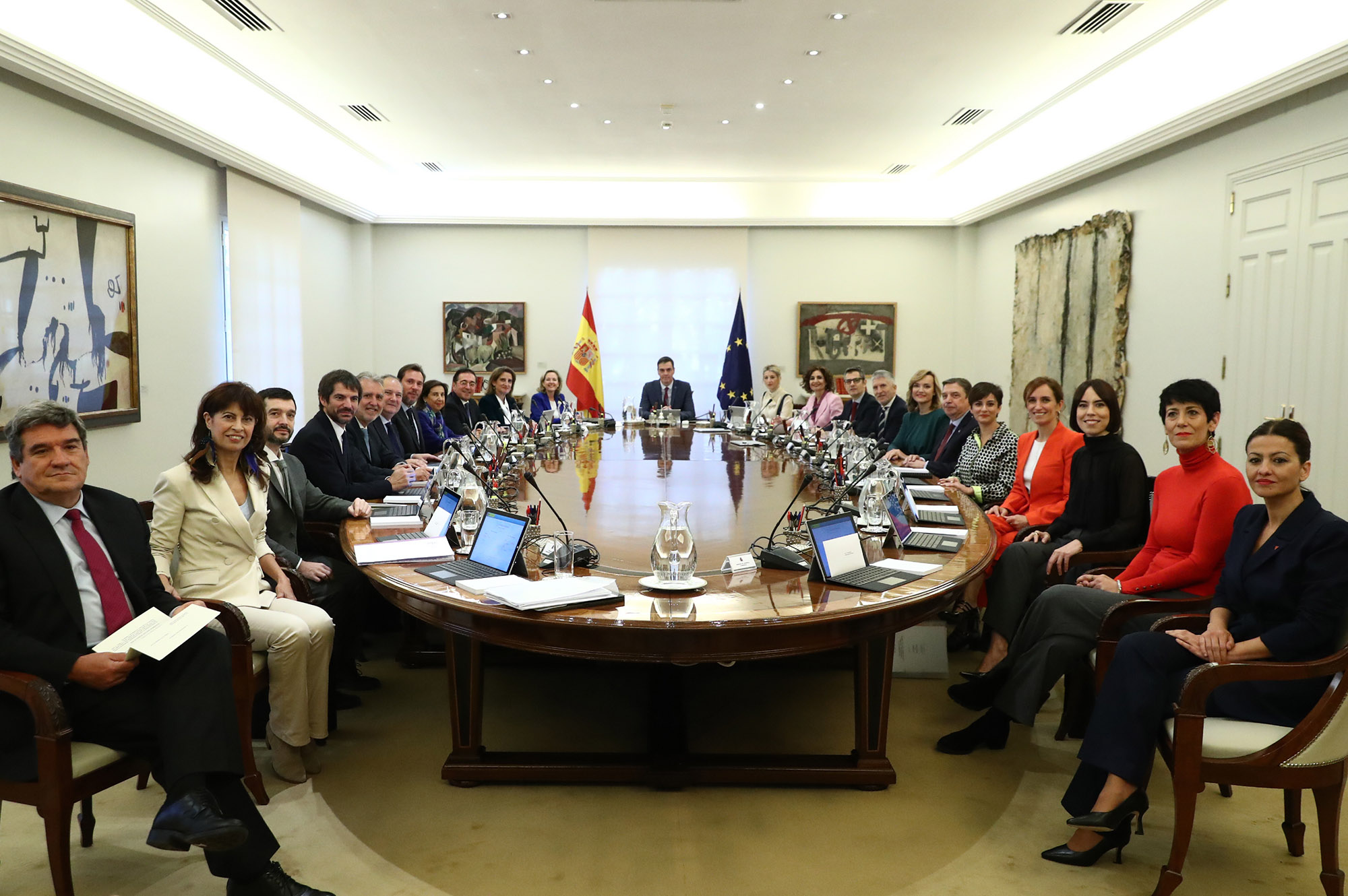
The Council of Ministers in 2023.

According to Article 98 of the Spanish Constitution and Article 1.2 of the Government Law, the Government of Spain is composed of:

- The Prime Minister.
- The Deputy Prime Minister or Deputy Prime Ministers (If there are more than one).
- The Ministers.
- Other members. There is the possibility of incorporating other figures into Government by law (such as Secretaries of State). However, this constitutional possibility has not yet been used.

=== Requirements ===
In accordance with article 11 of the Law of the Government, "to be a member of the Government it is required to be Spanish, adult, to enjoy the rights of active and passive suffrage, as well as not to be disabled to exercise employment or public office by sentence Judicial firm."

=== Criminal privileges ===
Members of the Government enjoy their own criminal procedure, and can only be tried by the Criminal Chamber of the Supreme Court.

The initiation of a case for treason or against the security of the State can only respond to the initiative of a quarter of the Congress of Deputies, must be approved by an absolute majority thereof, and a pardon can not be granted in such cases.

== Caretaker government ==
Section 101 of the Spanish Constitution says that "the Government shall resign after the holding of general elections, in the event of loss of parliamentary confidence as provided in the Constitution, or on the resignation or death of the President. The outgoing Government shall continue as acting body until the new Government takes office".

Between the approval of the Constitution in 1978 and the approval of the Government Act of 1997, there were no explicit limitations to the powers of an acting government except for what doctrine and parliamentary practice said. With this constitutional precept it was intended that the succession of one Government by another does not affect the fundamental continuity of the governmental action or that paralysis or dysfunctions occur in the system as a whole. This need of not leaving a modern state without its central governing body is explained very well in a Supreme Court declaration that "It is easy to understand that Spain can not run out of government even for a few hours".

In 1997 the Government Act was passed, regulating a caretaker government in Title 4. In addition to the aforementioned constitutional provisions, Section 21 of the Government Act establishes that "the caretaker government shall facilitate the normal development of the process of formation of the new Government and the transfer of powers to it and limit its duties to the ordinary office of public affairs, abstaining from adopting, except in cases of urgency duly accredited or for reasons of general interest whose accreditation expressly justifies it, any other measures".

This article also establishes explicit limitations on the prime minister, preventing them from "proposing to the King the dissolution of any of the Chambers or the Cortes Generales, raising the question of confidence, or proposing to the King the calling for a consultative referendum" and on the Government prohibiting it from "the approval of the State General Budget Bill or presenting bills to the Cortes Generales". The government may not exercise the legislative delegations that the parliament has granted to it while acting as a caretaker government.

On the occasion of the 2015–2016 caretaker government of Mariano Rajoy, the Government refused repeatedly to submit to the control of the Congress of Deputies alleging that there was no trust relationship between both powers as it was a caretaker government and, therefore, the legislative power could not control the executive. Faced with this situation, the Congress denounced the Executive Power before the Constitutional Court for refusing to submit to its control and, on 22 November 2018, the high court ruled that the Government "undermined the constitutional attribution" that the Constitution confers on Congress and that although "control of the Government's action will normally be exercised within the framework of the confidence that must exist between the Government and the Congress of Deputies", this does not mean that "exceptionally, as are the periods in which there is no relationship of trust between Congress and the Government, the aforementioned control function can not be exercised" since "the control function that corresponds to the Cortes Generales is implicit in its representative character and in the form of parliamentary government that establishes Article 1.3 of the Constitution, not being able to deny the Chambers all exercise of the control function, since this would affect to the balance of powers foreseen in our Constitution".

As of 2025 the longest caretaker government in Spanish politics since the restoration of democracy in 1977 was the 2015–2016 Rajoy government, with a record of 316 days.

== Location ==
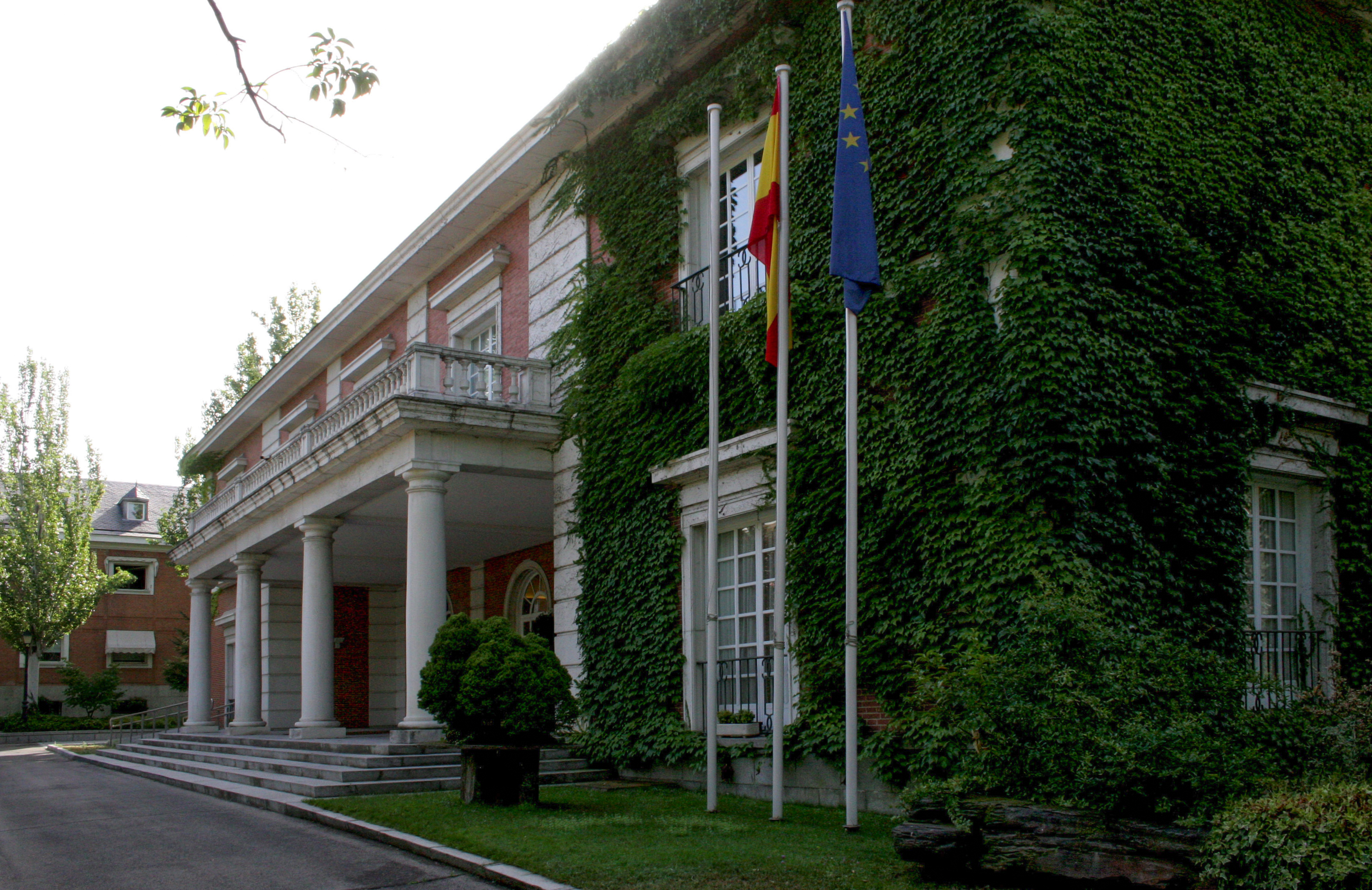
The Palace of Moncloa or Moncloa Palace is the official residence and workplace of the Prime Minister of Spain.

The Office of the Prime Minister as well as the official headquarters of the Government are located in the Palace of Moncloa, outside Madrid. The Council of Ministers meetings also take place here. In this palace is also the office of the deputy prime minister, the headquarters of the Ministry of the Presidency and the office of the government spokesperson. Most government departments are located in the centre of the city of Madrid, each with its own buildings. Many ministries are located in the gubernatorial complex of New Ministries.

== Advisory bodies ==
The Spanish Government has two main advisory bodies:

- The Council of State, which advise the Government in legal matters and all the issues that does not correspond to the other advisory body.
- The Economic and Social Council, responsible for advising the Government in socioeconomic and labour matters.

== Budget ==
The General State Budget is considered one of the most important legislations that a Government can pass. According to the Constitution, the Government is the only body that can propose the Budget bill; the parliament may accept it, reject it or propose modifications. If the Congress approves a full budget amendment, the budget is automatically rejected.

== Devolved governments ==
Since the approval of the Constitution of 1978, Spain was established as a decentralized unitary state which grants its regions a high degree of autonomy. The first two regions to be granted autonomy were the Basque Country and Catalonia in 1979. In 1981, four further regions achieved their autonomy: Andalusia, Asturias, Cantabria and Galicia. A year later, seven more regions were granted autonomy: Aragon, the Canary Islands, Castile-La Mancha, Navarre, Murcia and La Rioja. The last four regions to become autonomous were the Balearic Islands, Castile and León, Extremadura and Madrid, all of them in 1983.

The Constitution also granted the cities of Ceuta and Melilla autonomy, which was implemented in 1995. The Constitution also gives them the possibility to become fully autonomous communities, but as of 2025 these cities have not requested this.

== Commissioners ==
Although it is not a very common position within the Administration, the position of Commissioner or High Commissioner, a senior official normally holding the position of Secretary of State or Under Secretary and entrusted with a specific task, has existed.

As of 2025 there are two high commissioners, three special commissioners and two commissioners, all of them with the rank of Under-Secretary:

- The High Commissioner for the fight against child poverty, created in 2018 to end with the child poverty and inequality in childhood in Spain and to oversight the comply of the Convention on the Rights of the Child and other international agreements on this matter by the different administrations. It has the rank of Under Secretary and it depends from the Prime Minister.
- The High Commissioner for Spain Entrepreneurial Nation, created in 2020 to coordinate all the actions relating the economic and technological entrepreneurship. It has the rank of Under Secretary and it depends from the Prime Minister.
- The Special Commissioner for the Alliance for the New Economy of Language, created in 2022 to promote and coordinate all projects related to the private-public project which aims to use Spanish and other Spanish languages in the field of artificial intelligence. It has the rank of Under Secretary and it depends from the minister of Economy.
- The Special Commissioner for Transport, Mobility and Urban Agenda, created in 2022 to promote and coordinate all transport, mobility and urban agenda private-public projects. It has the rank of Under Secretary and it depends from the minister of Transport.
- The Special Commissioner for the Reconstruction of the island of La Palma, created in 2022 to coordinate and promote the actions adopted by the General State Administration to repair the damage caused by volcanic eruptions and for the reconstruction of the island of La Palma. It has the rank of Under Secretary and it depends from the minister of the Presidency, although functionally from the minister of Transport.
- The Commissioner for Aerospace 'PERTE', created in 2022 to promote and coordinate all projects related to the private-public project which aims to reform the Spanish aerospace industry and to assist the Ministry of Science in the necessary actions to create the Spanish Space Agency.
- The Commissioner for the Promotion of Sustainable Energy in the Islands, created in 2022 to coordinate and promote public policies for sustainable energy in the Balearic and Canary archipelagos. It depends from the Secretary of State for Energy of the Ministry of Ecological Transition.

=== Former commissioners ===
- Because of the Prestige oil spill in late 2002, the Government created in 2003 the Commissioner for actions arising from the catastrophe of the ship "Prestige" to collaborate in the actions to repair the damages originated by it. It was suppressed in 2004. It had the rank of Secretary of State and it depended from the Deputy Prime Minister.
  For this purpose between 2003 and 2004 also existed two Commissioners one depending from the Development Minister and other from the Environment Minister.
- In 2003 it was created the Commissioner of the Government for the participation of Spain in the reconstruction of Iraq and the position was assumed by the Secretary of State of Defence.
- After the 2004 Madrid train bombings, the government created the High Commissioner for the Support of Victims of Terrorism. It had rank of Secretary of State and it depended from the Prime Minister.
- In 2005 it was created the Commissioner of the Government for the celebration of the 32nd America's Cup to coordinate the organization of the 2007 America's Cup after which the Commissioner ceased in its functions. It had rank of Under Secretary and it depended from the Public Administration Minister.
- Between 2011 and 2013 existed the position of Commissioner of the Government for actions derived from the Lorca earthquake, renamed in 2012 Commissioner of the Government for the Reconstruction and Economic Reactivation of the Lorca Zone, to coordinate, monitoring and, where appropriate, the proposal to the Government of the measures to repair and rebuild the affected area by the 2011 Lorca earthquake in collaboration with the Region of Murcia and the City Council of Lorca. It had rank of Secretary of State and it depended from the Ministers of the Presidency and Development.
- Between 2012 and 2018 existed the position of High Commissioner of the Government for the Spain Brand to improve the foreign image and to promote Spain. It had the rank of Secretary of State and it depended from the Foreign Minister. In 2018, its competences where assumed by the Secretary of State for Global Spain.
- The Commissioner of the Government for the Demographic Challenge, created in 2017 to develop a nation-wide common strategy to face the progressive population ageing, territorial depopulation and the effects of the floating population. It had the rank of Under Secretary and it was part of the Territorial Policy Ministry. It was abolished in 2020 and its competences were assumed by the newly General Secretariat for the Demographic Challenge.
- The High Commissioner for the 2030 Agenda, created in 2018 to coordinate all the actions taken by the Public Administrations to accomplish with the Sustainable Development Goals. It had the rank of Under Secretary and it was part of the Prime Minister's Office. Abolished in 2020, its competences were assumed by the Secretariat of State for the 2030 Agenda.

== Logo ==

Shown here is the official logo of the Government of Spain. On the left are the EU and the Spanish flags and in the centre is the coat of arms of Spain and the words Gobierno de España (in English: "Government of Spain"). The ministries’ logos consist of additional yellow rectangles added to the right of the Government's logo, which read the name of the ministry in the same typographic style (Gill Sans).

== See also ==
- Spanish government departments
- List of prime ministers of Spain
- Politics of Spain
- List of Spanish regional governments
- Local government in Spain
