= Secretary of State for Global Spain =

- Secretario de Estado de la España Global
- Coat of Arms used by the Government

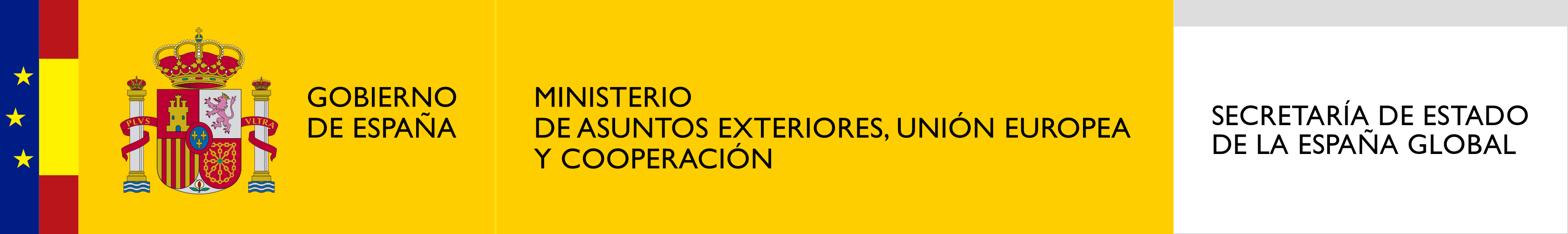
- Incumbent; Office abolished
- Ministry of Foreign Affairs, European Union and Cooperation; Secretariat of State for Global Spain
- Style: The Most Excellent (formal); Mr./Ms. Secretary of State (informal)
- Abbreviation: SEEG
- Reports to: Foreign Minister
- Nominator: Foreign Minister
- Appointer: The King
- Precursor: High Commissioner of the Government for Brand Spain
- Formation: October 9, 2018
- First holder: Irene Lozano
- Final holder: Manuel Muñiz
- Abolished: July 17, 2021
- Website: http://www.thisistherealspain.com

The Secretary of State for Global Spain (SEEG) was a senior minister of the Ministry of Foreign Affairs, European Union and Cooperation of the Kingdom of Spain. It was directly responsible of the strategic design of Spain's foreign policy and external action. This involved, among other things, defining the key strategic lines of action, boosting and coordinating Spain's economic and public diplomacy, defending and promoting the image and international reputation of the country, and being in charge of the Ministry's communications. All of this occurred with the support of the rest of the Ministry's bodies and institutions that were linked to it such as the network of Casas, the Fundaciones Consejo or other analogous entities.

It was created in 2018 after assuming the competences and office of the High Commissioner of the Government for Brand Spain and was strengthened in 2020 with the addition of duties in the realms of strategy, communications and economic diplomacy. The office was abolished in July 2021.

== History ==
The origin of the Secretariat of State for Global Spain dates back to 2012, when the government of Mariano Rajoy, launched the position of High Commissioner of the Government for Brand Spain, a position entrusted with the objective of coordinating the multiple private and public bodies that had a foreign action in order to give coherence to the image of Spain outside its borders. Created during the economic crisis, it had its own office known as Office of the High Commissioner but had no budget.

With the change of government in 2018, and following numerous criticisms of its lack of regulation, control and budget, the Foreign Minister Josep Borrell reformed the office orienting it to «present Spain as it is, a full democracy», in a clear allusion to the deterioration of Spain's image arising from the Catalan separatist challenge, and bestowing it with its own budget. In October of that year, it was granted the level of Secretariat of State (Deputy Ministry) and was fully integrated in the Ministry of Foreign Affairs, European Union and Cooperation.

After Irene Lozano’s departure and the arrival of Manuel Muñiz Villa as Secretary of State and Arancha González Laya as Minister, the Secretariat of State was restructured to extend its competences with the transferral of the Directorate-General for International Economic Relations, then renamed Directorate-General for Economic Diplomacy, the Directorate-General for Communications, Public Diplomacy and Media, as well as the creation of the Directorate-General for Strategy, Foresight and Coherence.

After the appointment of a new minister, the last officeholder, Manuel Muñiz, resigned as Secretary of State. Days later, new foreign minister José Manuel Albares abolished the position.

== Structure ==
The Secretariat of State was composed of three departments, all of them ran by a Director-General:

- The Directorate-General for Strategy, Forecast and Coherence: A department created in 2020 responsible for carrying out analysis and studies of the current situation and establishing a coherent strategy for Spain's foreign policy, and ensuring its adequate implementation. It also conducted foresight studies aimed at providing Spain with the capacity to adjust to the changing international landscape. This department contained the Policy Planning Staff of the Ministry. It was also responsible for preserving the international reputation of Spain.
- The Directorate-General for Economic Diplomacy: A department of the Secretariat of State responsible for the proposal and execution of Spain's foreign policy in a wide range of fields. These included international economic relations of a bilateral and multilateral nature, the institutional representation of Spain in organizations such as the OECD, the proposal and execution of Spanish foreign policy in air, maritime, terrestrial cooperation, and space, oceanic and polar matters, and the negotiation and internal processing of international, bilateral and multilateral agreements.
- The Directorate-General for Communication, Public Diplomacy and Media: Traditionally known as the Diplomatic Information Office (OID), it was the department responsible for gathering and disseminating information to the Ministry and the media. It also carried out advertising campaigns and coordinates the Ministry's media platforms.

== Duties ==
As well as the duties previously outlined, the Secretariat of State was specifically in charge of:

- The formulation and elaboration of the strategic lines of action that ought to guide the foreign action of the organs of public administrations and their dependent bodies, within the framework given by the 2014 Law of the Action and Exterior Service of the State. Additionally, it is in charge of the impetus, coordination and development of the corresponding strategic documents and action plans.
- The formulation and execution of Spain's foreign policy with regard to economic diplomacy.
- The formulation and execution of Spain's foreign policy with regard to public diplomacy, as well as the coordination of all the public administrations, bodies and concerned entities in this remit, within the framework of the provisions in the 2014 Law of the Action and Exterior Service of the State. It is also in charge of facilitating the participation of private entities with international projection in said policy of public diplomacy through the corresponding instruments of public-private cooperation.
- The formulation and execution of Spain's foreign policy with regard to the defence and the promotion of the image and international reputation of the country, as well as the coordination of all the public administrations, bodies and concerned entities in this remit.
- The formulation and execution of the Ministry's communications policy.

== List of state secretaries ==
No.	Image	Name	Term of office			Ministers serving under	Prime Minister
No.	Image	Name	Began	Ended	Days of service	Ministers serving under	Prime Minister
1º		Irene Lozano	13 October 2018	29 January 2020	474	Josep Borrell	Pedro Sánchez
2º		Manuel Muñiz	30 January 2020	14 July 2021	531	Arancha González Laya	Pedro Sánchez
