= Irene Lozano =

Spanish writer and journalist

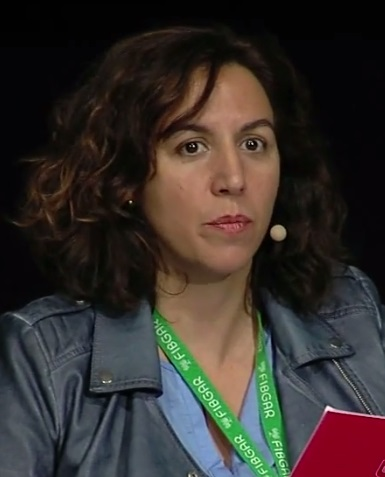
- 2014

President of the National Sports Council
- In office 30 January 2020 – 31 March 2021
- Preceded by: María José Rienda
- Succeeded by: José Manuel Franco

Secretary of State for Global Spain
- In office 13 October 2018 – 29 January 2020
- Preceded by: Carlos Espinosa de los Monteros (as High Commissioner of the Government for Brand Spain)
- Succeeded by: Manuel Muñiz Villa

Member of the Congress of Deputies
- In office 13 January 2016 – 3 May 2016
- Constituency: Madrid

Member of the Congress of Deputies
- In office 13 December 2011 – 16 October 2015
- Constituency: Madrid

Personal details
- Born: Irene Lozano Domingo; 17 June 1971 (age 55) Madrid, Spain
- Party: UPyD (2011–2015); PSOE (2015–2016, independent)
- Education: Complutense University of Madrid; Birkbeck College
- Occupation: Journalist, writer, politician
- Awards: Espasa Essay Award (2005)

Irene Lozano Domingo (born 17 June 1971) is a Spanish writer, journalist, and politician, who served as President of the Consejo Superior de Deportes and Secretary of State for Sports of Spain from 2020 to 2021 and as Secretary of State for Global Spain from 2018 to 2020 under Pedro Sánchez.

She was an MP for Union, Progress and Democracy (UPyD) in the 10th Cortes Generales of the Congress of Deputies from 13 December 2011 to 16 October 2015, when she was officially discharged.

In July 2015 she lost the primary elections to lead UPyD. On 16 October, it was announced that she would occupy the 4th position as an independent in the Spanish Socialist Workers' Party (PSOE) list for the district of Madrid in the legislative elections convened for 20 December, and that she joined the team of experts to develop the party's election program.

== Early life and education ==
Lozano holds a licentiate in Linguistics from the Complutense University of Madrid and a diploma in Philosophy from Birkbeck College of the University of London. Her last published essay is Lecciones para el inconformista aturdido en tres horas y cuarto (Debate, 2009).

== Career ==
In 1993, she received the prize of the Círculo de Lectores' 4th Literary Contest for her story "Rimara", and then began her essay work with the publication of the book Lenguaje femenino, lenguaje masculino (Minerva, 1995).

From 1995 to 2005 she was editor of the newspaper El Mundo. After writing editorials for years in the Opinion section, she moved on to International, where she was sent to Mauritania, Algeria, Kosovo, and to cover elections in Nicaragua and Sweden. She also worked in the closing section, and wrote opinion articles and literary criticism in "The Sphere of Books". She has written for Spanish magazines such as Cuadernos de Periodistas, Ínsula, Leer, and GEO, and for foreign media, such as the BBC program Europe and the Swedish newspaper Expressen.

In 2005 she published the biography Federica Montseny, una anarquista en el poder (Espasa) and won the Espasa Essay Award for Lenguas en guerra.

Lozano was an ABC columnist from 2005 to 2010. She is currently a columnist for El País, where she publishes monthly, and contributes to the regional press of the Vocento Group (El Comercio, El Correo, El Norte de Castilla, La Verdad, etc.) through a biweekly column, as well as to the thought magazines Claves and Revista de Occidente, and the online publications Fronteras and Cuarto poder. On Thursdays she participates in the Punto Radio talk show Protagonistas. She teaches literary journalism at the Hotel Kafka writers' school, and a class on column writing in ABC's master's program.

She has participated in the discussion and tertulia shows Enfoque and Los Desayunos, both on Televisión Española, as well as El debate (CNN+), and Las mañanas de Cuatro and Espejo público (Antena 3).

She has collaborated on collective works such as the Academia de la Historia's Diccionario biográfico español and the Autonomous University of Barcelona's Diccionario biobibliográfico del exilio literario de 1939. She contributed the prologue and several notes to the compilation book Es lo que hay de Rosa Díez (Debate, 2011).

From the general elections of 20 November 2011 until 16 October 2015, she served as a member of the Congress of Deputies for UPyD. During this period she was the party's spokesman in the Foreign Affairs, International Cooperation for Development, and Defense committees, as well as in the Joint Commissions for the European Union and for the parliamentary control of the RTVE Corporation and its partners. In addition she was assigned to the commissions of Education and Sport, Culture, Employment and Social Security, Health and Social Services, Constitution, and Statute of the Deputies. On 11 July 2015 she lost her party's primaries by 57 votes, receiving 40% to her rival Andrés Herzog's 43%.

After losing at UPyD's Extraordinary Congress, Irene Lozano had conversations with the organizational secretary of Citizens, Fran Hervías, which could have culminated with her integration into the party, on the condition that she be able to actively continue in politics. However, Citizens prevented Lozano's entry, citing her especially combative attitude towards the idea of seeking a pact when the two political forces engaged in negotiations. She continued to be UPyD's deputy until 16 October 2015, when she resigned from her seat and her party affiliation in order to run in the general election of 20 December 2015. She ran as an independent in position number 4 of the PSOE list to the Congress of Deputies for the district of Madrid. In addition, she joined the PSOE Experts' Committee, chosen by Pedro Sánchez to advise him on the preparation of the electoral program, as an expert in "democratic regeneration".

On 28 April 2016, Lozano announced that she would not reappear on the PSOE lists in the following general elections, citing professional reasons.

In early October 2018, it was announced that Lozano would be appointed Secretary of State for Global Spain, a newly created secretariat that would replace the High Commissioner of the Government for Brand Spain. Her appointment was completed on 13 October 2018.

== Other activities ==
- European Council on Foreign Relations (ECFR), Member of the Council

== Published works ==
=== Essays and nonfiction ===
- Lenguaje femenino, lenguaje masculino (1995). Minerva. ISBN 9788488123589.
- Federica Montseny, una anarquista en el poder (2005). Espasa. Biography. ISBN 9788467016932.
- Lenguas en guerra (2005). Espasa. ISBN 9788467005226.
- El saqueo de la imaginación (2008). Debate. ISBN 9788499927947.
- Lecciones para el inconformista aturdido en tres horas y cuarto (2009). Debate. ISBN 9788483068809.

=== Novels ===
- No, mi general (2015) with Zaida Cantera. Penguin Random House. ISBN 9788401015786.

=== Collective works ===
- Diccionario biográfico español. Academia de la Historia.
- Diccionario biobibliográfico del exilio literario de 1939. Autonomous University of Barcelona.
