= Instituto de Estudios Bursátiles =

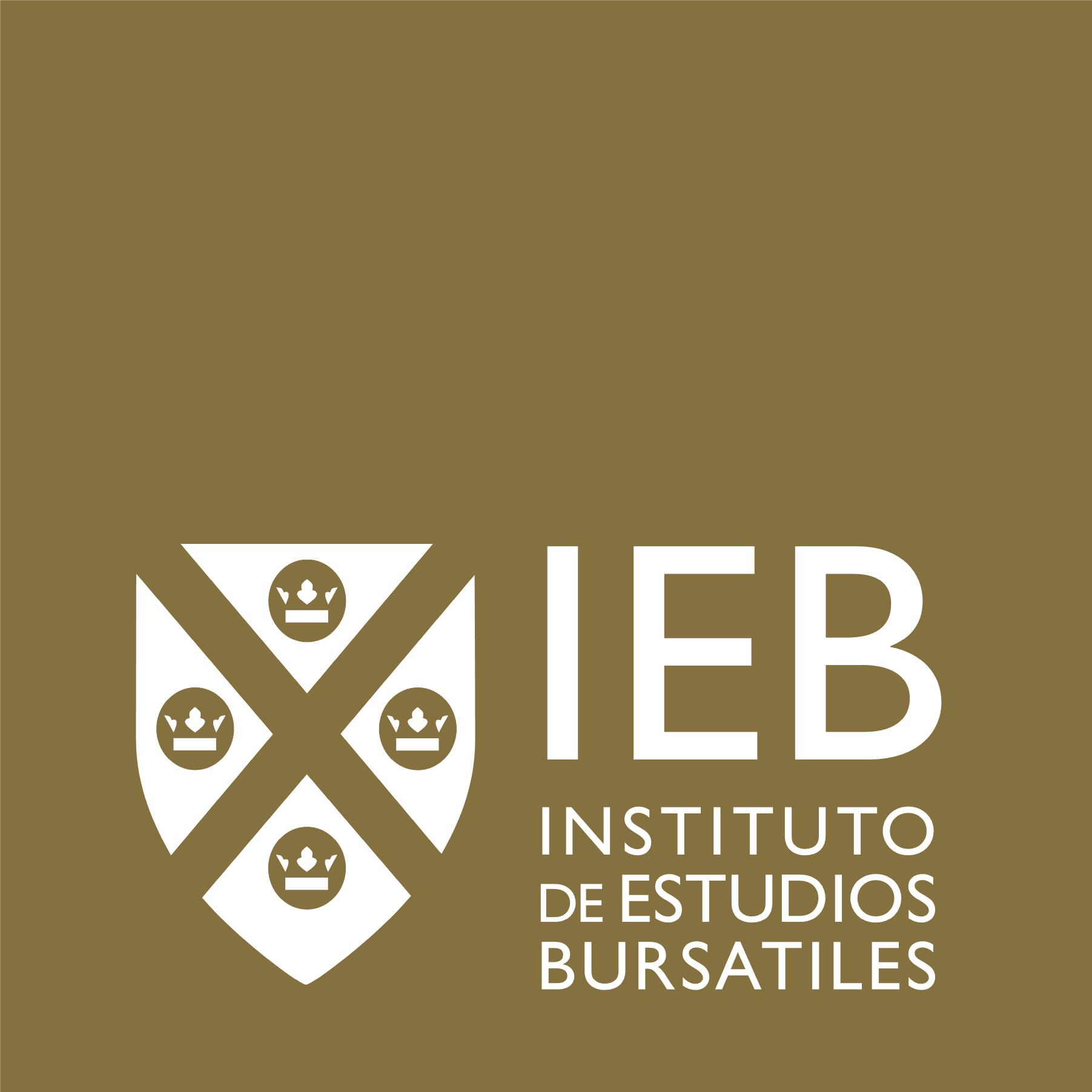
- Type: Private business school
- Established: 1989; 37 years ago
- Founder: Benito Martínez-Echevarría y Ortega
- Affiliations: Complutense University of Madrid and the King Juan Carlos University
- Location: Madrid, Spain
- Website: www.ieb.es/en

The Instituto de Estudios Bursátiles (IEB) is a university and postgraduate training centre specialising in the financial sector and located in Madrid (Spain). Founded in 1989, it is sponsored by the Madrid Stock Exchange and attached to the Complutense University of Madrid and the King Juan Carlos University.

== History ==
The institution was created with the entry into force of the 1988 Spanish Securities Market Law, which broke the monopoly of the former stock exchange and stockbrokers, and opened financial markets to professionals trained in stockmarket studies.

It was founded by Benito Martínez-Echevarría, former director of the National Institute of Statistics, with the support of Nicolás Cotoner, Antonio Barrera de Irimo, José Ramón Álvarez Rendueles, José María Michavila and Manuel Pizarro. From the outset, the IEB received the support of the then dean of the UCM Law Faculty, José Iturmendi.

The first programme offered by the IEB was the Master in Stock Exchange and Financial Markets, unique at that time; and in 1994 it introduced the double degree for students studying Law at the Complutense University to study simultaneously with the Master in Stock Exchange and Financial Markets.

IEB was launched in 2003 in partnership with London School of Economics, Wharton School of Business, Fordham University, Chinese University of Hong Kong and Bayes Business School.

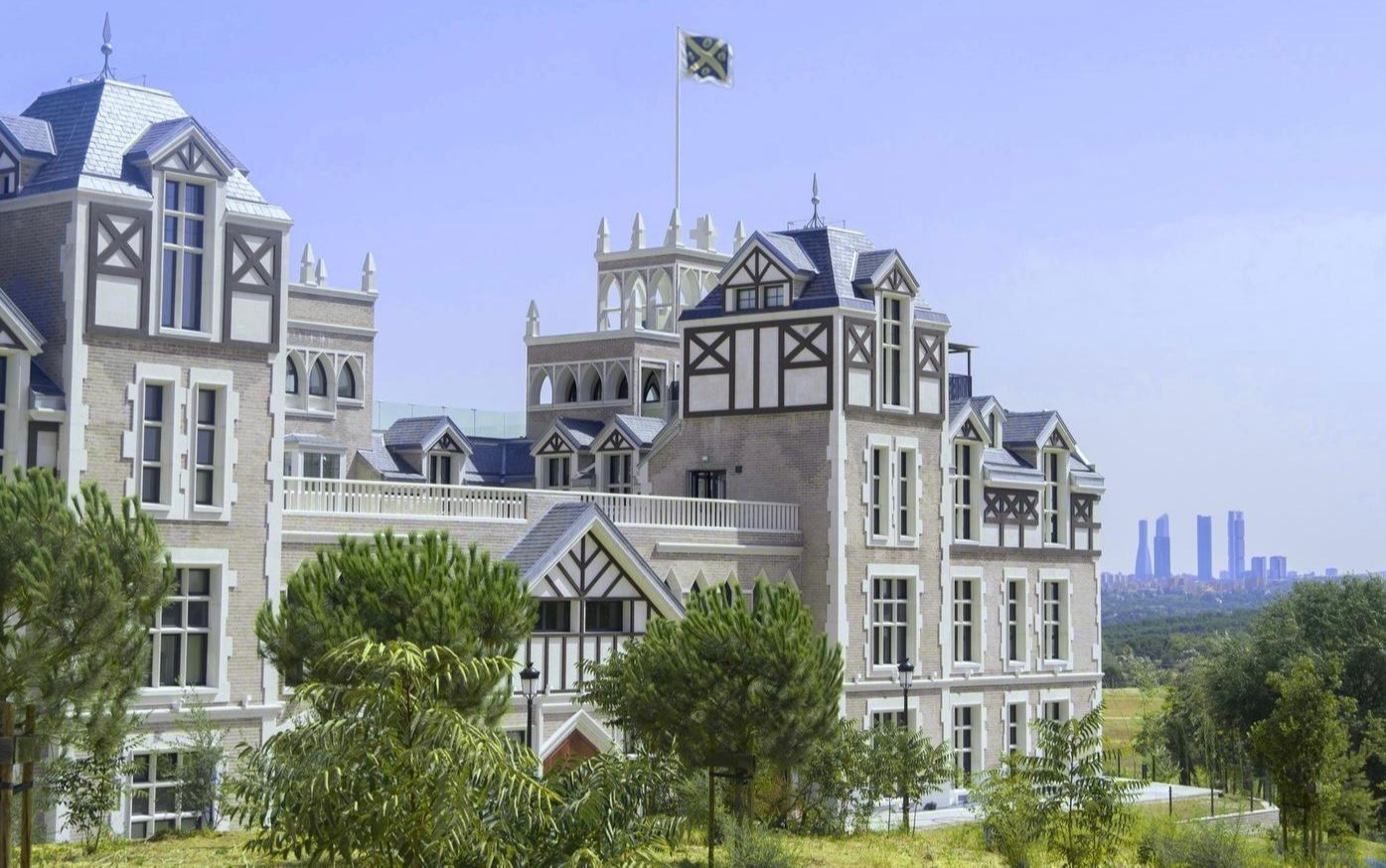

== Campus ==
In 2024 the IEB inaugurated a new campus in the Moncloa-Aravaca district of Madrid. Following the aesthetic line of the classical buildings of northern Spain in neo-Gothic architecture, the building attempts to emulate the universities of Oxford and Cambridge. The design of the interior and exterior architecture of the campus building was by Álvaro Martínez-Echevarría, director of the institution. The campus, built on a one-hectare site with 4,000 trees, has 31 classrooms equipped with technology, collaborative study areas and green spaces. The library, inspired by the Harry Potter films,^{[8]}houses an extensive collection of books on financial, legal and economic topics.

The campus has a BREEAM rating, which certifies compliance with environmental building regulations and energy efficiency.

== Academic programmes ==
It offers double diplomas: a B.A. in Law or in Economics combined with various M.A. degrees: in Stockexchange and Financial Markets, in International Relations or in Economic Analysis. The centre also offers further post-graduate M.A. degrees: Corporate Finance, International Finance or Auditing, and official Master's degrees such as Access to the Legal Profession and Procurement; training programmes to prepare for financial certifications, as well as training for companies and corporate clients, summer school and other specialisation programmes.

The different programmes are taught in Spanish and bilingually in Spanish and English. It uses the case method with the study of real current situations and the simulation system, taught by professionals in these fields.

IEB Campus in Aravaca (Madrid)
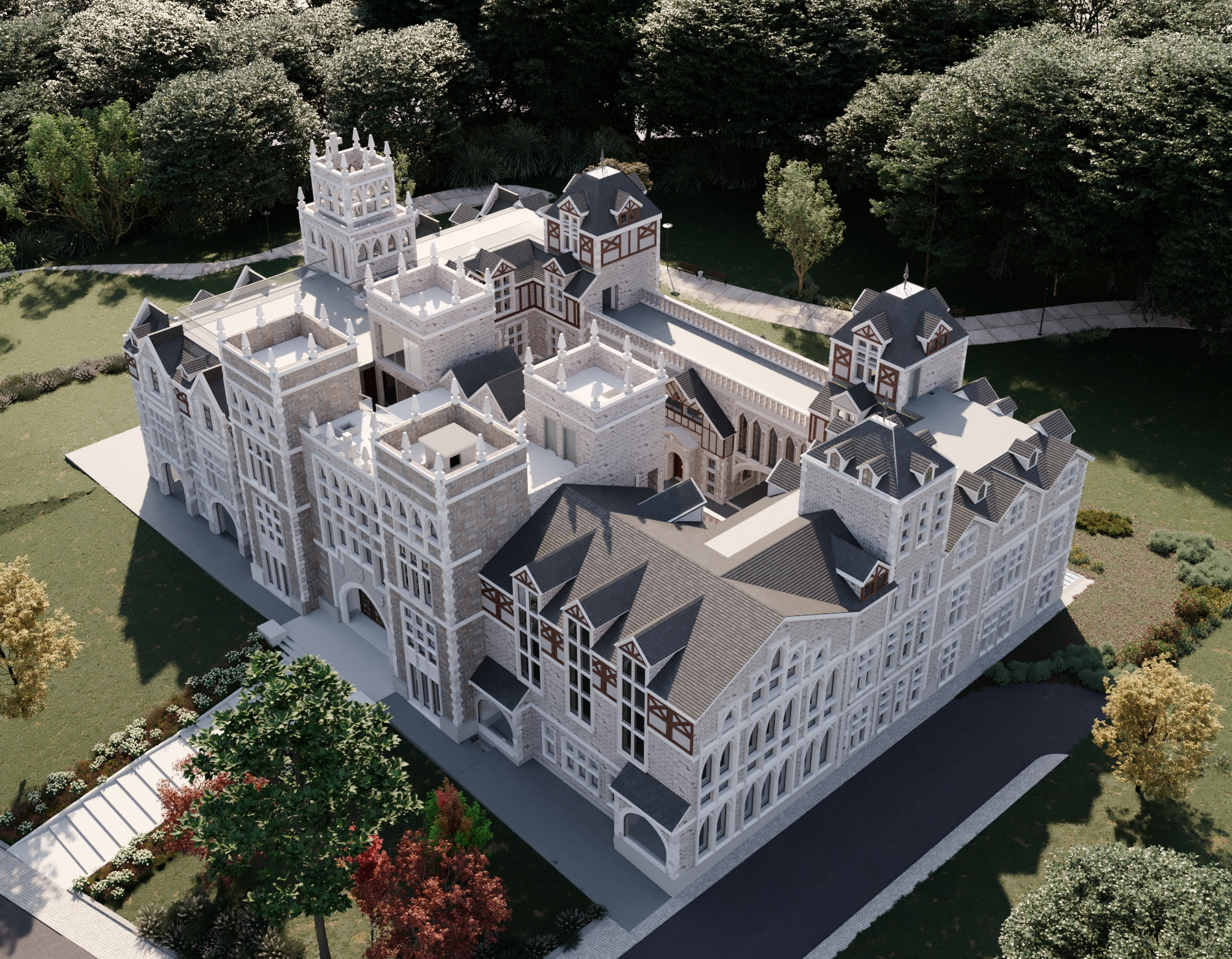
Aerial view of the campus

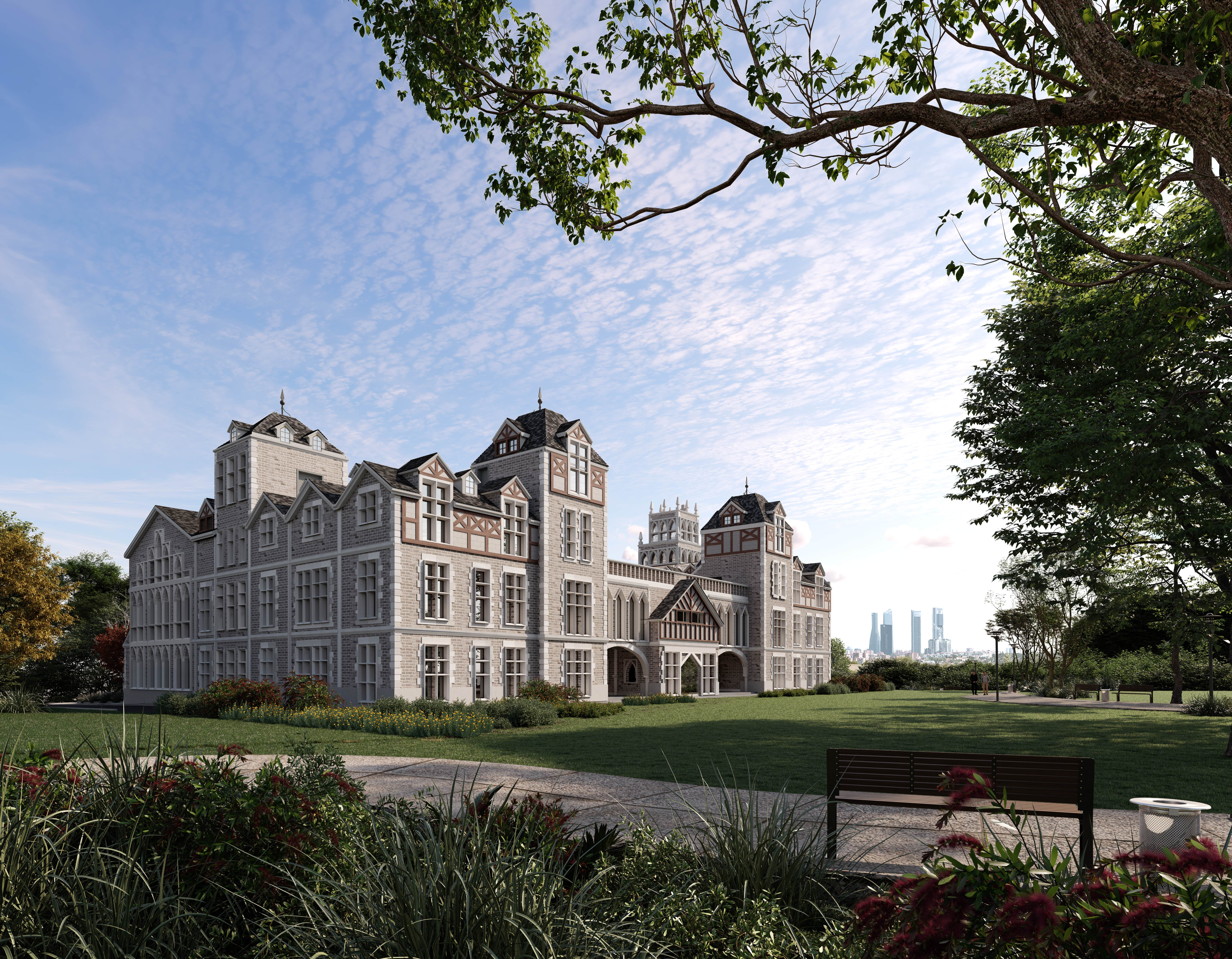
Chapel façade

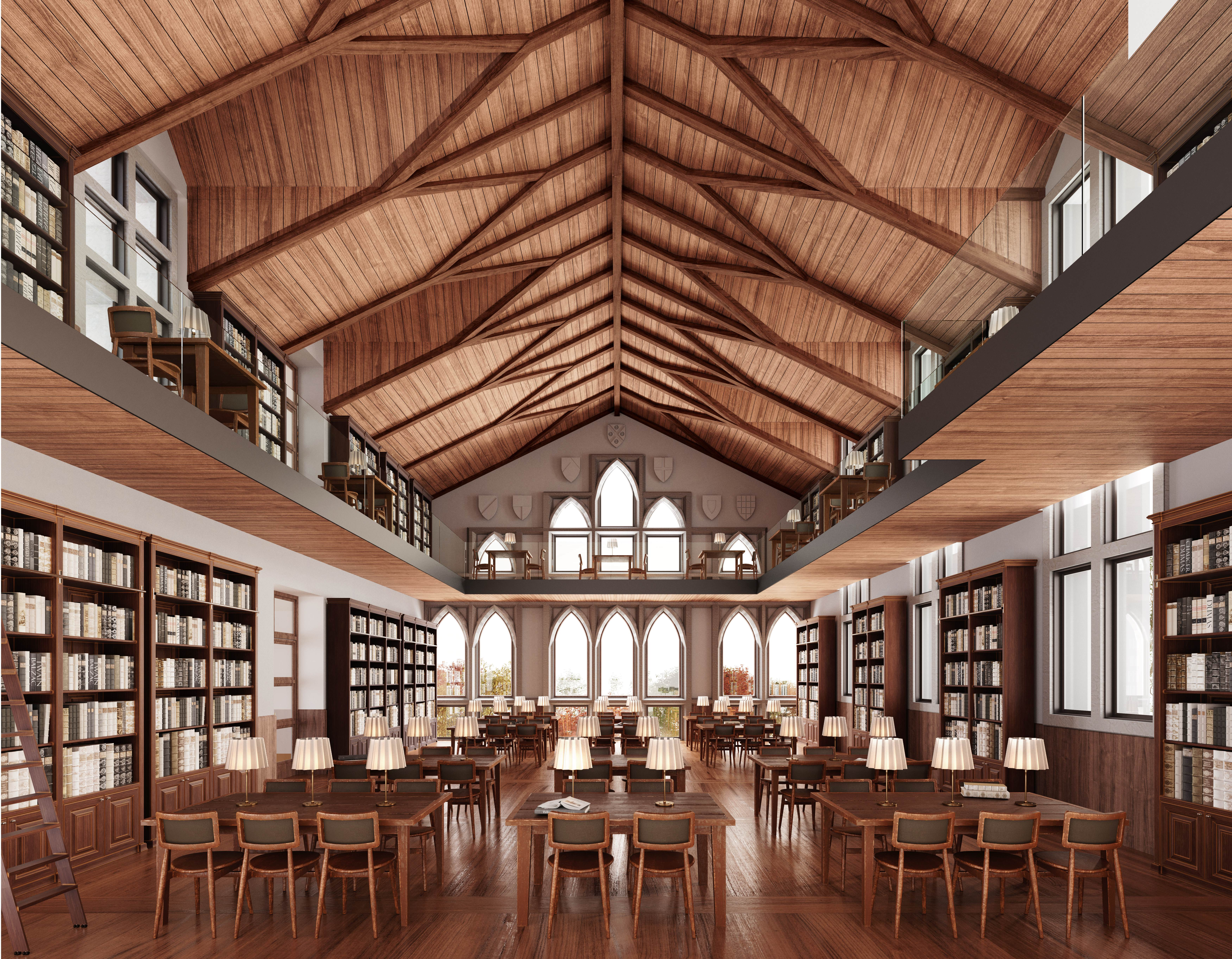
Library

== Research activities ==
Since 2010, research has been conducted through research observatories on financial advice, corporate finance, credit risk management, long-term savings and financial innovation and technology. Editorial work has resulted in publishing research derived from the various Observatories. The IEB publishes the academic journal The IEB AESTIMATIO, International Journal of Finance, whose editorial board is composed of internationally renowned professors, including two Nobel laureates: Harry Markowitz and Lawrence Klein.

== Organisation ==
The institution is governed by a team led by Álvaro Martínez-Echevarría and by a board of directors whose president is Francisco Javier Ramos Gascón, a former president of the Madrid Stock Exchange.

The faculty is made up of law and finance professionals such as Ignacio Gordillo, Jesús Santos Alonso, Roberto Knop, Silvia Iranzo, Mario Weitz, Otto Granados Roldán, and Daniel Lacalle, among others.

The IEB is present in the Consejo Latinoamericano de Escuelas de Administración (CLADEA, 2008); the Association to Advance Collegiate Schools of Business (AACSB, 2011); the European Foundation for Management Development (EFMD, 2013), and the Asociación Española de Escuelas de Dirección de Empresas AEEDE (2012).

From 2020, it will award the IEB Seal of Excellence in two categories: professional career/leadership and entrepreneurship.

As well as the annual IEB Alumnae Reunion, the IEB hosts various events to facilitate contact between students and potential employers: the Legal Careers Forum, and the Business and Finance Careers Forum, which brings together around 50 companies, and the 2023 Economy and Finance, led by women.

== IEB Alumni ==
IEB Alumni was born from the initiative of a group of alumni from different promotions. With the signing of the founding act and the Statutes, the social body of the institution's alumni was constituted as an Association. The honorary chairman is José Antonio Zarzalejos partner at KPMG, and the president is Pedro Garrido, Executive Director, BBVA Corporate & Investment Banking.

The Association annually awards two prizes for professional excellence and entrepreneurship which were awarded among others to Victoria Ross, Managing Director Digital Bank BNP Paribas Personal Finance and Laura de Rivera, Director of Regulation and Legal Services at Red Elèctrica Group.

Among the IEB alumni we can find Bruno García (politician), current mayor of Cádiz.
