= A Short History of the Future =

Book by W. Warren Wagar

A Short History of the Future is a book by W. Warren Wagar which was first published in 1989 and underwent two substantive revisions (1992 and 1999). It is a fictitious narrative history of the ensuing two centuries, from the vantage point of the year 2200. The first version imagined a far more prominent role for the Soviet Union, which collapsed shortly after the publication. The final revision incorporates a brief section on the year 1989 as a revolutionary year.

== Content ==
The first section deals with the present time leading up to Wagar's idea of the seminal event of the 21st century — a devastating nuclear conflict between Europe and the United States which is subsequently known as the "catastrophe. What emerges after the "catastrophe" is a socialist world government, which lasts for the next hundred years until the "small revolution" of the late 22nd century, the description of which closes the book.

Central to the philosophy of the "world commonwealth government" which rises after the "catastrophe" is what Wagar calls "substantialism". Wagar once stated that what he called "substantialism" in the book was his recasting of the ideas of Jean Jaurès.

== Theoretical perspectives ==
Each chapter of A Short History of the Future concludes with a selection of a diary or correspondence to give the reader a sense of the daily life of the related periods. Along with the socio-political developments of the next two hundred years, Wagar also tries to imagine the consequences of solar system colonization, the extension of the life expectancy toward 175 years, and the revision of such things as the education system and professional work.

As a historian, Wagar essentially wanted to write a book in which one could fully explore what living in a truly socialist world might be like, or an anarchic one (represented by his Small Revolution). Both are continually offered as alternatives to global capitalism without such analysis. Criticism of the book suggested that Wagar was merely replaying the history of the 20th Century along a lengthier timeline.
