= Third government of Adolfo Suárez =

3rd government of Adolfo Suárez
- Government of Spain
- 1979–1981
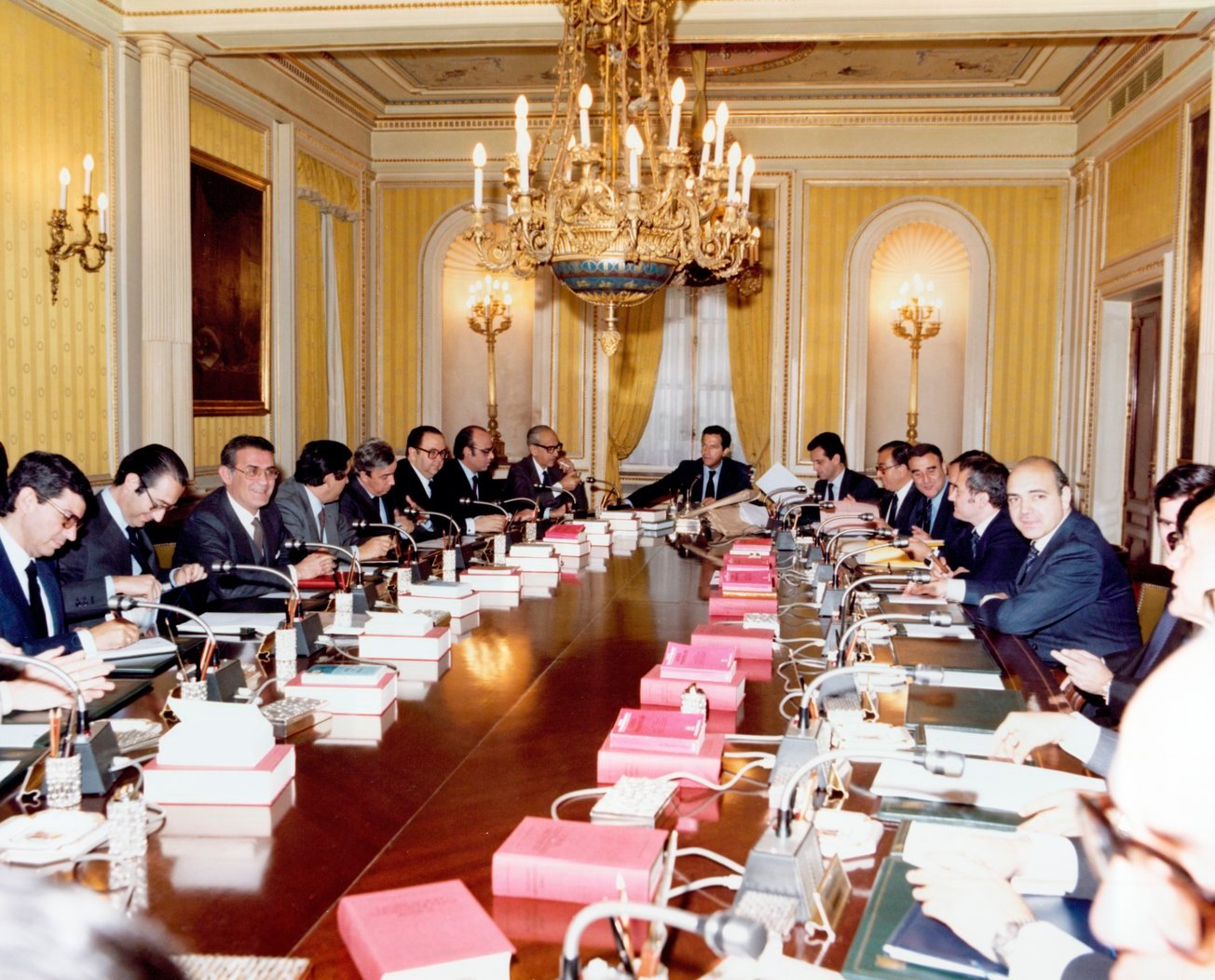
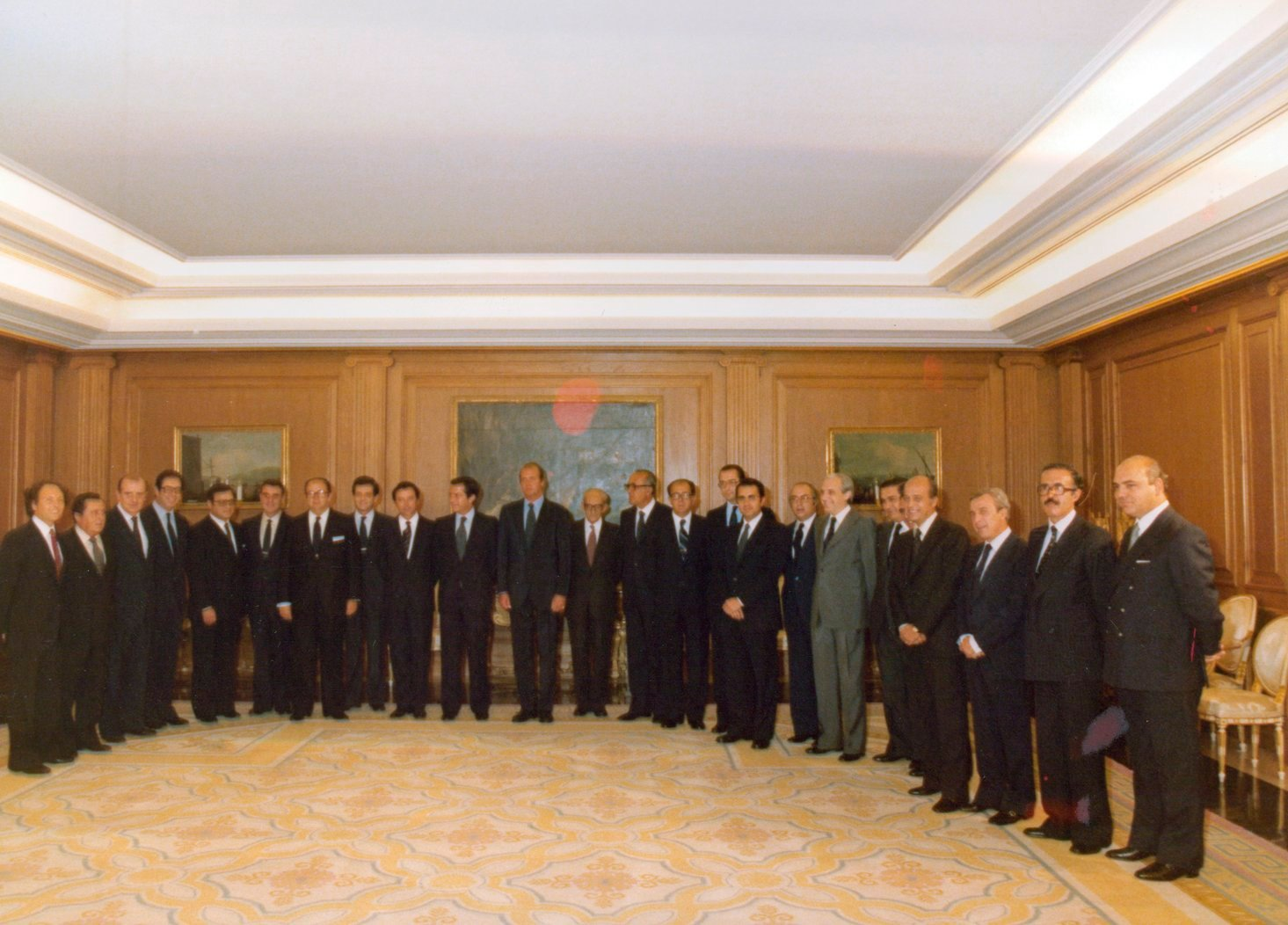
- The government in May 1980 (top) and September 1980 (bottom)
- Date formed: 6 April 1979
- Date dissolved: 27 February 1981

People and organisations
- Monarch: Juan Carlos I
- Prime Minister: Adolfo Suárez
- Deputy Prime Ministers: First: Manuel Gutiérrez Mellado; Second: Fernando Abril Martorell (1979–1980); Leopoldo Calvo-Sotelo (1980–1981)
- No. of ministers: 23 (Note: Does not include the prime minister.) (1979–1980); 22 (1980–1981)
- Total no. of members: 30
- Member party: UCD
- Status in legislature: Minority (single-party)
- Opposition party: PSOE
- Opposition leader: Felipe González

History
- Election: 1979 general election
- Legislature term: 1st Cortes Generales
- Budget: 1979, 1980, 1981
- Predecessor: Suárez II
- Successor: Calvo-Sotelo

The third government of Adolfo Suárez was formed on 6 April 1979, following the latter's election as prime minister of Spain by the Congress of Deputies on 30 March and his swearing-in on 2 April, as a result of the Union of the Democratic Centre (UCD) emerging as the largest parliamentary force at the 1979 Spanish general election. It succeeded the second Suárez government and was the government of Spain from 6 April 1979 to 27 February 1981, a total of 693 days, or 1 year, 10 months and 21 days.

Suárez's third cabinet was the first to be appointed under the Spanish Constitution of 1978, and was an all-UCD government plus two military officers (Manuel Gutiérrez Mellado and Antonio Ibáñez Freire); subsequent reshuffles in 1980 seeing would see the incorporation of a number of independents. It was automatically dismissed on 29 January 1981 as a consequence of Adolfo Suárez's resignation as prime minister, but remained in acting capacity until the next government was sworn in.

== Investiture ==
Investiture; Congress of Deputies; Nomination of Adolfo Suárez (UCD)
| Ballot → | 30 March 1979 |
| Required majority → | 176 out of 350 |
| Yes: • UCD (168); • CD (8); • PSA–PA (5); • PAR (1); • UPN (1) | 183 / 350 |
| No: • PSOE (94); • PCE–PSUC (23); • PSC (16); • PNV (6); • PSE (6); • UN (1); • ERC (1); • EE (1); • UPC (1) | 149 / 350 |
| Abstentions: • CiU (8) | 8 / 350 |
| Absentees: • PSOE (4); • HB (3); • PSC (1); • CD (1); • PNV (1) | 10 / 350 |

== Votes of confidence/no confidence ==
Motion of no confidence Congress of Deputies; Nomination of Felipe González (PSOE)
| Ballot → | 30 May 1980 |
| Required majority → | 176 out of 350 |
| Yes: • PSOE (97); • PCE–PSUC (23); • PSC (17); • PSE (6); • PSA–PA (5); • ERC (1); • EE (1); • UPC (1); • Independent (1) | 152 / 350 |
| No: • UCD (166) | 166 / 350 |
| Abstentions: • CD (9); • CiU (7); • Independents (2); • FN (1); • PAR (1); • UPN (1) | 21 / 350 |
| Absentees: • PNV (7); • HB (3); • CiU (1) | 11 / 350 |

Motion of confidence Congress of Deputies; General Policy Statement (Prime Minister)
| Ballot → | 18 September 1980 |
| Required majority → | Simple |
| Yes: • UCD (165); • CiU (8); • PSA–PA (5); • Independents (2) | 180 / 350 |
| No: • PSOE (97); • PCE–PSUC (23); • PSC (16); • CD (9); • PNV (7); • PSE (6); • FN (1); • EE (1); • UPC (1); • PAR (1); • UPN (1); • Independent (1) | 164 / 350 |
| Abstentions: • ERC (1); • Independent (1) | 2 / 350 |
| Absentees: • HB (3); • PSC (1) | 4 / 350 |

== Cabinet changes ==
Suárez's third government saw a number of cabinet changes during its tenure:

- On 17 January 1980, Manuel Clavero resigned as Minister of Culture over political differences with the Union of the Democratic Centre (UCD) on the issue of the Andalusian autonomy and his party's stance on the 28 February 1980 autonomy initiative referendum. He was replaced in the post by Ricardo de la Cierva, who was sworn into office on the following day. Suárez took the opportunity of Clavero's resignation to make another cabinet change, by transferring some of the powers from Rafael Arias-Salgado's department to José Pedro Pérez-Llorca's Ministry of the Presidency.
- On 3 May 1980, what had initially been planned as a minor cabinet readjustment intended to create a third deputy prime minister office for regional affairs under José Pedro Pérez-Llorca turned into a major reshuffle as a result of power struggles within the UCD: Antonio Ibáñez Freire (Interior), Carlos Bustelo (Industry and Energy) and Juan Antonio García Díez (Trade and Tourism) were replaced by Juan José Rosón, Ignacio Bayón and Luis Gámir, respectively. Pérez-Llorca's new appointment was limited to the Ministry of Territorial Administration, replacing Antonio Fontán, whereas Pérez-Llorca's former presidency department was reassigned to Rafael Arias-Salgado and its competences split into two additional deputy ministries headed by Sebastián Martín-Retortillo (Responsible for Public Administration) and Juan Antonio Ortega y Díaz-Ambrona (Responsible for Legislative Coordination). Salvador Sánchez-Terán was moved from Transport and Communications—which was assigned to José Luis Álvarez—to Labour (replacing Rafael Calvo Ortega) and the post of deputy minister held by Joaquín Garrigues Walker was abolished.
- The last cabinet reshuffle under Adolfo Suárez took place on 9 September 1980, on the eve of a motion of confidence called by Suárez upon his own government scheduled for 18 September, aimed at strengthening his stand within the UCD by having the most prominent figures from the party's ideological factions represented in the government. Leopoldo Calvo-Sotelo replaced Fernando Abril Martorell as Second Deputy Prime Minister, Marcelino Oreja stepped down in favour of José Pedro Pérez-Llorca as Minister of Foreign Affairs and Íñigo Cavero was moved from Justice—assigned to Francisco Fernández Ordóñez—to Culture. Further changes were seen in Education (from José Manuel Otero to Juan Antonio Ortega y Díaz-Ambrona), Labour (Sánchez-Terán was replaced by Félix Manuel Pérez Miyares) and Calvo-Sotelo's vacant ministry, Relations with the European Communities (to Eduard Punset). The reshuffle also saw the recovery of some members from former cabinets, such as Alberto Oliart (in Health and Social Security), Juan Antonio García Díez (in Economy and Trade), Rodolfo Martín Villa (in Territorial Administration) and Pío Cabanillas Gallas (as deputy minister to the Prime Minister). Meanwhile, the deputy ministry for Legislative Coordination was abolished.

== Council of Ministers ==
The Council of Ministers was structured into the offices for the prime minister, the two deputy prime ministers and 21 ministries, including a number of deputy ministers without portfolio. This number would be maintained in the May 1980 reshuffle with some changes within the deputy ministries, one of which would be abolished in the September 1980 reshuffle.

← Suárez III Government → (6 April 1979 – 27 February 1981)
| Portfolio | Name | Party | Took office | Left office | Ref. |
| Prime Minister | Adolfo Suárez | UCD | 2 April 1979 | 26 February 1981 | |
| First Deputy Prime Minister, in charge of the Coordination of the National Security and Defence Affairs | Manuel Gutiérrez Mellado | Military | 6 April 1979 | 27 February 1981 | |
| Second Deputy Prime Minister, in charge of the Coordination of Economic Affairs | Fernando Abril Martorell | UCD | 6 April 1979 | 9 September 1980 | |
| Minister of Foreign Affairs | Marcelino Oreja | UCD | 6 April 1979 | 9 September 1980 | |
| Minister of Justice | Íñigo Cavero | UCD | 6 April 1979 | 9 September 1980 | |
| Minister of Defence | Agustín Rodríguez Sahagún | UCD | 6 April 1979 | 27 February 1981 | |
| Minister of Finance | Jaime García Añoveros | UCD | 6 April 1979 | 27 February 1981 | |
| Minister of the Interior | Antonio Ibáñez Freire | Military | 6 April 1979 | 3 May 1980 | |
| Minister of Public Works and Urbanism | Jesús Sancho Rof | UCD | 6 April 1979 | 27 February 1981 | |
| Minister of Education | José Manuel Otero | UCD | 6 April 1979 | 9 September 1980 | |
| Minister of Labour | Rafael Calvo Ortega | UCD | 6 April 1979 | 3 May 1980 | |
| Minister of Industry and Energy | Carlos Bustelo | UCD | 6 April 1979 | 3 May 1980 | |
| Minister of Agriculture | Jaime Lamo de Espinosa | UCD | 6 April 1979 | 27 February 1981 | |
| Minister of Trade and Tourism | Juan Antonio García Díez | UCD | 6 April 1979 | 3 May 1980 | |
| Minister of the Presidency | José Pedro Pérez-Llorca | UCD | 6 April 1979 | 3 May 1980 | |
| Minister of Economy | José Luis Leal | UCD | 6 April 1979 | 9 September 1980 | |
| Minister of Transport and Communications | Salvador Sánchez-Terán | UCD | 6 April 1979 | 3 May 1980 | |
| Minister of Health and Social Security | Juan Rovira Tarazona | UCD | 6 April 1979 | 9 September 1980 | |
| Minister of Culture | Manuel Clavero | UCD | 6 April 1979 | 17 January 1980 | |
| Deputy Minister to the Prime Minister, without portfolio | Joaquín Garrigues Walker | UCD | 6 April 1979 | 3 May 1980 | |
| Minister for Relations with the European Communities, without portfolio | Leopoldo Calvo-Sotelo | UCD | 6 April 1979 | 9 September 1980 | |
| Deputy Minister for Relations with the Cortes, without portfolio | Rafael Arias-Salgado | UCD | 6 April 1979 | 18 January 1980 | |
| Minister of Territorial Administration | Antonio Fontán | UCD | 6 April 1979 | 3 May 1980 | |
| Minister of Universities and Research | Luis González Seara | UCD | 6 April 1979 | 27 February 1981 | |
=== Changes January 1980 ===
| Portfolio | Name | Party | Took office | Left office | Ref. |
| Minister of Culture | Ricardo de la Cierva | UCD | 18 January 1980 | 9 September 1980 | |
| Deputy Minister to the Prime Minister, without portfolio | Rafael Arias-Salgado | UCD | 18 January 1980 | 3 May 1980 | |
=== Changes May 1980 ===
| Portfolio | Name | Party | Took office | Left office | Ref. |
| Minister of the Interior | Juan José Rosón | UCD | 3 May 1980 | 27 February 1981 | |
| Minister of Labour | Salvador Sánchez-Terán | UCD | 3 May 1980 | 9 September 1980 | |
| Minister of Industry and Energy | Ignacio Bayón | Independent | 3 May 1980 | 27 February 1981 | |
| Minister of Trade and Tourism | Luis Gámir | UCD | 3 May 1980 | 9 September 1980 | |
| Minister of the Presidency | Rafael Arias-Salgado | UCD | 3 May 1980 | 27 February 1981 | |
| Minister of Transport and Communications | José Luis Álvarez | UCD | 3 May 1980 | 27 February 1981 | |
| ~~Deputy Minister to the Prime Minister, without portfolio~~ | Discontinued on 3 May 1980 upon the officeholder's dismissal. | | | | |
| Minister of Territorial Administration | José Pedro Pérez-Llorca | UCD | 3 May 1980 | 9 September 1980 | |
| ~~Deputy Minister to the Prime Minister, without portfolio~~ | Discontinued on 3 May 1980 upon the officeholder's dismissal. | | | | |
| Deputy Minister to the Prime Minister, without portfolio, in charge of Public Administration | Sebastián Martín-Retortillo | UCD | 3 May 1980 | 27 February 1981 | |
| Deputy Minister to the Prime Minister, without portfolio, in charge of Legislative Coordination | Juan Antonio Ortega y Díaz-Ambrona | UCD | 3 May 1980 | 9 September 1980 | |
=== Changes September 1980 ===
| Portfolio | Name | Party | Took office | Left office | Ref. |
| Second Deputy Prime Minister, in charge of the Coordination of Economic Affairs | Leopoldo Calvo-Sotelo | UCD | 9 September 1980 | 27 February 1981 | |
| Minister of Foreign Affairs | José Pedro Pérez-Llorca | UCD | 9 September 1980 | 27 February 1981 | |
| Minister of Justice | Francisco Fernández Ordóñez | UCD | 9 September 1980 | 27 February 1981 | |
| Minister of Education | Juan Antonio Ortega y Díaz-Ambrona | UCD | 9 September 1980 | 27 February 1981 | |
| Minister of Labour | Félix Manuel Pérez Miyares | UCD | 9 September 1980 | 27 February 1981 | |
| Minister of Economy; Minister of Trade | Juan Antonio García Díez | UCD | 9 September 1980 | 7 October 1980 | |
| Minister of Health and Social Security | Alberto Oliart | Independent (Note: Joined the UCD in December 1980.) | 9 September 1980 | 27 February 1981 | |
| Minister of Territorial Administration | Rodolfo Martín Villa | UCD | 9 September 1980 | 27 February 1981 | |
| Minister of Culture | Íñigo Cavero | UCD | 9 September 1980 | 27 February 1981 | |
| Deputy Minister to the Prime Minister, without portfolio | Pío Cabanillas Gallas | UCD | 9 September 1980 | 27 February 1981 | |
| Minister for Relations with the European Communities, without portfolio | Eduard Punset | UCD | 9 September 1980 | 27 February 1981 | |
| ~~Deputy Minister to the Prime Minister, without portfolio,~~ ~~in charge of Legislative Coordination~~ | Discontinued on 9 September 1980 upon the officeholder's dismissal. | | | | |
=== Changes October 1980 ===
| Portfolio | Name | Party | Took office | Left office | Ref. |
| Minister of Economy and Trade (Note: On 7 October 1980, the ministries of Economy and the Trade were restructured and merged into the newly-established Ministry of Economy and Trade.) | Juan Antonio García Díez | UCD | 7 October 1980 | 27 February 1981 | |
| ~~Minister of Trade~~ | Disestablished on 7 October 1980. | | | | |

== Departmental structure ==
Adolfo Suárez's third government was organised into several superior and governing units, whose number, powers and hierarchical structure varied depending on the ministerial department.

Unit/body rank

- (■) Secretary of state
- (■) Undersecretary
- (■) Director-general
- (●) Autonomous agency
- (◆) Military & intelligence agency

| Office (Original name) | Portrait | Name | Took office | Left office | Alliance/party | Ref. |
=== Prime Minister's Office ===
| Prime Minister (Presidencia del Gobierno) | | Adolfo Suárez | 2 April 1979 | 26 February 1981 (resigned) | UCD | |
| First Deputy Prime Minister, in charge of the Coordination of the Security and National Defence; Affairs (Vicepresidencia Primera del Gobierno, encargada de la coordinación de los asuntos de la Seguridad y Defensa Nacional) | | Manuel Gutiérrez Mellado | 6 April 1979 | 27 February 1981 | UCD (Military) | |
| Second Deputy Prime Minister, in charge of the Coordination of the Economic Affairs (Vicepresidencia Segunda del Gobierno, encargada de la coordinación de los asuntos económicos) | | Fernando Abril Martorell | 6 April 1979 | 9 September 1980 | UCD | |
| Second Deputy Prime Minister, in charge of the Coordination of the Economic Affairs (Vicepresidencia Segunda del Gobierno, encargada de la coordinación de los asuntos económicos) | | Leopoldo Calvo-Sotelo | 9 September 1980 | 27 February 1981 | UCD | |
=== Ministry of Foreign Affairs ===
| Ministry of Foreign Affairs (Ministerio de Asuntos Exteriores) | | Marcelino Oreja | 6 April 1979 | 9 September 1980 | UCD | |
| Ministry of Foreign Affairs (Ministerio de Asuntos Exteriores) | | José Pedro Pérez-Llorca | 9 September 1980 | 27 February 1981 | UCD | |
| Ministry of Foreign Affairs (Ministerio de Asuntos Exteriores) | 2 May 1979 – 28 February 1981: (■) State Secretariat for Foreign Affairs; (■) Undersecretariat of Foreign Affairs; (■) Technical General Secretariat; (■) Directorate-General for Foreign Policy for Europe and Atlantic Affairs; (■) Directorate-General for Foreign Policy for North America and the Pacific; (■) Directorate-General for Foreign Policy for Africa and Continental Asia; (■) Directorate-General for Foreign Policy for Ibero-America; (■) Directorate-General for the Foreign Service; (■) Directorate-General for International Economic Relations; (■) Directorate-General for Cultural Relations; (■) Directorate-General for Consular Affairs; (■) Directorate-General for International Technical Coordination; (■) Directorate-General for International Organizations and Conferences; (■) Directorate-General of the Office for Diplomatic Information; (■) Service for Protocol, Chancery and Orders–First Introducer of Ambassadors | | | | | |
=== Ministry of Justice ===
| Ministry of Justice (Ministerio de Justicia) | | Íñigo Cavero | 6 April 1979 | 9 September 1980 | UCD | |
| Ministry of Justice (Ministerio de Justicia) | | Francisco Fernández Ordóñez | 9 September 1980 | 27 February 1981 | UCD | |
| Ministry of Justice (Ministerio de Justicia) | 10 May 1979 – 17 August 1985: (■) Undersecretariat of Justice; (■) Technical General Secretariat; (■) Directorate-General for Justice (disest. 7 Nov 1980); (■) Technical Secretariat for Relations with the Administration of Justice (est. 7 Nov 1980); (■) Directorate-General for Religious Affairs; (■) Directorate-General for Registries and Notaries; (■) Directorate-General for Penitentiary Institutions | | | | | |
=== Ministry of Defence ===
| Ministry of Defence (Ministerio de Defensa) | | Agustín Rodríguez Sahagún | 6 April 1979 | 27 February 1981 | UCD | |
=== Ministry of Finance ===
| Ministry of Finance (Ministerio de Hacienda) | | Jaime García Añoveros | 6 April 1979 | 27 February 1981 | UCD | |
| Ministry of Finance (Ministerio de Hacienda) | 5 July 1977 – 8 December 1982: (■) Undersecretariat of Finance; (■) Undersecretariat of Budgets and Public Expenditure; (■) Directorate-General for the Treasury; (■) Directorate-General for Budgets; (■) Directorate-General for the State Heritage; (■) Directorate-General for Insurance; (■) Directorate-General for Customs; (■) Directorate-General for State Litigation; (■) Directorate-General for Taxes; (■) Directorate-General for Tax Inspection and Investigation; (■) Office of the Comptroller General of the State Administration; (■) Technical General Secretariat | | | | | |
=== Ministry of the Interior ===
| Ministry of the Interior (Ministerio del Interior) | | Antonio Ibáñez Freire | 6 April 1979 | 3 May 1980 | UCD (Military) | |
| Ministry of the Interior (Ministerio del Interior) | | Juan José Rosón | 3 May 1980 | 27 February 1981 | UCD | |
=== Ministry of Public Works and Urbanism ===
| Ministry of Public Works and Urbanism (Ministerio de Obras Públicas y Urbanismo) | | Jesús Sancho Rof | 6 April 1979 | 27 February 1981 | UCD | |
=== Ministry of Education ===
| Ministry of Education (Ministerio de Educación) | | José Manuel Otero | 6 April 1979 | 9 September 1980 | UCD | |
| Ministry of Education (Ministerio de Educación) | | Juan Antonio Ortega y Díaz-Ambrona | 9 September 1980 | 27 February 1981 | UCD | |
=== Ministry of Labour ===
| Ministry of Labour (Ministerio de Trabajo) | | Rafael Calvo Ortega | 6 April 1979 | 3 May 1980 | UCD | |
| Ministry of Labour (Ministerio de Trabajo) | | Salvador Sánchez-Terán | 3 May 1980 | 9 September 1980 | UCD | |
| Ministry of Labour (Ministerio de Trabajo) | | Félix Manuel Pérez Miyares | 9 September 1980 | 27 February 1981 | UCD | |
=== Ministry of Industry and Energy ===
| Ministry of Industry and Energy (Ministerio de Industria y Energía) | | Carlos Bustelo | 6 April 1979 | 3 May 1980 | UCD | |
| Ministry of Industry and Energy (Ministerio de Industria y Energía) | | Ignacio Bayón | 3 May 1980 | 27 February 1981 | UCD (Independent) | |
| Ministry of Industry and Energy (Ministerio de Industria y Energía) | 5 July 1977 – 4 July 1979: (■) Undersecretariat of Industry and Energy; (■) Technical General Secretariat; (■) Directorate-General for Mines and Construction Industries; (■) Directorate-General for Energy; (■) Directorate-General for Steel and Naval Industries; (■) Directorate-General for Chemical and Textile Industries; (■) Directorate-General for Food and Miscellaneous Industries; (■) Directorate-General for Industrial Promotion and Technology; 4 July 1979 – 7 October 1980: (■) Undersecretariat of Industry and Energy; (■) Directorate-General for Services; (■) Commissariat for Energy and Mineral Resources; (■) Technical General Secretariat; (■) Directorate-General for Mines and Construction Industries; (■) Directorate-General for Energy; (■) Directorate-General for Steel and Naval Industries; (■) Directorate-General for Chemical and Textile Industries; (■) Directorate-General for Food and Miscellaneous Industries; (■) Directorate-General for Industrial Technology and Security; 7 October 1980 – 8 December 1982: (■) Undersecretariat of Industry and Energy; (■) Directorate-General for Services (disest. 15 Oct 1980); (■) Commissariat for Energy and Mineral Resources; (■) Technical General Secretariat; (■) Directorate-General for Mines; (■) Directorate-General for Energy; (■) Directorate-General for Steel and Naval Industries; (■) Directorate-General for Chemical, Textile and Pharmaceutical Industries; (■) Directorate-General for Automotive and Construction Industries; (■) Directorate-General for Electronics and Informatics; (■) Directorate-General for Food Industries and the Small and Medium-sized Industry; (■) Directorate-General for Industrial Innovation and Technology | | | | | |
=== Ministry of Agriculture ===
| Ministry of Agriculture (Ministerio de Agricultura) | | Jaime Lamo de Espinosa | 6 April 1979 | 27 February 1981 | UCD | |
=== Ministry of Trade and Tourism ===
| Ministry of Trade and Tourism (Ministerio de Comercio y Turismo) (until 9 September 1980) | | Juan Antonio García Díez | 6 April 1979 | 3 May 1980 | UCD | |
| Ministry of Trade and Tourism (Ministerio de Comercio y Turismo) (until 9 September 1980) | | Luis Gámir | 3 May 1980 | 9 September 1980 | UCD | |
=== Ministry of the Presidency ===
| Ministry of the Presidency (Ministerio de la Presidencia) | | José Pedro Pérez-Llorca | 6 April 1979 | 3 May 1980 | UCD | |
| Ministry of the Presidency (Ministerio de la Presidencia) | | Rafael Arias-Salgado | 3 May 1980 | 27 February 1981 | UCD | |
=== Ministry of Economy ===
| Ministry of Economy (Ministerio de Economía) (until 9 September 1980) Ministry of Economy; Ministry of Trade (Ministerio de Economía; Ministerio de Comercio) (9 September – 7 October 1980) Ministry of Economy and Trade (Ministerio de Economía y Comercio) (from 7 October 1980) | | José Luis Leal | 6 April 1979 | 9 September 1980 | UCD | |
| Ministry of Economy (Ministerio de Economía) (until 9 September 1980) Ministry of Economy; Ministry of Trade (Ministerio de Economía; Ministerio de Comercio) (9 September – 7 October 1980) Ministry of Economy and Trade (Ministerio de Economía y Comercio) (from 7 October 1980) | | Juan Antonio García Díez | 9 September 1980 | 27 February 1981 | UCD | |
| Ministry of Economy (Ministerio de Economía) (until 9 September 1980) Ministry of Economy; Ministry of Trade (Ministerio de Economía; Ministerio de Comercio) (9 September – 7 October 1980) Ministry of Economy and Trade (Ministerio de Economía y Comercio) (from 7 October 1980) | 7 October 1980 – 7 March 1981: (■) Undersecretariat of Economy; (■) Directorate-General for Economic Policy and Forecast; (■) Directorate-General for Planning; (■) Directorate-General for Financial Policy; (■) Directorate-General for the National Institute of Statistics; (■) Directorate-General for Competition and Consumer Affairs; (■) Directorate-General for Trade Management; (■) Directorate-General for Coordination and Services; (■) Undersecretariat of Trade; (■) Directorate-General for Trade Policy; (■) Directorate-General for Tariff Policy and Imports; (■) Directorate-General for Exports; (■) Directorate-General for Foreign Transactions; (■) Technical General Secretariat | | | | | |
=== Ministry of Transport and Communications ===
| Ministry of Transport and Communications (Ministerio de Transportes y Comunicaciones) | | Salvador Sánchez-Terán | 6 April 1979 | 3 May 1980 | UCD | |
| Ministry of Transport and Communications (Ministerio de Transportes y Comunicaciones) | | José Luis Álvarez | 3 May 1980 | 27 February 1981 | UCD | |
=== Ministry of Health and Social Security ===
| Ministry of Health and Social Security (Ministerio de Sanidad y Seguridad Social) | | Juan Rovira Tarazona | 6 April 1979 | 9 September 1980 | UCD | |
| Ministry of Health and Social Security (Ministerio de Sanidad y Seguridad Social) | | Alberto Oliart | 9 September 1980 | 27 February 1981 | UCD (UCD from Dec 1980; Indep. until Dec 1980) | |
=== Ministry of Culture ===
| Ministry of Culture (Ministerio de Cultura) | | Manuel Clavero | 6 April 1979 | 17 January 1980 (resigned) | UCD | |
| Ministry of Culture (Ministerio de Cultura) | | Ricardo de la Cierva | 18 January 1980 | 9 September 1980 | UCD | |
| Ministry of Culture (Ministerio de Cultura) | | Íñigo Cavero | 9 September 1980 | 27 February 1981 | UCD | |
=== Ministry of Territorial Administration ===
| Ministry of Territorial Administration (Ministerio de Administración; Territorial) | | Antonio Fontán | 6 April 1979 | 3 May 1980 | UCD | |
| Ministry of Territorial Administration (Ministerio de Administración; Territorial) | | José Pedro Pérez-Llorca | 3 May 1980 | 9 September 1980 | UCD | |
| Ministry of Territorial Administration (Ministerio de Administración; Territorial) | | Rodolfo Martín Villa | 9 September 1980 | 27 February 1981 | UCD | |
=== Ministry of Universities and Research ===
| Ministry of Universities and Research (Ministerio de Universidades e Investigación) | | Luis González Seara | 6 April 1979 | 27 February 1981 | UCD | |
=== Ministers without portfolio ===
| Deputy Minister to the Prime Minister, without portfolio (Ministro adjunto al Presidente, sin cartera) (until 3 May 1980) | | Joaquín Garrigues Walker | 6 April 1979 | 3 May 1980 | UCD | |
| Minister for Relations with the European Communities, without portfolio (Ministro para las Relaciones con las Comunidades Europeas, sin cartera) | | Leopoldo Calvo-Sotelo | 6 April 1979 | 9 September 1980 | UCD | |
| Minister for Relations with the European Communities, without portfolio (Ministro para las Relaciones con las Comunidades Europeas, sin cartera) | | Eduard Punset | 9 September 1980 | 27 February 1981 | UCD | |
| Deputy Minister for Relations with the Cortes, without portfolio (Ministro adjunto para las Relaciones con las Cortes, sin cartera) (until 18 January 1980) Deputy Minister to the Prime Minister, without portfolio (Ministro adjunto al Presidente, sin cartera) (18 January – 3 May 1980) | | Rafael Arias-Salgado | 6 April 1979 | 3 May 1980 | UCD | |
| Deputy Minister to the Prime Minister, without portfolio, in charge of Public; Administration (Ministro adjunto al Presidente, sin cartera, encargado de la Administración Pública) (from 3 May 1980) | | Sebastián Martín-Retortillo | 3 May 1980 | 27 February 1981 | UCD | |
| Deputy Minister to the Prime Minister, without portfolio, in charge of Legislative; Coordination (Ministro adjunto al Presidente, sin cartera, encargado de la Coordinación Legislativa) (3 May – 9 September 1980) | | Juan Antonio Ortega y Díaz-Ambrona | 3 May 1980 | 9 September 1980 | UCD | |
| Deputy Minister to the Prime Minister, without portfolio (Ministro adjunto al Presidente, sin cartera) (from 9 September 1980) | | Pío Cabanillas Gallas | 9 September 1980 | 27 February 1981 | UCD | |

== Notes ==
| Preceded by Suárez II | Government of Spain; 1979–1981 | Succeeded by Calvo-Sotelo |
