= Government of Leopoldo Calvo-Sotelo =

- Government of Spain
- 1981–1982
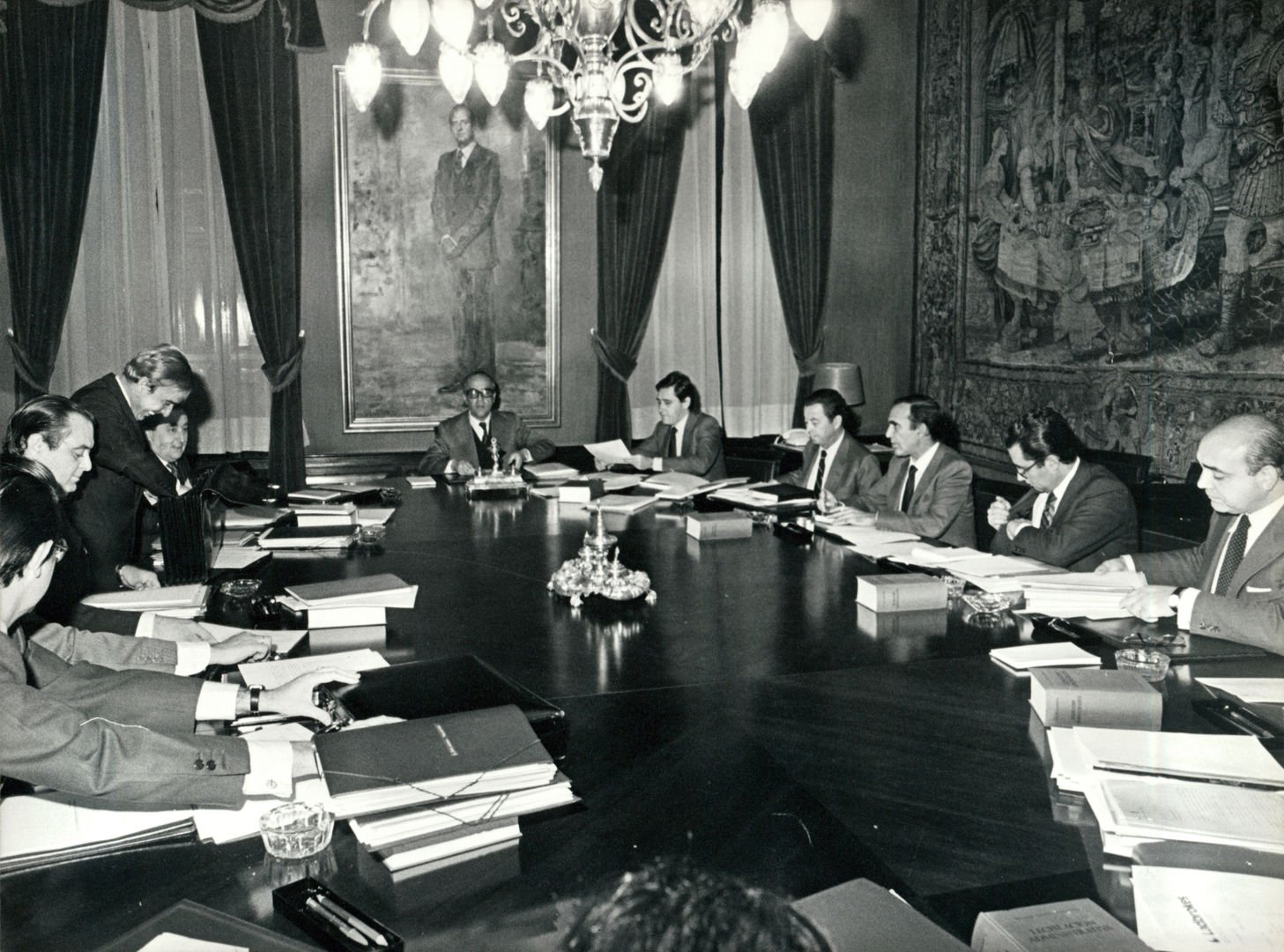
- The government in November 1981
- Date formed: 27 February 1981
- Date dissolved: 3 December 1982

People and organisations
- Monarch: Juan Carlos I
- Prime Minister: Leopoldo Calvo-Sotelo
- Deputy Prime Ministers: First: Juan Antonio García Díez (1981–1982); Second: Rodolfo Martín Villa (1981–1982)
- No. of ministers: 15 (Note: Does not include the prime minister.) (1981; 1982); 17 (1981–1982)
- Total no. of members: 24
- Member party: UCD
- Status in legislature: Minority (single-party)
- Opposition party: PSOE
- Opposition leader: Felipe González

History
- Outgoing election: 1982 general election
- Legislature term: 1st Cortes Generales
- Budget: 1982
- Predecessor: Suárez III
- Successor: González I

The government of Leopoldo Calvo-Sotelo was formed on 27 February 1981, following the latter's election as prime minister of Spain by the Congress of Deputies on 25 February and his swearing-in on 26 February, as a result of Adolfo Suárez's resignation from the post on 29 January 1981. It succeeded the third Suárez government and was the government of Spain from 27 February 1981 to 3 December 1982, a total of 644 days, or 1 year, 9 months and 6 days.

Calvo-Sotelo's cabinet was composed mainly by members of the Union of the Democratic Centre (UCD) and a number of independents. It was automatically dismissed on 29 October 1982 as a consequence of the 1982 general election, but remained in acting capacity until the next government was sworn in.

== Investiture ==
Investiture; Congress of Deputies; Nomination of Leopoldo Calvo-Sotelo (UCD)
Ballot →	21 February 1981	23 February 1981	25 February 1981
Required majority →	176 out of 350	~~Simple~~	Simple
Yes: • UCD (165); • CD (9) (3 on 21 Feb); • CiU (9) (on 25 Feb); • PAR (1) (on 25 Feb); • UPN (1); • UA (1) (on 25 Feb)	169 / 350	Cancelled (as a result of a coup attempt)	186 / 350
No: • PSOE (95); • PCE–PSUC (23); • PSC (16); • PNV (7); • PSE (6); • PSA–PA (4); • Independents (3); • FN (1); • ERC (1); • EE (1); • UPC (1)	158 / 350	Cancelled (as a result of a coup attempt)	158 / 350
Abstentions: • CiU (9) (on 21 Feb); • CD (6) (on 21 Feb); • PAR (1) (on 21 Feb); • UA (1) (on 21 Feb)	17 / 350	Cancelled (as a result of a coup attempt)	0 / 350
Absentees: • HB (3); • PSOE (2) (1 on 21 Feb); • PSC (1); • PSA–PA (1) (on 21 Feb)	6 / 350	Cancelled (as a result of a coup attempt)	6 / 350

== Council of Ministers ==
The Council of Ministers was structured into the offices for the prime minister and 15 ministries. From December 1981, the council would include two deputy prime ministers and a deputy ministry to the Prime Minister, without portfolio. From July 1982, the council would only include one deputy prime minister and the abolition of the deputy ministry to the Prime Minister.

← Calvo-Sotelo Government → (27 February 1981 – 3 December 1982)
Portfolio	Name	Party	Took office	Left office	Ref.
Prime Minister	Leopoldo Calvo-Sotelo	UCD	26 February 1981	2 December 1982	
Minister of Foreign Affairs	José Pedro Pérez-Llorca	UCD	27 February 1981	3 December 1982	
Minister of Justice	Francisco Fernández Ordóñez	UCD	27 February 1981	31 August 1981	
Minister of Defence	Alberto Oliart	UCD	27 February 1981	3 December 1982	
Minister of Finance	Jaime García Añoveros	UCD	27 February 1981	3 December 1982	
Minister of the Interior	Juan José Rosón	UCD	27 February 1981	3 December 1982	
Minister of Public Works and Urbanism	Luis Ortiz González	UCD	27 February 1981	3 December 1982	
Minister of Education; Minister of Universities and Research	Juan Antonio Ortega y Díaz-Ambrona	UCD	27 February 1981	7 March 1981	
Minister of Labour; Minister of Health and Social Security	Jesús Sancho Rof	UCD	27 February 1981	7 March 1981	
Minister of Industry and Energy	Ignacio Bayón	Independent	27 February 1981	3 December 1982	
Minister of Agriculture	Jaime Lamo de Espinosa	UCD	27 February 1981	14 May 1981	
Minister of Economy and Trade	Juan Antonio García Díez	UCD	27 February 1981	2 December 1981	
Minister of the Presidency	Pío Cabanillas Gallas	UCD	27 February 1981	1 September 1981	
Minister of Transport and Communications	José Luis Álvarez	UCD	27 February 1981	7 March 1981	
Minister of Culture	Íñigo Cavero	UCD	27 February 1981	2 December 1981	
Minister of Territorial Administration	Rodolfo Martín Villa	UCD	27 February 1981	2 December 1981	
=== Changes March 1981 ===
Portfolio	Name	Party	Took office	Left office	Ref.
Minister of Education and Science (Note: On 7 March 1981, the ministries of Education and Universities and Research were restructured and merged into the newly-established Ministry of Education and Science, whereas the Labour and Health and Social Security departments were merged into the newly-established Ministry of Labour, Health and Social Security. Concurrently, the Ministry of Transport and Communications was reorganized as the Transport, Tourism and Communications department.)	Juan Antonio Ortega y Díaz-Ambrona	UCD	7 March 1981	2 December 1981	
Minister of Labour, Health and Social Security	Jesús Sancho Rof	UCD	7 March 1981	2 December 1981	
Minister of Transport, Tourism and Communications	José Luis Álvarez	UCD	7 March 1981	2 December 1981	
~~Minister of Universities and Research~~	Disestablished on 7 March 1981.				
=== Changes May 1981 ===
Portfolio	Name	Party	Took office	Left office	Ref.
Minister of Agriculture and Fisheries (Note: On 14 May 1981, the Ministry of Agriculture was reorganized as the Ministry of Agriculture and Fisheries.)	Jaime Lamo de Espinosa	UCD	14 May 1981	2 December 1981	
=== Changes September 1981 ===
Portfolio	Name	Party	Took office	Left office	Ref.
Minister of Justice	Pío Cabanillas Gallas	UCD	1 September 1981	3 December 1982	
Minister of the Presidency	Matías Rodríguez Inciarte	UCD	1 September 1981	3 December 1982	
=== Changes December 1981 ===
Portfolio	Name	Party	Took office	Left office	Ref.
First Deputy Prime Minister (Note: On 2 December 1981, the ministries of Labour, Health and Social Security and Agriculture and Fisheries were reorganized as the ministries of Labour and Social Security and Agriculture, Fisheries and Food, respectively. Concurrently, the posts of the First and Second Deputy Prime Ministers and the Health and Consumer Affairs department were established.)	Rodolfo Martín Villa	UCD	2 December 1981	30 July 1982	
Second Deputy Prime Minister; Minister of Economy and Trade	Juan Antonio García Díez	UCD	2 December 1981	30 July 1982	
Minister of Education and Science	Federico Mayor Zaragoza	Independent	2 December 1981	3 December 1982	
Minister of Labour and Social Security	Santiago Rodríguez-Miranda	Independent	2 December 1981	3 December 1982	
Minister of Agriculture, Fisheries and Food	José Luis Álvarez	UCD	2 December 1981	13 September 1982	
Minister of Transport, Tourism and Communications	Luis Gámir	UCD	2 December 1981	3 December 1982	
Minister of Culture	Soledad Becerril	UCD	2 December 1981	3 December 1982	
Minister of Territorial Administration	Rafael Arias-Salgado	UCD	2 December 1981	30 July 1982	
Minister of Health and Consumer Affairs	Manuel Núñez Pérez	UCD	2 December 1981	3 December 1982	
Deputy Minister to the Prime Minister, without portfolio	Jaime Lamo de Espinosa	UCD	2 December 1981	30 July 1982	
=== Changes July 1982 ===
Portfolio	Name	Party	Took office	Left office	Ref.
Deputy Prime Minister for Economic Affairs (Note: Following Rodolfo Martín Villa's dismissal as First Deputy Prime Minister, the post of the Second Deputy Prime Minister was rebranded as the post of the Deputy Prime Minister for Economic Affairs.); Minister of Economy and Trade	Juan Antonio García Díez	UCD	30 July 1982	3 December 1982	
Minister of Territorial Administration	Luis Cosculluela	Independent	30 July 1982	3 December 1982	
~~Deputy Minister to the Prime Minister, without portfolio~~	Discontinued on 30 July 1982 upon the officeholder's dismissal.				
=== Changes September 1982 ===
Portfolio	Name	Party	Took office	Left office	Ref.
Minister of Agriculture, Fisheries and Food	José Luis García Ferrero	Independent	13 September 1982	3 December 1982	

== Departmental structure ==
Leopoldo Calvo-Sotelo's government was organised into several superior and governing units, whose number, powers and hierarchical structure varied depending on the ministerial department.

Unit/body rank

- (■) Secretary of state
- (■) Undersecretary
- (■) Director-general
- (●) Autonomous agency
- (◆) Military & intelligence agency

Office (Original name)	Portrait	Name	Took office	Left office	Alliance/party	Ref.
=== Prime Minister's Office ===
Prime Minister (Presidencia del Gobierno)		Leopoldo Calvo-Sotelo	26 February 1981	2 December 1982	UCD	
First Deputy Prime Minister (Vicepresidencia Primera del Gobierno) (2 December 1981 – 30 July 1982) Deputy Prime Minister for Economic Affairs (Vicepresidencia del Gobierno de Asuntos Económicos) (from 30 July 1982)		Rodolfo Martín Villa	2 December 1981	30 July 1982	UCD	
First Deputy Prime Minister (Vicepresidencia Primera del Gobierno) (2 December 1981 – 30 July 1982) Deputy Prime Minister for Economic Affairs (Vicepresidencia del Gobierno de Asuntos Económicos) (from 30 July 1982)		Juan Antonio García Díez	30 July 1982	3 December 1982	UCD	
First Deputy Prime Minister (Vicepresidencia Primera del Gobierno) (2 December 1981 – 30 July 1982) Deputy Prime Minister for Economic Affairs (Vicepresidencia del Gobierno de Asuntos Económicos) (from 30 July 1982)	30 December 1981 – 29 August 1982: (■) General Secretariat of the First Deputy Prime Minister's Office; (■) Technical Secretariat; See Ministry of Economy and Trade (30 July – 3 December 1982)					
Second Deputy Prime Minister (Vicepresidencia Segunda del Gobierno) (2 December 1981 – 30 July 1982)		Juan Antonio García Díez	2 December 1981	30 July 1982	UCD	
Second Deputy Prime Minister (Vicepresidencia Segunda del Gobierno) (2 December 1981 – 30 July 1982)	See Ministry of Economy and Trade (2 December 1981 – 30 July 1982)					
=== Ministry of Foreign Affairs ===
Ministry of Foreign Affairs (Ministerio de Asuntos Exteriores)		José Pedro Pérez-Llorca	27 February 1981	3 December 1982	UCD	
Ministry of Foreign Affairs (Ministerio de Asuntos Exteriores)	28 February 1981 – 8 December 1982: (■) State Secretariat for Foreign Affairs; (■) State Secretariat for Relations with the European Communities; (■) General Secretariat for Relations with the European Communities; (■) Deputy General Secretariat for Relations with the European Communities; (■) Technical Secretariat; (■) Undersecretariat of Foreign Affairs; (■) Technical General Secretariat; (■) Directorate-General for Foreign Policy for Europe and Atlantic Affairs; (■) Directorate-General for Foreign Policy for North America and the Pacific; (■) Directorate-General for Foreign Policy for Africa and Continental Asia; (■) Directorate-General for Foreign Policy for Ibero-America; (■) Directorate-General for the Foreign Service; (■) Directorate-General for International Economic Relations; (■) Directorate-General for Cultural Relations; (■) Directorate-General for Consular Affairs; (■) Directorate-General for International Technical Coordination; (■) Directorate-General for International Organizations and Conferences; (■) Directorate-General of the Office for Diplomatic Information; (■) Service for Protocol, Chancery and Orders–First Introducer of Ambassadors					
=== Ministry of Justice ===
Ministry of Justice (Ministerio de Justicia)		Francisco Fernández Ordóñez	27 February 1981	31 August 1981 (resigned)	UCD	
Ministry of Justice (Ministerio de Justicia)		Pío Cabanillas Gallas	1 September 1981	3 December 1982	UCD	
Ministry of Justice (Ministerio de Justicia)	7 November 1980 – 17 August 1985: (■) Undersecretariat of Justice; (■) Technical General Secretariat; (■) Technical Secretariat for Relations with the Administration of Justice; (■) Directorate-General for Religious Affairs; (■) Directorate-General for Registries and Notaries; (■) Directorate-General for Penitentiary Institutions					
=== Ministry of Defence ===
Ministry of Defence (Ministerio de Defensa)		Alberto Oliart	27 February 1981	3 December 1982	UCD	
=== Ministry of Finance ===
Ministry of Finance (Ministerio de Hacienda)		Jaime García Añoveros	27 February 1981	3 December 1982	UCD	
Ministry of Finance (Ministerio de Hacienda)	5 July 1977 – 8 December 1982: (■) Undersecretariat of Finance; (■) Undersecretariat of Budgets and Public Expenditure; (■) Directorate-General for the Treasury; (■) Directorate-General for Budgets; (■) Directorate-General for the State Heritage; (■) Directorate-General for Insurance; (■) Directorate-General for Customs; (■) Directorate-General for State Litigation; (■) Directorate-General for Taxes; (■) Directorate-General for Tax Inspection and Investigation; (■) Office of the Comptroller General of the State Administration; (■) Technical General Secretariat					
=== Ministry of the Interior ===
Ministry of the Interior (Ministerio del Interior)		Juan José Rosón	27 February 1981	3 December 1982	UCD	
=== Ministry of Public Works and Urbanism ===
Ministry of Public Works and Urbanism (Ministerio de Obras Públicas y Urbanismo)		Luis Ortiz González	27 February 1981	3 December 1982	UCD	
=== Ministry of Education and Science ===
Ministry of Education; Ministry of Universities and Research (Ministerio de Educación; Ministerio de Universidades e Investigación) (until 7 March 1981) Ministry of Education and Science (Ministerio de Educación y Ciencia) (from 7 March 1981)		Juan Antonio Ortega y Díaz-Ambrona	27 February 1981	2 December 1981	UCD	
Ministry of Education; Ministry of Universities and Research (Ministerio de Educación; Ministerio de Universidades e Investigación) (until 7 March 1981) Ministry of Education and Science (Ministerio de Educación y Ciencia) (from 7 March 1981)		Federico Mayor Zaragoza	2 December 1981	3 December 1982	UCD (Independent)	
Ministry of Education; Ministry of Universities and Research (Ministerio de Educación; Ministerio de Universidades e Investigación) (until 7 March 1981) Ministry of Education and Science (Ministerio de Educación y Ciencia) (from 7 March 1981)	28 July 1981 – 8 December 1982: (■) State Secretariat for Universities and Research; (■) Directorate-General for University Planning and Teaching Staff; (■) Directorate-General for Science Policy; (■) Undersecretariat of Education and Science (until 21 Dec 1981) / Undersecretariat for Educational Planning (from 21 Dec 1981); (■) Directorate-General for Basic Education; (■) Directorate-General for Secondary Education; (■) Undersecretariat for Educational Administration (until 21 Dec 1981) / Undersecretariat of the Ministry of Education and Science (from 21 Dec 1981); (■) Directorate-General for Personnel; (■) Directorate-General for Planning and Investments; (■) Office for Coordination and High Inspection (est. 21 Dec 1981); (■) Technical General Secretariat; (■) Chief for the High Inspection of the State (disest. 21 Dec 1981)					
=== Ministry of Labour and Social Security ===
Ministry of Labour; Ministry of Health and Social Security (Ministerio de Trabajo; Ministerio de Sanidad y Seguridad Social) (until 7 March 1981) Ministry of Labour, Health and Social Security (Ministerio de Trabajo, Sanidad y Seguridad Social) (7 March – 2 December 1981) Ministry of Labour and Social Security (Ministerio de Trabajo y Seguridad Social) (from 2 December 1981)		Jesús Sancho Rof	27 February 1981	2 December 1981	UCD	
Ministry of Labour; Ministry of Health and Social Security (Ministerio de Trabajo; Ministerio de Sanidad y Seguridad Social) (until 7 March 1981) Ministry of Labour, Health and Social Security (Ministerio de Trabajo, Sanidad y Seguridad Social) (7 March – 2 December 1981) Ministry of Labour and Social Security (Ministerio de Trabajo y Seguridad Social) (from 2 December 1981)		Santiago Rodríguez-Miranda	2 December 1981	3 December 1982	UCD (Independent)	
=== Ministry of Industry and Energy ===
Ministry of Industry and Energy (Ministerio de Industria y Energía)		Ignacio Bayón	27 February 1981	3 December 1982	UCD (Independent)	
Ministry of Industry and Energy (Ministerio de Industria y Energía)	7 October 1980 – 8 December 1982: (■) Undersecretariat of Industry and Energy; (■) Commissariat for Energy and Mineral Resources; (■) Technical General Secretariat; (■) Directorate-General for Mines; (■) Directorate-General for Energy; (■) Directorate-General for Steel and Naval Industries; (■) Directorate-General for Chemical, Textile and Pharmaceutical Industries; (■) Directorate-General for Automotive and Construction Industries; (■) Directorate-General for Electronics and Informatics; (■) Directorate-General for Food Industries and the Small and Medium-sized Industry (disest. 14 Dec 1981); (■) Directorate-General for the Small and Medium-sized Industry (est. 14 Dec 1981); (■) Directorate-General for Industrial Innovation and Technology					
=== Ministry of Agriculture ===
Ministry of Agriculture (Ministerio de Agricultura) (until 14 May 1981) Ministry of Agriculture and Fisheries (Ministerio de Agricultura y Pesca) (14 May – 2 December 1981) Ministry of Agriculture, Fisheries and Food (Ministerio de Agricultura, Pesca y Alimentación) (from 2 December 1981)		Jaime Lamo de Espinosa	27 February 1981	2 December 1981	UCD	
Ministry of Agriculture (Ministerio de Agricultura) (until 14 May 1981) Ministry of Agriculture and Fisheries (Ministerio de Agricultura y Pesca) (14 May – 2 December 1981) Ministry of Agriculture, Fisheries and Food (Ministerio de Agricultura, Pesca y Alimentación) (from 2 December 1981)		José Luis Álvarez	2 December 1981	13 September 1981	UCD	
Ministry of Agriculture (Ministerio de Agricultura) (until 14 May 1981) Ministry of Agriculture and Fisheries (Ministerio de Agricultura y Pesca) (14 May – 2 December 1981) Ministry of Agriculture, Fisheries and Food (Ministerio de Agricultura, Pesca y Alimentación) (from 2 December 1981)		José Luis García Ferrero	13 September 1982	3 December 1982	UCD (Independent)	
Ministry of Agriculture (Ministerio de Agricultura) (until 14 May 1981) Ministry of Agriculture and Fisheries (Ministerio de Agricultura y Pesca) (14 May – 2 December 1981) Ministry of Agriculture, Fisheries and Food (Ministerio de Agricultura, Pesca y Alimentación) (from 2 December 1981)	14 December 1981 – 8 December 1982: (■) State Secretariat for Food; (■) Directorate-General for Agricultural and Food Industries; (■) Directorate-General for Food Policy; (■) Undersecretariat for Agriculture and Nature Conservation; (■) Directorate-General for Agricultural Research and Training; (■) Directorate-General for Agricultural Production; (■) Directorate-General for Services; (■) Undersecretariat for Maritime Fisheries; (■) Directorate-General for Fisheries Management; (■) Directorate-General for International Fisheries Relations; (■) Technical General Secretariat					
=== Ministry of Economy and Trade ===
Ministry of Economy and Trade (Ministerio de Economía y Comercio)		Juan Antonio García Díez	27 February 1981	3 December 1982	UCD	
Ministry of Economy and Trade (Ministerio de Economía y Comercio)	7 March 1981 – 8 December 1982: (■) State Secretariat for Trade; (■) Undersecretariat of Economy; (■) Directorate-General for Economic Policy and Forecast; (■) Directorate-General for Planning; (■) Directorate-General for Financial Policy; (■) Directorate-General for the National Institute of Statistics; (■) Directorate-General for Competition and Consumer Affairs (disest. 14 Dec 1981); (■) Directorate-General for Trade Management (disest. 14 Dec 1981); (■) Directorate-General for Internal Trade (est. 14 Dec 1981); (■) Directorate-General for Coordination and Services; (■) Directorate-General for Trade Policy; (■) Directorate-General for Tariff Policy and Imports; (■) Directorate-General for Exports; (■) Directorate-General for Foreign Transactions; (■) Technical General Secretariat					
=== Ministry of the Presidency ===
Ministry of the Presidency (Ministerio de la Presidencia)		Pío Cabanillas Gallas	27 February 1981	1 September 1981	UCD	
Ministry of the Presidency (Ministerio de la Presidencia)		Matías Rodríguez Inciarte	1 September 1981	3 December 1982	UCD	
Ministry of the Presidency (Ministerio de la Presidencia)	(■) State Secretariat for Consumer Affairs (est. 21 Aug 1981); (■) Deputy Directorate-General to the Secretary of State for Consumer Affairs (est. 21 Aug 1981)					
=== Ministry of Transport and Communications ===
Ministry of Transport and Communications (Ministerio de Transportes y Comunicaciones) (until 7 March 1981) Ministry of Transport, Tourism and Communications (Ministerio de Transportes, Turismo y Comunicaciones) (from 7 March 1981)		José Luis Álvarez	27 February 1981	2 December 1981	UCD	
Ministry of Transport and Communications (Ministerio de Transportes y Comunicaciones) (until 7 March 1981) Ministry of Transport, Tourism and Communications (Ministerio de Transportes, Turismo y Comunicaciones) (from 7 March 1981)		Luis Gámir	2 December 1981	3 December 1982	UCD	
=== Ministry of Culture ===
Ministry of Culture (Ministerio de Cultura)		Íñigo Cavero	27 February 1981	2 December 1981	UCD	
Ministry of Culture (Ministerio de Cultura)		Soledad Becerril	2 December 1981	3 December 1982	UCD	
Ministry of Culture (Ministerio de Cultura)	16 March 1981 – 16 December 1982: (■) Undersecretariat of Culture; (■) Technical General Secretariat; (■) Directorate-General for Services; (■) Directorate-General for Fine Arts, Archives and Libraries; (■) Directorate-General for Book Promotion and Cinematography; (■) Directorate-General for Music and Theater; (■) Directorate-General for Youth and Sociocultural Promotion; (●) High Council for Sports; (■) President's Office of the High Council for Sports; (■) General Secretariat of the High Council for Sports; (■) Directorate for Physical Culture and Sports					
=== Ministry of Territorial Administration ===
Ministry of Territorial Administration (Ministerio de Administración; Territorial)		Rodolfo Martín Villa	27 February 1981	2 December 1981	UCD	
Ministry of Territorial Administration (Ministerio de Administración; Territorial)		Rafael Arias-Salgado	2 December 1981	30 July 1982	UCD	
Ministry of Territorial Administration (Ministerio de Administración; Territorial)		Luis Cosculluela	30 July 1982	3 December 1982	UCD (Independent)	
=== Ministry of Health and Consumer Affairs ===
Ministry of Health and Consumer Affairs (Ministerio de Sanidad y Consumo)		Manuel Núñez Pérez	2 December 1981	3 December 1982	UCD	
Ministry of Health and Consumer Affairs (Ministerio de Sanidad y Consumo)	2 December 1981 – 8 December 1982: (■) State Secretariat for Health; (■) State Secretariat for Consumer Affairs; (■) Deputy Directorate-General to the Secretary of State for Consumer Affairs; (■) Technical General Secretariat; (■) Directorate-General for Services					
=== Ministers without portfolio ===
Deputy Minister to the Prime; Minister, without portfolio (Ministro adjunto al Presidente, sin cartera) (2 December 1981 – 30 July 1982)		Jaime Lamo de Espinosa	2 December 1981	30 July 1982	UCD	
Deputy Minister to the Prime; Minister, without portfolio (Ministro adjunto al Presidente, sin cartera) (2 December 1981 – 30 July 1982)	16 January – 29 August 1982: (■) General Secretariat of the Deputy Minister to the Prime Minister's Office					

== Notes ==
Preceded by Suárez III	Government of Spain; 1981–1982	Succeeded by González I
