= Second government of Adolfo Suárez =

2nd government of Adolfo Suárez
- Government of Spain
- 1977–1979
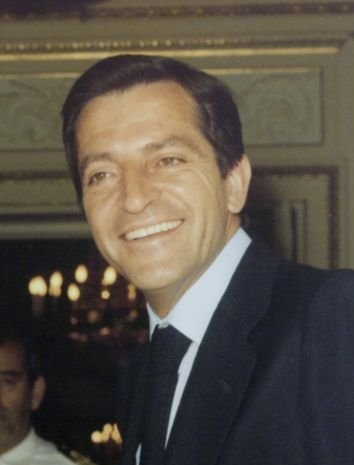
- Suárez in March 1978
- Date formed: 5 July 1977
- Date dissolved: 6 April 1979

People and organisations
- Monarch: Juan Carlos I
- Prime Minister: Adolfo Suárez
- Deputy Prime Ministers: First: Manuel Gutiérrez Mellado; Second: Enrique Fuentes Quintana (1977–1978); Fernando Abril Martorell (1978–1979); Third: Fernando Abril Martorell (1977–1978)
- No. of ministers: 19 (Note: Does not include the prime minister.) (1977; 1978); 18 (1977–1978; 1978–1979)
- Total no. of members: 24
- Member party: UCD
- Status in legislature: Minority (transitional)
- Opposition party: PSOE
- Opposition leader: Felipe González

History
- Election: 1977 general election
- Outgoing election: 1979 general election
- Legislature term: Constituent Cortes
- Budget: 1978
- Predecessor: Suárez I
- Successor: Suárez III

The second government of Adolfo Suárez was formed on 5 July 1977, following the latter's confirmation as prime minister of Spain by King Juan Carlos I on 17 June, as a result of the Union of the Democratic Centre (UCD) emerging as the largest parliamentary force at the 1977 general election. It succeeded the first Suárez government and was the government of Spain from 5 July 1977 to 6 April 1979, a total of 640 days, or 1 year, 9 months and 1 day.

Suárez's second cabinet was initially made up by independents and members from the political parties that had run within the UCD alliance, most of whom would end up joining it upon its transformation into a full-fledged political party. It was automatically dismissed on 2 March 1979 as a consequence of the 1979 general election, but remained in acting capacity until the next government was sworn in.

== Cabinet changes ==
Suárez's second government saw a number of cabinet changes during its tenure:

- On 1 September 1977, the Ministry of Culture and Welfare was renamed as Ministry of Culture, with a restructuring of the ministerial department that saw some of its competences transferred to other ministries, such as the Ministry of Foreign Affairs.
- On 27 September 1977, Ignacio Camuñas stepped down as Deputy Minister of Relations with the Cortes, without portfolio, over political discrepancies on the UCD's composition as a unitary political party. After his resignation, Camuñas's office was discontinued.
- On 11 February 1978, Leopoldo Calvo-Sotelo was appointed to the newly created post of Minister of Relations with the European Communities, without portfolio.
- On 25 February 1978, a major cabinet reshuffle resulting from the resignation of Enrique Fuentes Quintana saw Fernando Abril Martorell being reassigned as new Second Deputy Prime Minister and Minister of Economy; Manuel Jiménez de Parga was replaced as Minister of Labour by Rafael Calvo Ortega; Agustín Rodríguez Sahagún replaced Alberto Oliart in the Ministry of Industry and Energy; Jaime Lamo de Espinosa became new Minister of Agriculture in place of José Enrique Martínez Genique; and the Ministry of Transport and Communications saw the change from José Lladó to Salvador Sánchez-Terán.
- On 23 March 1979, Landelino Lavilla was elected President of the Congress of Deputies of the 1st Legislature, a position incompatible with his post as acting Minister of Justice. Rodolfo Martín Villa, acting Minister of the Interior, took on the ordinary duties of the affairs of Lavilla's vacant ministry.

== Council of Ministers ==
The Council of Ministers was structured into the offices for the prime minister, the three deputy prime ministers and 18 ministries, including a number of deputy ministers without portfolio. From February 1978, the council would only include two deputy prime ministers.

← Suárez II Government → (5 July 1977 – 6 April 1979)
Portfolio	Name	Party	Took office	Left office	Ref.
Prime Minister	Adolfo Suárez	Independent (Note: Joined the UCD in December 1977.)	17 June 1977	2 April 1979	
First Deputy Prime Minister; Minister of Defence	Manuel Gutiérrez Mellado	Military	5 July 1977	6 April 1979	
Second Deputy Prime Minister; Minister of Economy	Enrique Fuentes Quintana	Independent	5 July 1977	25 February 1978	
Third Deputy Prime Minister	Fernando Abril Martorell	Independent	5 July 1977	25 February 1978	
Minister of Foreign Affairs	Marcelino Oreja	Independent	5 July 1977	6 April 1979	
Minister of Justice	Landelino Lavilla	Independent	5 July 1977	22 March 1979	
Minister of Finance	Francisco Fernández Ordóñez	UCD^{/PSD}	5 July 1977	6 April 1979	
Minister of the Interior	Rodolfo Martín Villa	Independent	5 July 1977	6 April 1979	
Minister of Public Works and Urbanism	Joaquín Garrigues Walker	UCD^{/FPDL}	5 July 1977	6 April 1979	
Minister of Education and Science	Íñigo Cavero	UCD^{/PDC}	5 July 1977	6 April 1979	
Minister of Labour	Manuel Jiménez de Parga	Independent	5 July 1977	25 February 1978	
Minister of Industry and Energy	Alberto Oliart	Independent	5 July 1977	25 February 1978	
Minister of Agriculture	José Enrique Martínez Genique	Independent	5 July 1977	25 February 1978	
Minister of Trade and Tourism	Juan Antonio García Díez	UCD^{/PSD}	5 July 1977	6 April 1979	
Minister of the Presidency	José Manuel Otero	Independent	5 July 1977	6 April 1979	
Minister of Transport and Communications	José Lladó	Independent	5 July 1977	25 February 1978	
Minister of Health and Social Security	Enrique Sánchez de León	UCD^{/AREX}	5 July 1977	6 April 1979	
Minister of Culture and Welfare	Pío Cabanillas Gallas	UCD^{/PP}	5 July 1977	1 September 1977	
Deputy Minister for the Regions, without portfolio	Manuel Clavero	UCD^{/PSLA}	5 July 1977	6 April 1979	
Deputy Minister for Relations with the Cortes, without portfolio	Ignacio Camuñas	UCD^{/PDP}	5 July 1977	27 September 1977	
=== Changes September 1977 ===
Portfolio	Name	Party	Took office	Left office	Ref.
Minister of Culture (Note: On 1 September 1977, the Ministry of Culture and Welfare was reorganized as the Ministry of Culture.)	Pío Cabanillas Gallas	UCD^{/PP}	1 September 1977	6 April 1979	
~~Deputy Minister for Relations with the Cortes, without portfolio~~	Discontinued on 30 September 1977 upon the officeholder's dismissal.				
=== Changes February 1978 ===
Portfolio	Name	Party	Took office	Left office	Ref.
Second Deputy Prime Minister (Note: Following Enrique Fuentes Quintana's stepping down as Second Deputy Prime Minister on 25 February 1978, the Third Deputy Prime Minister was promoted to second deputy status.); Minister of Economy	Fernando Abril Martorell	UCD	25 February 1978	6 April 1979	
Minister of Labour	Rafael Calvo Ortega	UCD	25 February 1978	6 April 1979	
Minister of Industry and Energy	Agustín Rodríguez Sahagún	UCD	25 February 1978	6 April 1979	
Minister of Agriculture	Jaime Lamo de Espinosa	UCD	25 February 1978	6 April 1979	
Minister of Transport and Communications	Salvador Sánchez-Terán	UCD	25 February 1978	6 April 1979	
Minister for Relations with the European Communities, without portfolio	Leopoldo Calvo-Sotelo	UCD	11 February 1978	6 April 1979	
=== Changes 1979 ===
Portfolio	Name	Party	Took office	Left office	Ref.
Minister of Justice	Rodolfo Martín Villa took on the ordinary discharge of duties from 22 March 1979.				

== Departmental structure ==
Adolfo Suárez's second government is organised into several superior and governing units, whose number, powers and hierarchical structure may vary depending on the ministerial department.

Unit/body rank

- (■) Secretary of state
- (■) Undersecretary
- (■) Director-general
- (●) Autonomous agency
- (◆) Military & intelligence agency

Office (Original name)	Portrait	Name	Took office	Left office	Alliance/party	Ref.
=== Prime Minister's Office ===
Prime Minister (Presidencia del Gobierno)		Adolfo Suárez	17 June 1977	2 April 1979	UCD (UCD from Dec 1977; Indep. until Dec 1977)	
First Deputy Prime Minister (Vicepresidencia Primera del Gobierno)		Manuel Gutiérrez Mellado	5 July 1977	6 April 1979	UCD (Military)	
Second Deputy Prime Minister (Vicepresidencia Segunda del Gobierno)		Enrique Fuentes Quintana	5 July 1977	25 February 1978	Independent	
Second Deputy Prime Minister (Vicepresidencia Segunda del Gobierno)		Fernando Abril Martorell	25 February 1978	6 April 1979	UCD	
Third Deputy Prime Minister (Vicepresidencia Tercera del Gobierno) (until 25 February 1978)		Fernando Abril Martorell	5 July 1977	25 February 1978	UCD (UCD from Dec 1977; Indep. until Dec 1977)	
=== Ministry of Foreign Affairs ===
Ministry of Foreign Affairs (Ministerio de Asuntos Exteriores)		Marcelino Oreja	5 July 1977	6 April 1979	UCD (UCD from Dec 1977; Indep. until Dec 1977)	
=== Ministry of Justice ===
Ministry of Justice (Ministerio de Justicia)		Landelino Lavilla	5 July 1977	22 March 1979 (renounced)	UCD (UCD from Dec 1977; Indep. until Dec 1977)	
Ministry of Justice (Ministerio de Justicia)		Rodolfo Martín Villa (ordinary discharge of duties)	22 March 1979	6 April 1979	UCD	
=== Ministry of Defence ===
Ministry of Defence (Ministerio de Defensa)		Manuel Gutiérrez Mellado	5 July 1977	6 April 1979	UCD (Military)	
=== Ministry of Finance ===
Ministry of Finance (Ministerio de Hacienda)		Francisco Fernández Ordóñez	5 July 1977	6 April 1979	UCD (UCD from Dec 1977; PSD until Dec 1977)	
=== Ministry of the Interior ===
Ministry of the Interior (Ministerio del Interior)		Rodolfo Martín Villa	5 July 1977	6 April 1979	UCD (UCD from Dec 1977; Indep. until Dec 1977)	
=== Ministry of Public Works and Urbanism ===
Ministry of Public Works and Urbanism (Ministerio de Obras Públicas y Urbanismo)		Joaquín Garrigues Walker	5 July 1977	6 April 1979	UCD (UCD from Dec 1977; FPDL until Dec 1977)	
=== Ministry of Education and Science ===
Ministry of Education and Science (Ministerio de Educación y Ciencia)		Íñigo Cavero	5 July 1977	6 April 1979	UCD (UCD from Dec 1977; PDC until Dec 1977)	
=== Ministry of Labour ===
Ministry of Labour (Ministerio de Trabajo)		Manuel Jiménez de Parga	5 July 1977	25 February 1978	UCD (UCD from Dec 1977; Indep. until Dec 1977)	
Ministry of Labour (Ministerio de Trabajo)		Rafael Calvo Ortega	25 February 1978	6 April 1979	UCD	
=== Ministry of Industry and Energy ===
Ministry of Industry and Energy (Ministerio de Industria y Energía)		Alberto Oliart	5 July 1977	25 February 1978	UCD (Independent)	
Ministry of Industry and Energy (Ministerio de Industria y Energía)		Agustín Rodríguez Sahagún	25 February 1978	6 April 1979	UCD	
=== Ministry of Agriculture ===
Ministry of Agriculture (Ministerio de Agricultura)		José Enrique Martínez Genique	5 July 1977	25 February 1978	UCD (Independent)	
Ministry of Agriculture (Ministerio de Agricultura)		Jaime Lamo de Espinosa	25 February 1978	6 April 1979	UCD	
=== Ministry of Trade and Tourism ===
Ministry of Trade and Tourism (Ministerio de Comercio y Turismo)		Juan Antonio García Díez	5 July 1977	6 April 1979	UCD (UCD from Dec 1977; PSD until Dec 1977)	
=== Ministry of the Presidency ===
Ministry of the Presidency (Ministerio de la Presidencia)		José Manuel Otero	5 July 1977	6 April 1979	UCD (UCD from Dec 1977; Indep. until Dec 1977)	
=== Ministry of Economy ===
Ministry of Economy (Ministerio de Economía)		Fernando Abril Martorell	5 July 1977	6 April 1979	UCD (UCD from Dec 1977; Indep. until Dec 1977)	
=== Ministry of Transport and Communications ===
Ministry of Transport and Communications (Ministerio de Transportes y Comunicaciones)		José Lladó	5 July 1977	25 February 1978	UCD (Independent)	
Ministry of Transport and Communications (Ministerio de Transportes y Comunicaciones)		Salvador Sánchez-Terán	25 February 1978	6 April 1979	UCD	
=== Ministry of Health and Social Security ===
Ministry of Health and Social Security (Ministerio de Sanidad y Seguridad Social)		Enrique Sánchez de León	5 July 1977	6 April 1979	UCD (UCD from Dec 1977; AREX until Dec 1977)	
=== Ministry of Culture ===
Ministry of Culture and Welfare (Ministerio de Cultura y Bienestar) (until 1 September 1977) Ministry of Culture (Ministerio de Cultura) (from 1 September 1977)		Pío Cabanillas Gallas	5 July 1977	6 April 1979	UCD (UCD from Dec 1977; PP until Dec 1977)	
=== Ministers without portfolio ===
Deputy Minister for the Regions, without portfolio (Ministro adjunto para las Regiones, sin cartera)		Manuel Clavero	5 July 1977	6 April 1979	UCD (UCD from Dec 1977; PSLA until Dec 1977)	
Deputy Minister for Relations with the Cortes, without portfolio (Ministro adjunto para las Relaciones con las Cortes, sin cartera) (until 27 September 1977)		Ignacio Camuñas	5 July 1977	27 September 1977	UCD (PDP)	
Minister for Relations with the European Communities, without portfolio (Ministro para las Relaciones con las Comunidades Europeas, sin cartera) (from 11 February 1978)		Leopoldo Calvo-Sotelo	11 February 1978	6 April 1979	UCD	

== Bibliography ==
- Rodríguez Teruel, Juan (2004–2005). Los Ministros de la España democrática. Perfil, trayectorias y carrera ministerial de los miembros de Suárez a Zapatero (1976-2005) (PDF) (Thesis) (in Spanish). Autonomous University of Barcelona.

Preceded by Suárez I	Government of Spain; 1977–1979	Succeeded by Suárez III
