= Suárez Cabinet =

Suárez Cabinet may refer to:

- First Suárez Cabinet, the Spanish government led by Adolfo Suárez from 1976 to 1977
- Second Suárez Cabinet, the Spanish government led by Adolfo Suárez from 1977 to 1979
- Third Suárez Cabinet, the Spanish government led by Adolfo Suárez from 1979 to 1981
