= Government of the 1st Legislature of Spain =

Government of the 1st Legislature of Spain may refer to:

- Suárez III Government, the government of Spain during the 1st Legislature from 6 April 1979 to 27 February 1981.
- Calvo-Sotelo Government, the government of Spain during the 1st Legislature from 27 February 1981 to 18 November 1982.
