= Government of Adolfo Suárez =

Government of Adolfo Suárez may refer to:

- First government of Adolfo Suárez
- Second government of Adolfo Suárez
- Third government of Adolfo Suárez
