= Suárez government =

The term Suárez government may refer to:

- Suárez I Government, the government of Spain under Adolfo Suárez from 1976 to 1977.
- Suárez II Government, the government of Spain under Adolfo Suárez from 1977 to 1979.
- Suárez III Government, the government of Spain under Adolfo Suárez from 1979 to 1981.
