= Second Deputy Prime Minister of Spain =

Senior Member of the Spanish Government

- Vicepresidencia Segunda del Gobierno de España
- Coat of arms of Spain

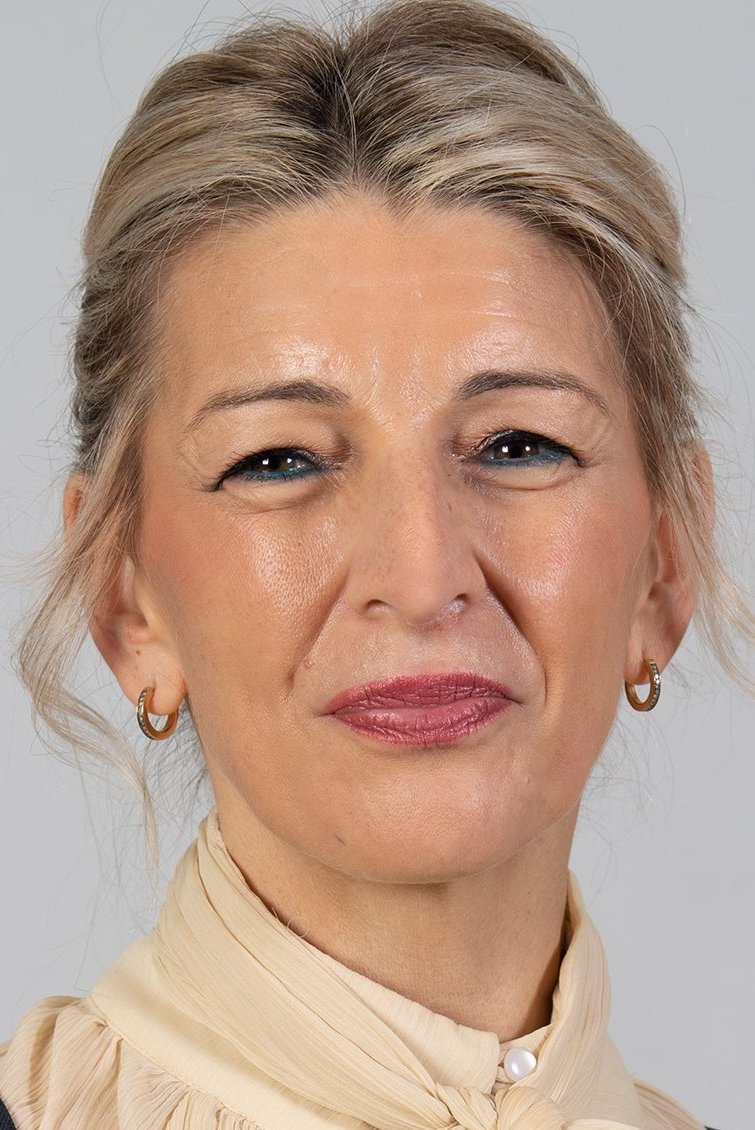
- Incumbent; Yolanda Díaz since 12 July 2021
- Government of Spain; Council of Ministers
- Style: Excelentísimo/a Señor/a
- Member of: Cabinet
- Residence: Palacio de la Moncloa
- Seat: Madrid, Spain
- Nominator: Prime Minister
- Appointer: Monarch Countersigned by the Prime Minister of Spain
- Term length: No fixed term; No term limits are imposed on the office.
- Constituting instrument: Organic Act of the State of 1967 (original); Constitution of 1978 (current)
- Formation: 3 January 1974 (52 years ago)
- First holder: Antonio Barrera de Irimo
- Deputy: Third Deputy Prime Minister of Spain

The second deputy prime minister of Spain, officially the second vice president of the Government (Spanish: Vicepresidente segundo del Gobierno), is a senior member of the Government of Spain. The office is not a permanent position, existing only at the discretion of the prime minister.

The current second deputy prime minister is Yolanda Díaz, who is also minister of Labour and Social Economy.

== History ==
The office was established by the Organic Act of the State of 1967 which allowed for the creation of a Council of Ministers composed of the Prime Minister, one or more Deputy Prime Ministers and the Ministers. However, it was not until 1974, one year after the dictator Francisco Franco split the office of head of government (prime minister) and head of state, that prime minister Arias Navarro appointed Antonio Barrera de Irimo, Minister of Finance as second deputy prime minister.

In Arias Navarro's second term, the Finance Minister Rafael Cabello de Alba was also appointed second deputy prime minister in October 1974. During his third term, Arias Navarro appointed Minister of the Interior Manuel Fraga as second deputy prime minister.

Prime minister Adolfo Suárez appointed his Interior Minister, Alfonso Osorio García and Minister of the Presidency as second deputy prime minister. From 1977 to 1981, Suárez appointed his Finance Ministers as Second Deputies and during his short term, Calvo-Sotelo did the same.

Socialist PM González never appointed a second deputy prime minister during his almost 14 years of premiership. José María Aznar and José Luis Rodríguez Zapatero however followed the previous pattern of appointing their Finance Minister as second deputy prime minister. However, a cabinet reshuffle in 2011 appointed the Minister of Territorial Policy and Civil Service, Manuel Chaves as second deputy prime minister.

The conservative PM Mariano Rajoy did not appoint a second deputy prime minister. The subsequent prime minister Pedro Sánchez did not appoint in second deputy prime minister in his first government, but he did in his second term. In March 2021, after the resignation of Pablo Iglesias as second deputy prime minister, the tradition of appointing a minister of economic affairs as second deputy PM was resumed. In July 2021, Labour and Social Economy Minister Yolanda Díaz was appointed as second deputy PM.

== Powers ==
The office of second deputy prime minister does not possess special constitutional powers beyond its responsibility as a member of the Council of Ministers. The position is regulated in the Government Act of 1997 and it only specifies that the raison d'être of the office is to replace the Prime Minister when the office is vacant, or the premier is absent or ill. The second deputy prime minister only assumes this responsibility if the first deputy is unable to fill the role.

== List of officeholders ==
Office name:

- Second Vice Presidency of the Government (1974–1975; 1977–1979; 1981–1982; 1996–2000; 2003–2011; 2020–present)
- Vice Presidency of the Government for Interior Affairs (1975–1976)
- Second Vice Presidency of the Government, in charge of the Coordination of the Economic Affairs (1979–1981)
- Second Vice Presidency of the Government for Economic Affairs (2000–2003)
- Vice Presidency of the Government for Territorial Policy (2011)

Portrait	Name (Birth–Death)	Term of office			Party	Government	Prime Minister (Tenure)	Ref.
Portrait	Name (Birth–Death)	Took office	Left office	Duration	Party	Government	Prime Minister (Tenure)	Ref.
	Antonio Barrera de Irimo (1929–2014)	4 January 1974	30 October 1974	299 days	National; Movement (Nonpartisan)	Arias Navarro I	Carlos Arias Navarro (1973–1976)	
	Rafael Cabello de Alba (1925–2010)	30 October 1974	12 December 1975	1 year and 43 days	National; Movement (Nonpartisan)	Arias Navarro I	Carlos Arias Navarro (1973–1976)	
	Manuel Fraga (1922–2012)	12 December 1975	5 July 1976	206 days	National; Movement (FEDISA)	Arias Navarro II	Carlos Arias Navarro (1973–1976)	
	Alfonso Osorio (1923–2018)	8 July 1976	5 July 1977	362 days	National; Movement (UDE)	Suárez I	Adolfo Suárez (1976–1981)	
	Enrique Fuentes Quintana (1924–2007)	5 July 1977	25 February 1978	293 days	Independent	Suárez II	Adolfo Suárez (1976–1981)	
	Fernando Abril Martorell (1936–1998)	25 February 1978	6 April 1979	2 years and 197 days	UCD	Suárez II	Adolfo Suárez (1976–1981)	
	Fernando Abril Martorell (1936–1998)	6 April 1979	9 September 1980	2 years and 197 days	UCD	Suárez III	Adolfo Suárez (1976–1981)	
	Leopoldo Calvo-Sotelo (1926–2008)	9 September 1980	27 February 1981	171 days	UCD	Suárez III	Adolfo Suárez (1976–1981)	
Office disestablished during this interval.
	Juan Antonio García Díez (1940–1998)	2 December 1981	30 July 1982	240 days	UCD	Calvo-Sotelo	Leopoldo Calvo-Sotelo (1981–1982)	
Office disestablished during this interval.
	Rodrigo Rato (born 1949)	6 May 1996	28 April 2000	7 years and 121 days	PP	Aznar I	José María Aznar (1996–2004)	
	Rodrigo Rato (born 1949)	28 April 2000	4 September 2003	7 years and 121 days	PP	Aznar II	José María Aznar (1996–2004)	
	Javier Arenas (born 1957)	4 September 2003	18 April 2004	227 days	PP	Aznar II	José María Aznar (1996–2004)	
	Pedro Solbes (1942–2023)	18 April 2004	14 April 2008	4 years and 354 days	Independent	Zapatero I	José Luis; Rodríguez Zapatero (2004–2011)	
	Pedro Solbes (1942–2023)	14 April 2008	7 April 2009	4 years and 354 days	Independent	Zapatero II	José Luis; Rodríguez Zapatero (2004–2011)	
	Elena Salgado (born 1949)	7 April 2009	12 July 2011	2 years and 96 days	Independent	Zapatero II	José Luis; Rodríguez Zapatero (2004–2011)	
	Manuel Chaves (born 1945)	12 July 2011	22 December 2011	163 days	PSOE	Zapatero II	José Luis; Rodríguez Zapatero (2004–2011)	
Office disestablished during this interval.
	Pablo Iglesias (born 1978)	13 January 2020	31 March 2021	1 year and 77 days	Podemos	Sánchez II	Pedro Sánchez (2018–present)	
	Nadia Calviño (born 1968)	31 March 2021	12 July 2021	103 days	Independent	Sánchez II	Pedro Sánchez (2018–present)	
	Yolanda Díaz (born 1971)	12 July 2021	21 November 2023	5 years and 98 days	PCE	Sánchez II	Pedro Sánchez (2018–present)	
	Yolanda Díaz (born 1971)	12 July 2021	21 November 2023	5 years and 98 days	MS, PCE	Sánchez II	Pedro Sánchez (2018–present)	
	Yolanda Díaz (born 1971)	21 November 2023	Incumbent	5 years and 98 days	MS, PCE	Sánchez III	Pedro Sánchez (2018–present)	

== See also ==
- Deputy Prime Minister of Spain
- Third Deputy Prime Minister of Spain
- Fourth Deputy Prime Minister of Spain
