= Miguel Celdrán =

Spanish politician (1940–2021)

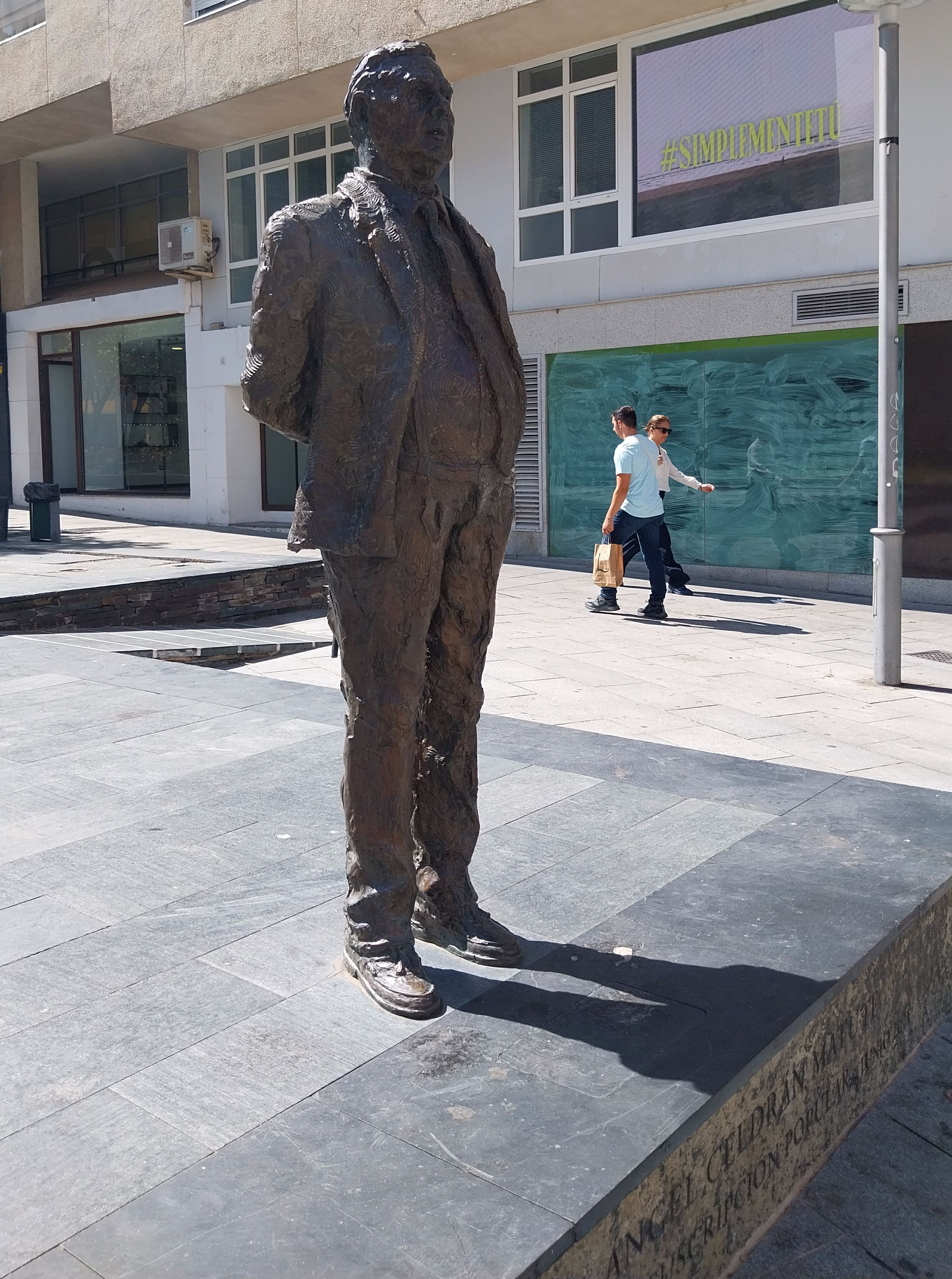
- The monument of Miguel Celdrán

Mayor of Badajoz
- In office 17 June 1995 – 4 March 2013
- Preceded by: Gabriel Montesinos
- Succeeded by: Francisco Javier Fragoso

Senator from Badajoz
- In office 2 April 2004 – 9 April 2007
- In office 27 March 2000 – 22 November 2000

Member of the Assembly of Extremadura for the Province of Badajoz
- In office 19 June 2007 – 21 June 2011

Member of the Ayuntamiento de Badajoz
- In office 4 July 1991 – 4 March 2013

Personal details
- Born: Miguel Ángel Celdrán Matute; 4 March 1940 Badajoz, Francoist Spain
- Died: 28 January 2021 (aged 80) Badajoz, Spain
- Party: PP

Miguel Ángel Celdrán Matute (4 March 1940 – 28 January 2021) was a Spanish politician. He was a member of the People's Party.

== Biography ==
Prior to his political career, Celdrán directed a driving school and served as a technical engineer for the Spanish government.

In the early 1980s, he joined the Liberal Party, led by Joaquín Garrigues Walker, which had merged with the Union of the Democratic Centre. In 1990, he joined the People's Party and was elected to the Municipal Council of Badajoz the following year. He was elected as mayor of the municipality on 26 May 1995 and was reelected in 1999, 2003, and 2007. He was then elected to the Senate of Spain to represent Badajoz, but resigned after only eight months. He regained his seat on 14 March 2004, but did not stand in the subsequent elections. On 27 May 2007, he was elected to the Assembly of Extremadura, representing the Province of Badajoz. Additionally, he served as a member of the Spanish Federation of Municipalities and Provinces.

Miguel Celdrán died in Badajoz on 28 January 2021 at the age of 80.
