= José Pedro Pérez-Llorca =

Spanish lawyer and politician (1940–2019)

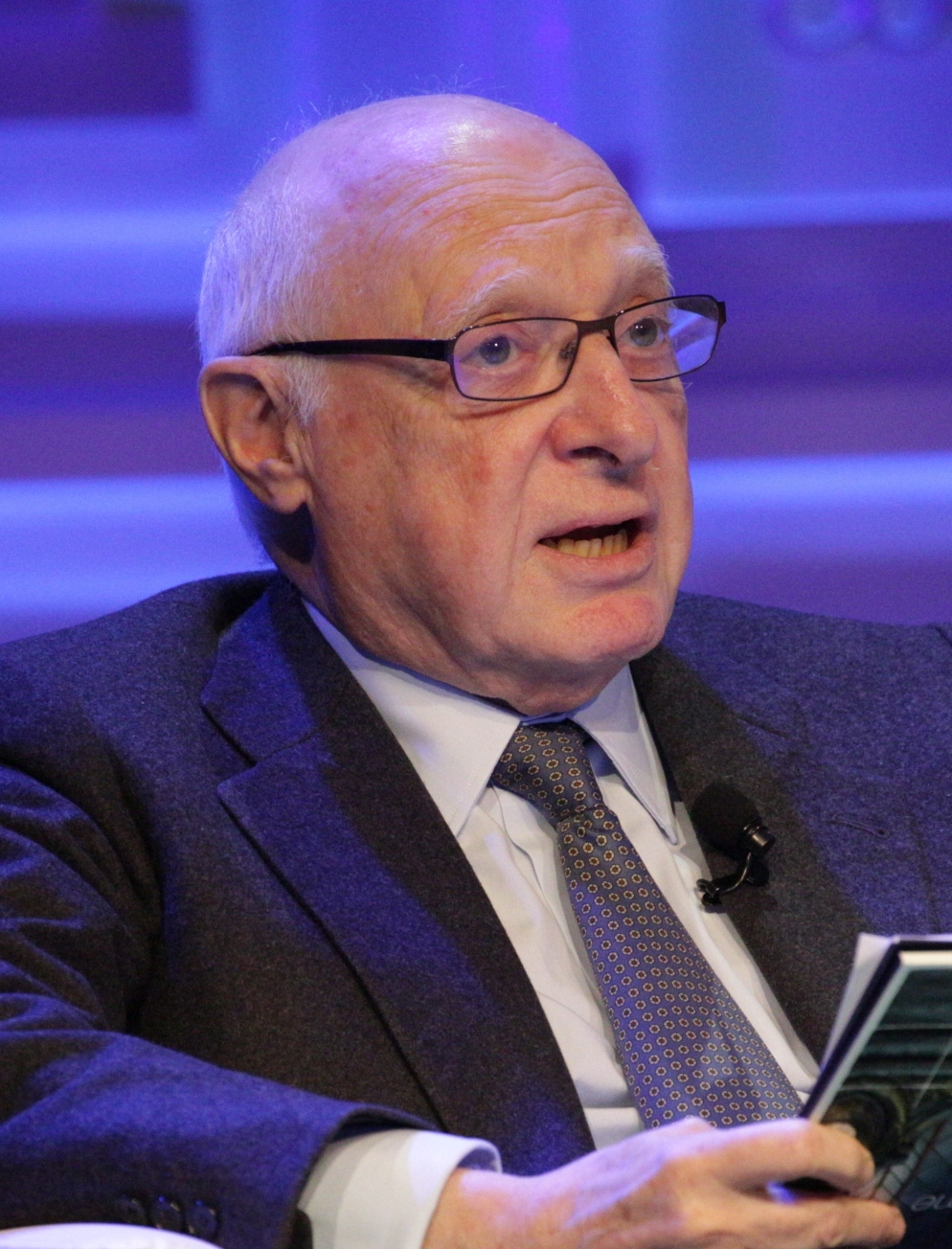

Minister of Foreign Affairs
- In office 9 September 1980 – 1 December 1982
- Prime Minister: Adolfo Suárez; Leopoldo Calvo-Sotelo
- Preceded by: Marcelino Oreja
- Succeeded by: Fernando Morán López

Minister for Territorial Administrations
- In office 3 May 1980 – 9 September 1980
- Prime Minister: Adolfo Suárez
- Preceded by: Antonio Fontán
- Succeeded by: Rodolfo Martín Villa

Minister of the Presidency Secretary of the Council of Ministers
- In office 6 April 1979 – 3 May 1980
- Prime Minister: Adolfo Suárez
- Preceded by: José Manuel Otero
- Succeeded by: Rafael Arias-Salgado

Member of the Congress of Deputies
- In office 29 June 1977 – 31 August 1982

Personal details
- Born: José Pedro Pérez-Llorca Rodrigo; 30 November 1940 Cádiz, Spain
- Died: 6 March 2019 (aged 78) Madrid, Spain
- Party: Union of the Democratic Centre
- Education: Universidad Complutense

José Pedro Pérez-Llorca Rodrigo (30 November 1940 – 6 March 2019) was a Spanish lawyer who served as the minister of foreign affairs from 1980 to 1982. His term witnessed Spain's accession to NATO and significant events in relation to the accession of Spain to the European Union. He was also one of the Fathers of the Constitution and played a key role in the country's transition to democracy.

== Early life and education ==
Pérez-Llorca was born in Cádiz on 30 November 1940. He graduated from the Universidad Complutense, Madrid, with a law degree.

== Career ==
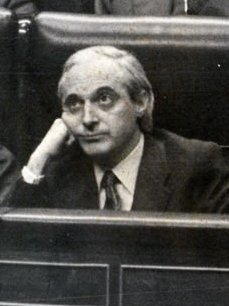
Pérez-Llorca in 1982

Pérez-Llorca was a lawyer by profession and worked in the ministry of foreign affairs. He also worked as a professor of constitutional law at his alma mater, Universidad Complutense. He played a significant role in the creation of Spain's 1978 constitution in that he was part of the seven-member commission, la Ponencia, which produced the draft constitution.

Pérez-Llorca became a member of the Union of the Democratic Centre. He served in the Congress of Deputies from 1977 to 1982, representing the province of Madrid. In 1979 he was appointed minister of the presidency and minister of territorial administration in the cabinet led by Prime Minister Adolfo Suárez.

In September 1980, Pérez-Llorca was appointed minister of foreign affairs, replacing Marcelino Oreja in the post. The cabinet was headed by Prime Minister Adolfo Suárez. Pérez-Llorca continued to serve as minister of foreign affairs in the next cabinet led by Leopoldo Calvo-Sotelo.

Pérez-Llorca's term under Adolfo Suárez was not productive due to the political tensions in the country. In his second term under Leopoldo Calvo-Sotelo the foreign policy of Spain became much closer to the Western countries. In line with this turn Pérez-Llorca focused on the Spain's relations with the European countries. On 17 November 1982 the European Parliament approved the accession of Spain to the European Communities. Another significant event during his tenure was Spain's membership to NATO in May 1982. However, Pérez-Llorca, who feared an Arab oil embargo against Spain, would also prevent Spanish President Leopoldo Calvo Sotelo's consideration to recognize Israel from going forward. His term as minister ended in December 1982.

Pérez-Llorca had several positions on the boards of different firms. He co-founded the Pérez-Llorca law firm in 1983 serving as its chairman from then until at least 2005. He was the chairman of Urquijo Leasing and AEG Ibérica and a member of the Board of Telefónica and of the Madrid Stock Exchange Council.

== Other activities ==
Pérez-Llorca was a board member of directors of the International Airlines Group. He had also membership at the non-profit organizations, including FAES Foundation and Museo Nacional del Prado.

== Death and funeral ==
Pérez-Llorca died on 6 March 2019. His funeral at the church of San Jerónimo el Real in Madrid was attended by King Felipe and Queen Letizia, and other leading figures, including Pío García-Escudero, Ana Pastor, Esperanza Aguirre, and Ana Botella.
