= Félix Manuel Pérez Miyares =

Spanish politician (1936–2024)

Minister of Labour
- In office 9 September 1980 – 27 February 1981
- Prime Minister: Adolfo Suárez
- Preceded by: Salvador Sánchez-Terán
- Succeeded by: Jesús Sancho Rof

Personal details
- Born: Félix Manuel Pérez Miyares; 4 September 1936 Nerva, Spain
- Died: 24 November 2024 (aged 88) Seville, Spain
- Party: CDS
- Other political affiliations: UCD

Félix Manuel Pérez Miyares (4 September 1936 – 24 November 2024) was a Spanish politician from the Union of the Democratic Centre (UCD) and later the Democratic and Social Centre (CDS) who served as Minister of Labour from September 1980 to February 1981. Born in Nerva, Huelva on 4 September 1936, Pérez Miyares died in Seville on 24 November 2024, at the age of 88.
