= Santiago Rodríguez-Miranda =

Spanish politician (born 1940)

Minister of Labour and Social Security
- In office 2 December 1981 – 3 December 1982
- Prime Minister: Leopoldo Calvo-Sotelo
- Preceded by: Jesús Sancho Rof
- Succeeded by: Joaquín Almunia

Personal details
- Born: Santiago Rodríguez-Miranda Gómez; 1940 (age 85–86) Palma de Mallorca, Spain
- Party: Independent
- Education: University of Barcelona

Santiago Rodríguez-Miranda Gómez (born 1940) is a Spanish politician who served as Minister of Labour and Social Security from December 1981 to December 1982.
