= Luis Cosculluela =

Spanish politician (born 1939)

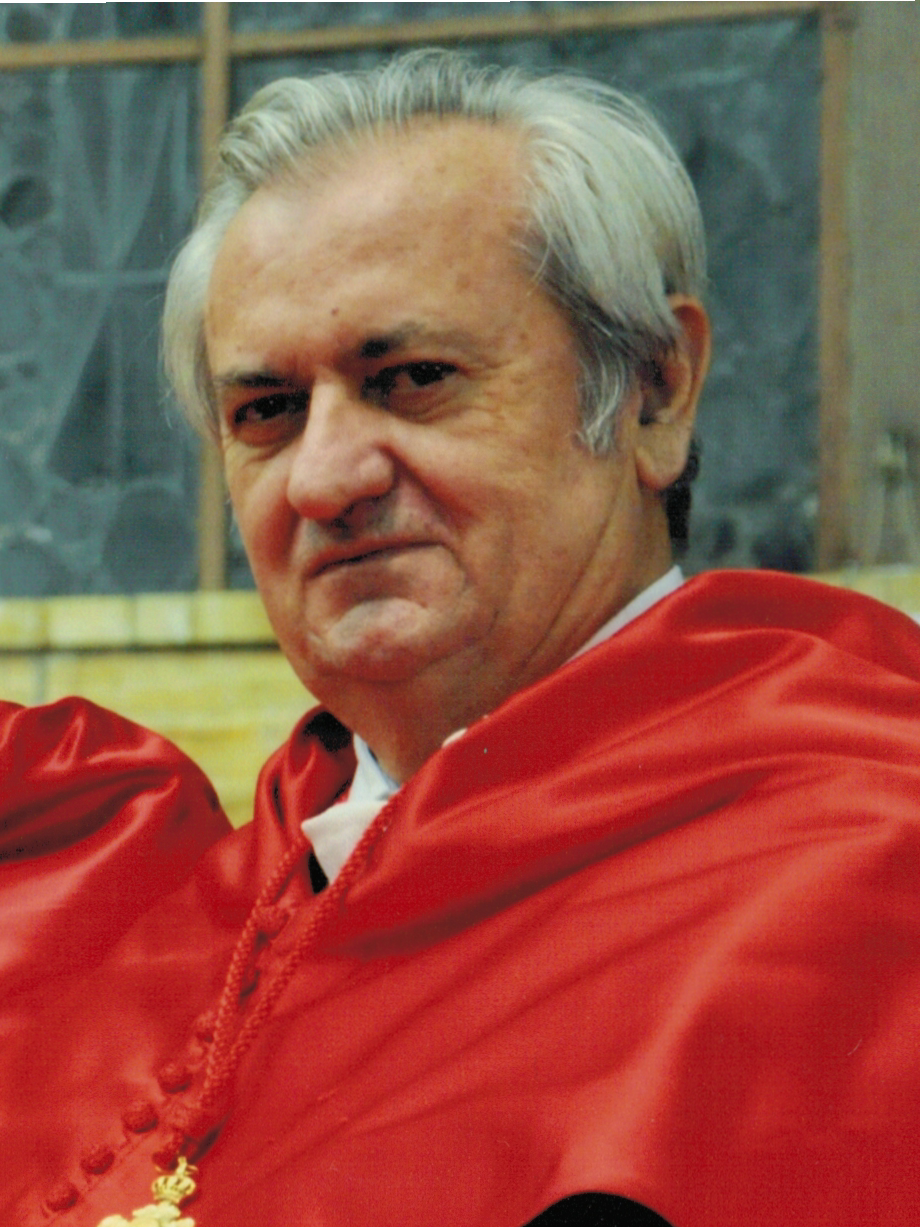
- Luís Manuel Cosculluela Montaner 2010

Minister of Territorial Administration
- In office 30 July 1982 – 3 December 1982
- Prime Minister: Leopoldo Calvo-Sotelo
- Preceded by: Rafael Arias-Salgado
- Succeeded by: Tomás de la Quadra-Salcedo

Personal details
- Born: Luis Manuel Cosculluela Montaner; 23 September 1939 (age 86) Barbastro, Huesca, Spain
- Party: Independent
- Education: University of Barcelona

Luis Cosculluela (born 23 September 1939) is a Spanish politician who served as Minister of Territorial Administration from July to December 1982.
