= Ignacio Bayón =

Spanish politician (1944–2024)

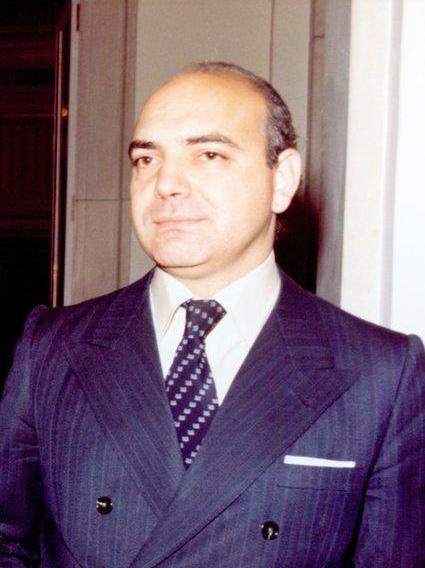
- Bayón in 1981

Minister of Industry and Energy
- In office 3 May 1980 – 3 December 1982
- Prime Minister: Adolfo Suárez; Leopoldo Calvo-Sotelo
- Preceded by: Carlos Bustelo
- Succeeded by: Carlos Solchaga

Personal details
- Born: Ignacio Bayón Mariné; 14 February 1944 Madrid, Spain
- Died: 4 May 2024 (aged 80)
- Party: Independent
- Education: Complutense University of Madrid

Ignacio Bayón Mariné (14 February 1944 – 4 May 2024) was a Spanish politician who served as Minister of Industry and Energy from May 1980 to December 1982. Bayón died on 4 May 2024, at the age of 80.
