= Sebastián Martín-Retortillo =

Spanish politician

Deputy Minister to the Prime Minister, Responsible for Public Administration
- In office 3 May 1980 – 27 February 1981
- Prime Minister: Adolfo Suárez
- Preceded by: Office established
- Succeeded by: Office disestablished

Personal details
- Born: Sebastián Ricardo Martín-Retortillo Baquer; 7 February 1931 Huesca, Spain
- Died: 19 October 2002 (aged 71) Madrid, Spain
- Party: UCD
- Education: University of Zaragoza; University of Bologna

Sebastián Ricardo Martín-Retortillo Baquer (7 February 1931 – 19 October 2002) was a Spanish politician from the Union of the Democratic Centre (UCD) who served as Deputy Minister to the Prime Minister, Responsible for Public Administration from May 1980 to February 1981.
