= José Luis Leal =

Spanish politician (born 1939)

Minister of Economy
- In office 6 April 1979 – 9 September 1980
- Prime Minister: Adolfo Suárez
- Preceded by: Office established
- Succeeded by: Juan Antonio García Díez

Personal details
- Born: José Luis Leal Maldonado; 1939 (age 86–87) Granada, Spain
- Party: UCD
- Education: Complutense University of Madrid

José Luis Leal Maldonado (born 1939) is a Spanish politician from the Union of the Democratic Centre (UCD) who served as Minister of Economy from April 1979 to September 1980.
