= Juan Antonio Ortega y Díaz-Ambrona =

Spanish politician

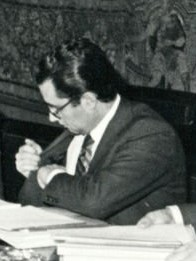

Minister of Education and Science
- In office 27 February 1981 – 2 December 1981
- Prime Minister: Leopoldo Calvo-Sotelo
- Preceded by: Himself
- Succeeded by: Federico Mayor Zaragoza

Minister of Education
- In office 9 September 1980 – 27 February 1981
- Prime Minister: Adolfo Suárez
- Preceded by: José Manuel Otero
- Succeeded by: Himself

Deputy Minister to the Prime Minister, Responsible for Legislative Coordination
- In office 3 May 1980 – 9 September 1980
- Prime Minister: Adolfo Suárez
- Preceded by: Office established
- Succeeded by: Office disestablished

Personal details
- Born: Juan Antonio Ortega y Díaz-Ambrona; 11 December 1939 (age 86) Madrid, Spain
- Party: UCD
- Education: Complutense University of Madrid

Juan Antonio Ortega y Díaz-Ambrona (born 11 December 1939) is a Spanish politician from the Union of the Democratic Centre (UCD) who served as Minister of Education from September 1980 to December 1981.
