= Joaquín Garrigues Walker =

Spanish politician (1933–1980)

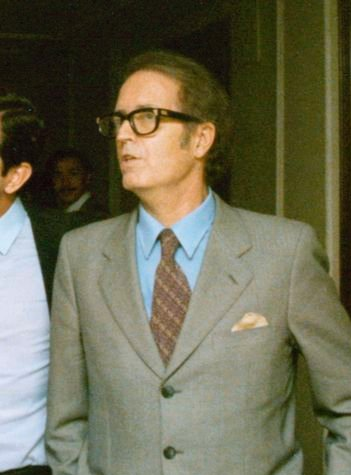

Deputy Minister to the Prime Minister, without portfolio
- In office 6 April 1979 – 3 May 1980
- Prime Minister: Adolfo Suárez
- Preceded by: Office established
- Succeeded by: Office disestablished

Minister of Public Works and Urbanism
- In office 5 July 1977 – 6 April 1979
- Prime Minister: Adolfo Suárez
- Preceded by: Luis Ortiz González
- Succeeded by: Jesús Sancho Rof

Personal details
- Born: Joaquín Garrigues Walker; 30 September 1933 Madrid, Spain
- Died: 28 July 1980 Madrid, Spain
- Party: UCD
- Other political affiliations: FPDL
- Education: Complutense University of Madrid

Joaquín Garrigues Walker (30 September 1933 – 28 July 1980) was a Spanish politician from the Union of the Democratic Centre (UCD) who served as Deputy Minister to the Prime Minister, without portfolio from April 1979 to May 1980 and previously as Minister of Public Works and Urbanism from July 1977 to April 1979.
