= Ministry of Transport (Spain) =

- Ministerio de Transportes

Agency overview
- Formed: July 4, 1977 (as Ministry of Transport and Communications); March 6, 1981 (as Ministry of Transport, Tourism and Communications)
- Preceding agencies: Ministry of Home Affairs (postal service and communications); Ministry of Public Works (land transport); Ministry of Trade (merchant marine, fisheries and tourism); Ministry of the Air (civil aviation)
- Dissolved: March 13, 1991
- Superseding agencies: Ministry of Public Works and Transport (transports and communications); Ministry of Industry, Tourism and Trade (tourism); Ministry of Agriculture (fisheries)
- Type: Ministry
- Jurisdiction: Government of Spain

The Ministry of Transport was a department of the Government of Spain which existed between 1977 and 1991. The department was originally named Ministry of Transport and Communications and it was endowed with powers over the postal, telegraphic, radiotelegraphic, telephone and radiotelephone services, the management of all kind of transports (land, air and maritime) and fishery. The fishery powers were transferred to the Ministry of Agriculture in 1980 and the same year the Secretariat of State for Tourism was added to the Ministry. For this reason, the department was renamed Ministry of Transport, Tourism and Communications the following year until its dissolution in 1991.

The Department of Transport was suppressed in March 1991 and most of its competences returned to the Ministry of Public Works. From 1977 to 1991, seven people served as Ministers of Transport.

== Organization chart ==
=== First period (1977–1981) ===
During the first period, the Transport Ministry was integrated by the following bodies:

- The Directorate-General for the Postal Service and Telecommunications.
- The Government Delegation in the National Telephone Company of Spain.
- The Directorate-General for Land Transportation.
- The Undersecretariat for Fisheries and Merchant Marine.
- The Undersecretariat for Civil Aviation.
- The Undersecretariat of Transport and Communications.
- The Technical General Secretariat.

=== Second period (1981–1991) ===
During its second period, the ministry maintained its structure but with some modifications:

- The General Secretariat for Tourism, which was added in 1980.
- The Undersecretariat of Transport and Telecommunications was renamed Undersecretariat of Transport, Tourism and Communications since 1981.

== List of officeholders ==
Office name:

- Ministry of Transport and Communications (1977–1981)
- Ministry of Transport, Tourism and Communications (1981–1991)

Portrait	Name (Birth–Death)	Term of office			Party	Government		Ref.
Portrait	Name (Birth–Death)	Took office	Left office	Duration	Party	Government		Ref.
	José Lladó (1934–2024)	4 July 1977	24 February 1978	235 days	Centrist	Adolfo Suárez (1976–1981)	Juan Carlos I (1975–2014)	
	Salvador Sánchez-Terán (1934–2022)	24 February 1978	2 May 1980	2 years and 68 days	Centrist	Adolfo Suárez (1976–1981)	Juan Carlos I (1975–2014)	
	José Luis Álvarez y Álvarez (1930–2023)	2 May 1980	1 December 1981	1 year and 213 days	Centrist	Adolfo Suárez (1976–1981)	Juan Carlos I (1975–2014)	
	José Luis Álvarez y Álvarez (1930–2023)	2 May 1980	1 December 1981	1 year and 213 days	Centrist	Leopoldo Calvo-Sotelo (1981–1982)	Juan Carlos I (1975–2014)	
	Luis Gámir (1942–2017)	1 December 1981	2 December 1982	1 year and 1 day	Centrist	Leopoldo Calvo-Sotelo (1981–1982)	Juan Carlos I (1975–2014)	
	Enrique Barón (born 1944)	2 December 1982	4 July 1985	2 years and 214 days	Socialist	Felipe González (1982–1996)	Juan Carlos I (1975–2014)	
	Abel Caballero (born 1946)	4 July 1985	11 July 1988	3 years and 7 days	Socialist	Felipe González (1982–1996)	Juan Carlos I (1975–2014)	
	José Barrionuevo (born 1942)	11 July 1988	12 March 1991	2 years and 244 days	Socialist	Felipe González (1982–1996)	Juan Carlos I (1975–2014)	
