= Ministry of Territorial Policy =

Government ministry of Spain

Ministry of Territorial Policy and Democratic Memory
- Ministerio de Política Territorial y Memoria Democrática

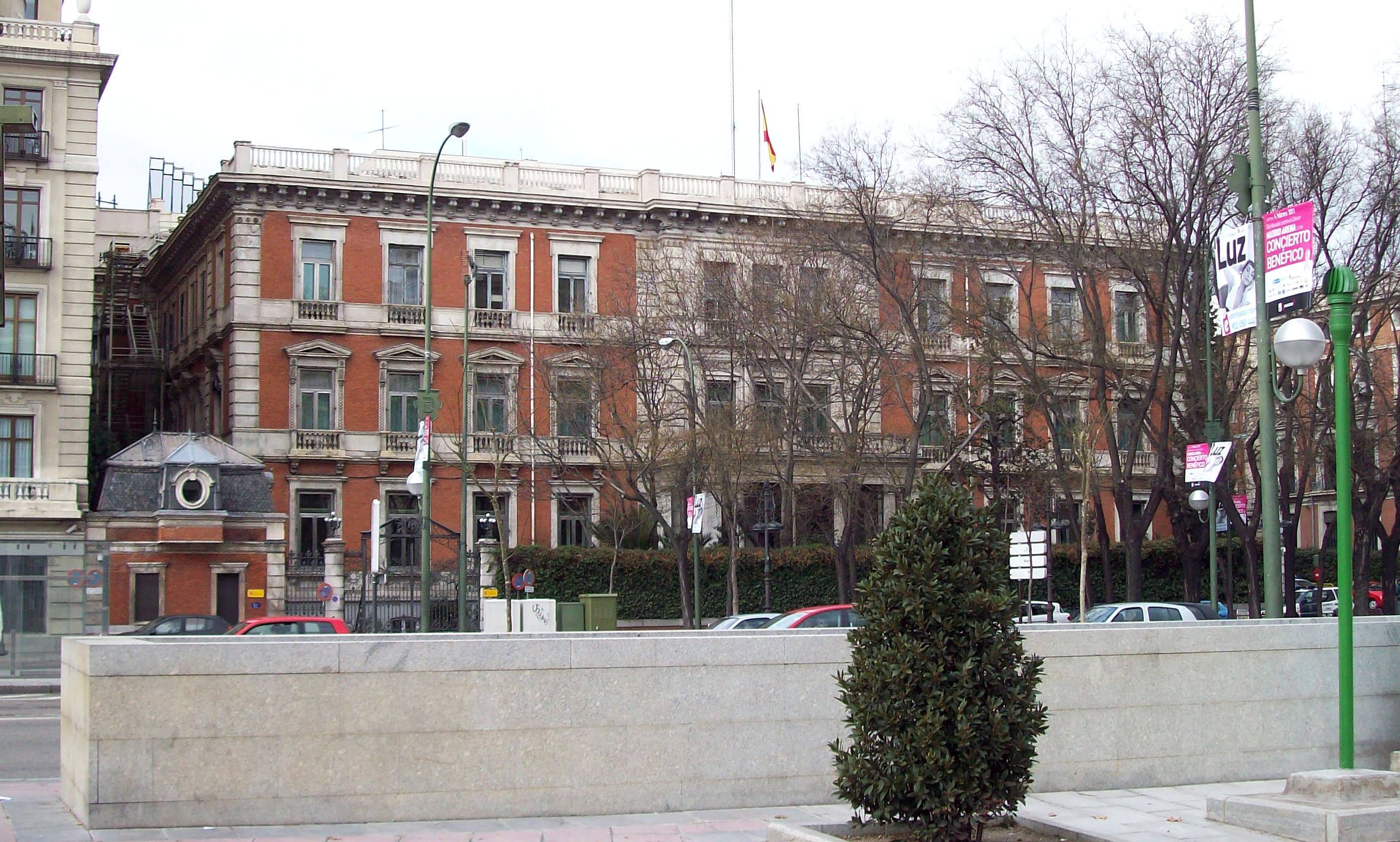
- Palace of Villamejor, headquarters of the Ministry

Agency overview
- Formed: April 5, 1979; 47 years ago (as Ministry for Territorial Administration)
- Preceding agencies: Ministry of the Interior; Deputy Minister for the Regions
- Type: Ministry
- Jurisdiction: Government of Spain
- Headquarters: Palace of Villamejor, Madrid
- Annual budget: € 411 million, 2026
- Minister responsible: Ángel Víctor Torres, Minister
- Agency executives: Miryam Álvarez Páez, Secretary of State for Territorial Policy; Fernando Martínez López, Secretary of State for Democratic Memory; Berta Pérez Hernández, Under-Secretary
- Website: www.mptmd.gob.es(in Spanish)

The Ministry of Territorial Policy and Democratic Memory (MPTMD) is the department of the Government of Spain responsible for designing and implementing government policy in the field of regional policy. In this role, it manages relations between the central government and regional and local governments, and coordinates the activity of the General State Administration throughout the country, primarily through Government Delegations and Sub-delegations. It is also responsible for designing and proposing government policy on historical and democratic memory.

However, it is not responsible for managing financial relations with the various public administrations, as this responsibility falls under the jurisdiction of the Ministry of Finance, through the General Secretariat for Regional and Local Financing.

It was the first ministry created after the approval of the 1978 Constitution, with the aim of fulfilling the central government's responsibilities arising from the new territorial organization of the country established by the Constitution. Since 1980, its headquarters have been located at 3 Paseo de la Castellana in Madrid, in a building known as the Palace of the Marquess of Villamejor.

== History ==
This Ministry was first created in 1979 after the approval of the Constitution of 1978 in order to adapt the centralized administration to the new decentralized territorial administration. At the beginning, it assumed the relations with the already formed regions, the regions in process of formation and the local administration.

Previously, between 1977 and 1979 there was the figure of the Assistant Ministry of the Regions which, led by Manuel Clavero, developed the pre-autonomy agreements of the various regions and nationalities of Spain.

Initially it was endowed with a small structure, composed of a Undersecretariat, a Technical General Secretariat and two Directorates-General: Cooperation with Autonomous Regimes and Local Cooperation, this last transferred from the Ministry of the Interior.

In the words of Prime Minister Adolfo Suárez before the Congress of Deputies on 18 April 1979:

The Deputy Minister for the Regions has been removed in order to create from the Ministry of the Interior a new Ministry for Territorial Administration of the State that has clear and specific competences, completely absent from any other relationship with matters of public order in the relations with the City Councils, in the relations with the Provincial Councils and in the relations with the Autonomous Communities, from the perspective of the constitutional mandate of the autonomies that correspond to each one of these

— Adolfo Suárez, 18 April 1979

One year later, and with the aim of strengthening the administrative structures that facilitated the process of devolution to the Autonomous Communities, the Secretary of State for the Autonomous Communities, the Secretary of State for Local Corporations and the Directorate-General for Autonomic Development were created.

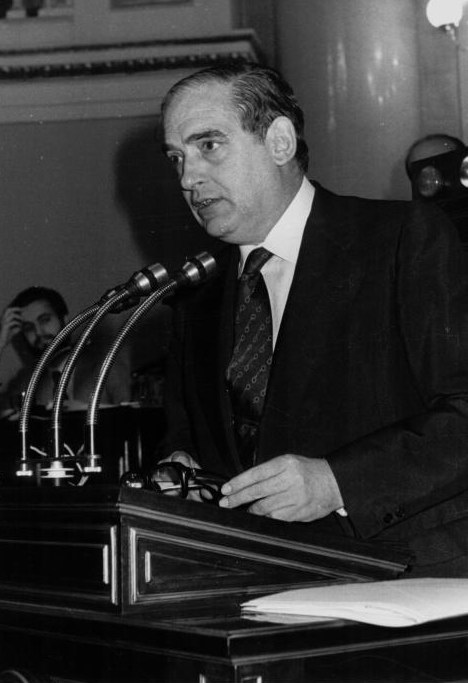
Antonio Fontán, first Minister for Territorial Administration.

After the arrival of the Socialist Workers' Party to the Government, in 1983 the Ministry was again the object of remodeling. The Secretary of State for Local Corporations disappeared and four Directorates-General were established: Autonomic Development; Cooperation with the Autonomous Communities; Local Management; and Local Cooperation.

The great reshuffle took place, nevertheless, in 1986, when the department was renamed «for the Public Administrations» and receives powers on Civil Service and Administrative Modernization that until that moment exerted the Ministry of the Presidency.

A new extension of powers took place in 1997, as a consequence of the approval of the Law 6/1997, of April 14, of Organization and Functioning of the General State Administration, which organically assigned to it the Government Delegations (until then dependents from Interior).

These three areas of activity (Relationship with Autonomous and Local Administrations, Civil Service, and coordination of the Government Delegations) have remained as the competence axis of the department, except for the period 2009–2010, in which the last two passed temporarily to the Ministry of the Presidency. These three areas of work (Relations with Autonomous and Local Administrations, Civil Service, and coordination of the Government Delegations) have remained as the responsibilities axis of the department, except for the period 2009–2010, in which the last two passed temporarily to the Ministry of the Presidency.

Since December 22, 2011, the powers of this department have been integrated in the Ministry of the Treasury, which was renamed the Ministry of the Treasury and Public Administration. All its functions were assigned to the Secretary of State for Public Administrations. In 2016, the functions of relations with the regions and local administrations were transferred to the Presidency Ministry and it wasn't until 2018 that this Ministry was recovered assuming all of its historic responsibilities.

== Organization ==
Organizational chart of the Spanish Ministry of Territorial Policy, March 2024

The minister of territorial policy and democratic memory is the most senior official of the department. The ministers manages two main policies: government relations with other administrations and democratic memory, concerning the legacy of the dictatorship of Francisco Franco.

To implement this policies, the minister is assisted by two secretaries of state and an under-secretary, who manages the ministry on a day-to-day basis. In addition, three commissioners, with the rank of under-secretaries, assist the minister in specific matters related to natural disasters and democratic memory.

As of 2026, this is the organization of the Ministry:

Ministry Organization (2026)
Minister	Cabinet (Chief of Staff)
Minister	Special Commissioner for the Reconstruction of the island of La Palma
Minister	Special Commissioner for the Reconstruction and Repair of damage caused by the 2024 Spanish floods
Minister	Commissioner for the celebration of the 50 years of Spain in Freedom
Secretary of State for Territorial Policy	General Secretariat for Territorial Coordination
Secretary of State for Territorial Policy	Directorate-General for Regional and Local Cooperation
Secretary of State for Territorial Policy	Directorate-General for Regional and Local Legal Framework
Secretary of State for Territorial Policy	Directorate-General for the General State Administration in the Territory
Secretary of State for Territorial Policy	Deputy Directorate-General for European and International Affairs
Secretary of State for Democratic Memory	Directorate-General for Victims Assistance
Secretary of State for Democratic Memory	Directorate-General for Democratic Memory Promotion
Under-Secretary	Technical General Secretariat
Under-Secretary	Deputy Directorate-General for the Budget Office and Economic Management
Under-Secretary	Deputy Directorate-General for Human Resources and Inspection of Services
Under-Secretary	Administrative Office

== Budget ==
In millions of euros (€)
1. Territorial State Administration 285.86 (69.5%)
2. Economic Cooperation 58.44 (14.2%)
3. Central Services 41.4 (10.1%)
4. Democratic Memory 13.95 (3.39%)
5. State Organization and Cooperation Systems 11.76 (2.86%)

For fiscal year 2026, the Ministry of Territorial Policy and Democratic Memory has a consolidated budget of €411.4 million.

The budget is divided in five programs:

1. Central Services (Program 921M), which covers the costs of the internal structure and administrative functioning of the department.
2. General State Administration in the Territory (921P), which funds the peripheral structure that enables the presence and coordination of the Government across all regions and local entities.
3. State Organization and Cooperation Systems (922M), which allocates resources to institutional coordination between the central government, the regions, and local entities.
4. Democratic Memory (925M), which provides funding for the implementation of the measures set out in the Democratic Memory Law.
5. Economic Cooperation (942A), an economic instrument through which the central government provides financial support to and strengthens local entities, ensuring their capacity to provide public services.

== List of officeholders ==
Office name:

- Ministry of Territorial Administration (1979–1986)
- Ministry for Public Administrations (1986–2009)
- Ministry of Territorial Policy (2009–2010; 2021–2023)
- Ministry of Territorial Policy and Public Administrations (2010–2011)
- Ministry of Territorial Policy and Civil Service (2016–2021)
- Ministry of Territorial Policy and Democratic Memory (2023–present)

Portrait	Name (Birth–Death)	Term of office			Party	Government	Prime Minister (Tenure)	Ref.
Portrait	Name (Birth–Death)	Took office	Left office	Duration	Party	Government	Prime Minister (Tenure)	Ref.
	Antonio Fontán (1923–2010)	6 April 1979	3 May 1980	1 year and 27 days	UCD	Suárez III	Adolfo Suárez (1976–1981)	
	José Pedro Pérez-Llorca (1940–2019)	3 May 1980	9 September 1980	129 days	UCD	Suárez III	Adolfo Suárez (1976–1981)	
	Rodolfo Martín Villa (born 1934)	9 September 1980	27 February 1981	1 year and 84 days	UCD	Suárez III	Adolfo Suárez (1976–1981)	
	Rodolfo Martín Villa (born 1934)	27 February 1981	2 December 1981	1 year and 84 days	UCD	Calvo-Sotelo	Leopoldo Calvo-Sotelo (1981–1982)	
	Rafael Arias-Salgado (born 1942)	2 December 1981	30 July 1982	240 days	UCD	Calvo-Sotelo	Leopoldo Calvo-Sotelo (1981–1982)	
	Luis Cosculluela (born 1939)	30 July 1982	3 December 1982	126 days	Independent	Calvo-Sotelo	Leopoldo Calvo-Sotelo (1981–1982)	
	Tomás de la Quadra-Salcedo (born 1946)	3 December 1982	5 July 1985	2 years and 214 days	PSOE	González I	Felipe González (1982–1996)	
	Félix Pons (1942–2010)	5 July 1985	14 July 1986 (renounced)	1 year and 9 days	PSOE	González I	Felipe González (1982–1996)	
	Javier Moscoso (ordinary discharge of duties) (born 1934)	14 July 1986	26 July 1986	12 days	Independent	González I	Felipe González (1982–1996)	
	Joaquín Almunia (born 1948)	26 July 1986	7 December 1989	4 years and 230 days	PSOE	González II	Felipe González (1982–1996)	
	Joaquín Almunia (born 1948)	7 December 1989	13 March 1991	4 years and 230 days	PSOE	González III	Felipe González (1982–1996)	
	Juan Manuel Eguiagaray (1945–2025)	13 March 1991	14 July 1993	2 years and 123 days	PSOE	González III	Felipe González (1982–1996)	
	Jerónimo Saavedra (1936–2023)	14 July 1993	3 July 1995	1 year and 354 days	PSOE	González IV	Felipe González (1982–1996)	
	Joan Lerma (born 1951)	3 July 1995	6 May 1996	308 days	PSOE	González IV	Felipe González (1982–1996)	
	Mariano Rajoy (born 1955)	6 May 1996	19 January 1999	2 years and 258 days	PP	Aznar I	José María Aznar (1996–2004)	
	Ángel Acebes (born 1958)	19 January 1999	28 April 2000	1 year and 100 days	PP	Aznar I	José María Aznar (1996–2004)	
	Jesús Posada (born 1945)	28 April 2000	10 July 2002	2 years and 73 days	PP	Aznar II	José María Aznar (1996–2004)	
	Javier Arenas (born 1957)	10 July 2002	4 September 2003	1 year and 56 days	PP	Aznar II	José María Aznar (1996–2004)	
	Julia García-Valdecasas (1944–2009)	4 September 2003	18 April 2004	227 days	PP	Aznar II	José María Aznar (1996–2004)	
	Jordi Sevilla (born 1956)	18 April 2004	9 July 2007	3 years and 82 days	PSOE	Zapatero I	José Luis; Rodríguez Zapatero (2004–2011)	
	Elena Salgado (born 1949)	9 July 2007	14 April 2008	1 year and 272 days	Independent	Zapatero I	José Luis; Rodríguez Zapatero (2004–2011)	
	Elena Salgado (born 1949)	14 April 2008	7 April 2009	1 year and 272 days	Independent	Zapatero II	José Luis; Rodríguez Zapatero (2004–2011)	
	Manuel Chaves (born 1945)	7 April 2009	22 December 2011	2 years and 259 days	PSOE	Zapatero II	José Luis; Rodríguez Zapatero (2004–2011)	
Office disestablished during this interval. (Note: The department's competences were transferred to the Ministry of Finance and Ministry of the Presidency between 2011 and 2016.)
	Meritxell Batet (born 1973)	7 June 2018	20 May 2019 (renounced)	347 days	PSC–PSOE	Sánchez I	Pedro Sánchez (2018–present)	
	Luis Planas (ordinary discharge of duties) (born 1952)	20 May 2019	13 January 2020	238 days	PSOE	Sánchez I	Pedro Sánchez (2018–present)	
	Carolina Darias (born 1965)	13 January 2020	27 January 2021	1 year and 14 days	PSOE	Sánchez II	Pedro Sánchez (2018–present)	
	Miquel Iceta (born 1960)	27 January 2021	12 July 2021	166 days	PSC–PSOE	Sánchez II	Pedro Sánchez (2018–present)	
	Isabel Rodríguez (born 1981)	12 July 2021	21 November 2023	2 years and 132 days	PSOE	Sánchez II	Pedro Sánchez (2018–present)	
	Ángel Víctor Torres (born 1966)	21 November 2023	Incumbent	2 years and 261 days	PSOE	Sánchez III	Pedro Sánchez (2018–present)	
