= Salvador Sánchez-Terán =

Spanish politician (1934–2022)

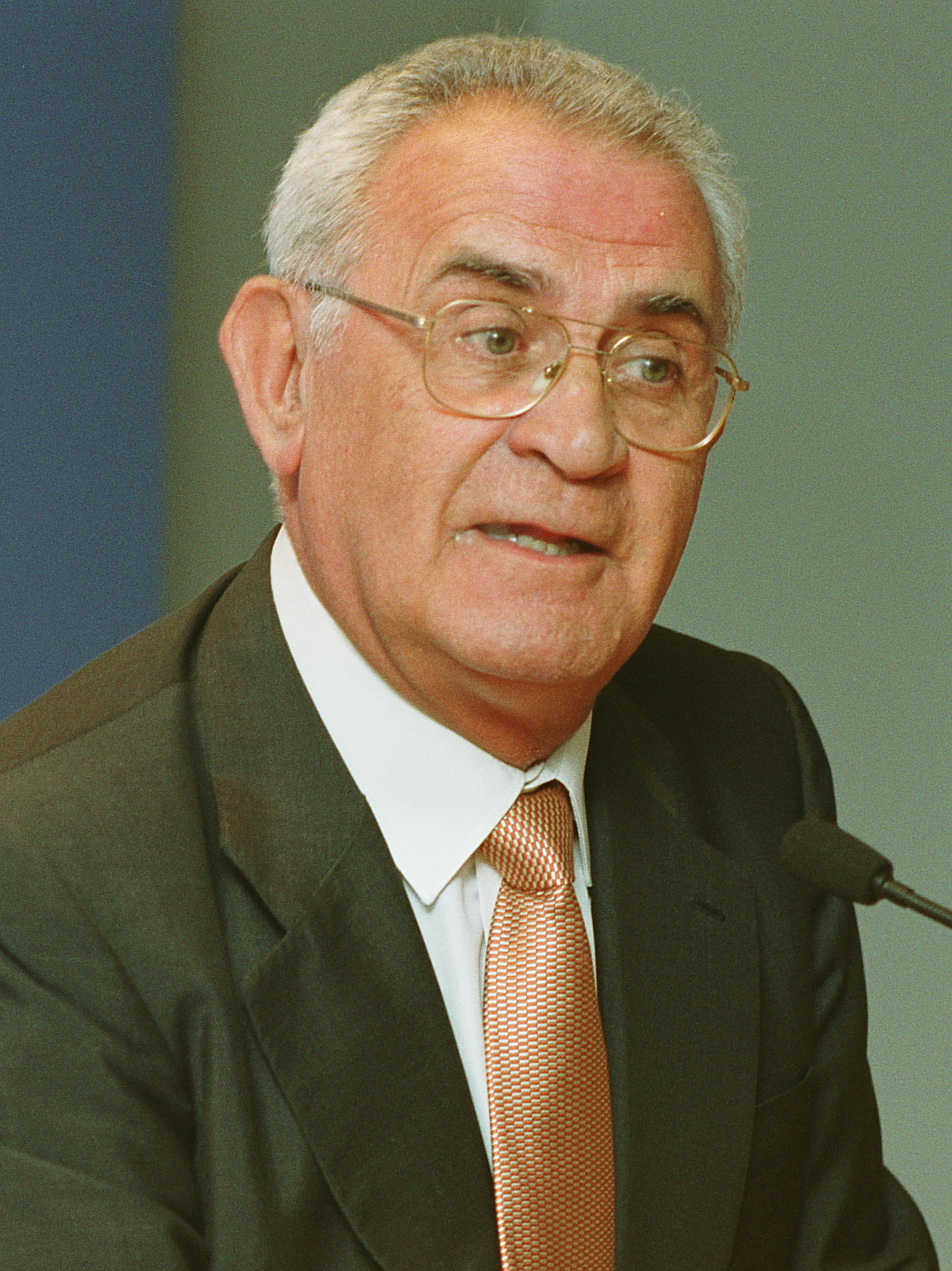
- Sánchez-Terán in 2001

Minister of Labour
- In office 3 May 1980 – 9 September 1980
- Prime Minister: Adolfo Suárez
- Preceded by: Rafael Calvo Ortega
- Succeeded by: Félix Manuel Pérez Miyares

Minister of Transport and Communications
- In office 25 February 1978 – 3 May 1980
- Prime Minister: Adolfo Suárez
- Preceded by: José Lladó
- Succeeded by: José Luis Álvarez

Personal details
- Born: Salvador Sánchez-Terán Hernández; 19 April 1934 Logroño, Spain
- Died: 31 December 2022 (aged 88) Ciudad Rodrigo, Spain
- Party: UCD

Salvador Sánchez-Terán Hernández (19 April 1934 – 31 December 2022) was a Spanish politician from the Union of the Democratic Centre (UCD) who served as Minister of Labour from May to September 1980 and previously as Minister of Transport and Communications from February 1978 to May 1980.

Sánchez-Terán died on 31 December 2022, at the age of 88.
