= Rafael Calvo Ortega =

Spanish politician (1933–2025)

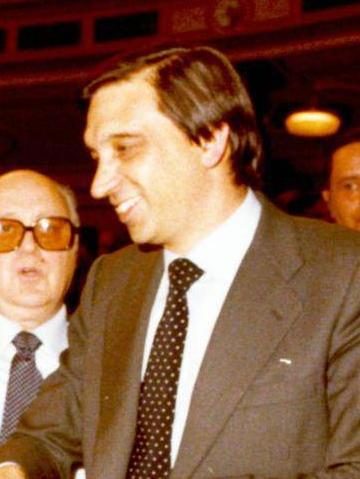

Minister of Labour
- In office 25 February 1978 – 3 May 1980
- Prime Minister: Adolfo Suárez
- Preceded by: Manuel Jiménez de Parga
- Succeeded by: Salvador Sánchez-Terán

Personal details
- Born: Rafael Calvo Ortega; 26 August 1933 El Espinar, Segovia, Spain
- Died: 27 October 2025 (aged 92) Madrid
- Party: CDS
- Other political affiliations: UCD (1978–82)
- Education: University of Salamanca; University of Bologna

Rafael Calvo Ortega (26 August 1933 – 27 October 2025) was a Spanish politician who served as Minister of Labour from February 1978 to May 1980. He was also secretary-general of the Union of the Democratic Centre (UCD) in 1981 and president of the Democratic and Social Centre (CDS) between 1991 and 1998.

He was constituent senator between 1977 and 1979 and member of the Congress of Deputies between 1979 and 1982.

Under his ministry, the Workers' Statute, the basic Spanish labour legislation was approved.

In 2008 he received the Txemi Cantera International Social Economy Prize from ASLE, which recognises "those people and organizations that have stood out for their support to the Social Economy".

Calvo Ortega died on 27 October 2025, at the age of 92.
