= Carlos Bustelo =

Spanish politician (born 1936)

Carlos Bustelo y García del Real (born 1936) served as the Spanish Minister of Industry from 1979 to 1980.

At the time Bustelo entered the cabinet, Spain was emerging from the Franco years and economic development had to contend with what Bustelo called, "the crushing mental inertia," inherited from the old regime.

== Books ==
- Roca, Jordi; Alier, Juan Martínez (1986). 1936-1986, from Civil War to contemporary Spain: concertation and economic policy. Harvard University, Minda de Gunzburg Center for European Studies.
