= Juan Antonio García Díez =

Spanish politician

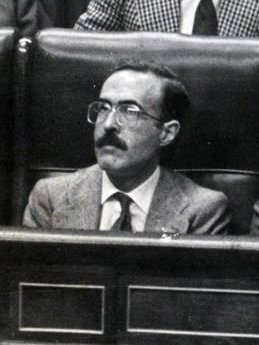

Deputy Prime Minister for Economic Affairs of Spain
- In office 30 July 1982 – 3 December 1982
- Prime Minister: Leopoldo Calvo-Sotelo
- Preceded by: Rodolfo Martín Villa
- Succeeded by: Alfonso Guerra

Second Deputy Prime Minister of Spain
- In office 2 December 1981 – 30 July 1982
- Prime Minister: Leopoldo Calvo-Sotelo
- Preceded by: Leopoldo Calvo-Sotelo
- Succeeded by: Rodrigo Rato

Ministry of Economy and Trade
- In office 9 September 1980 – 3 December 1982
- Prime Minister: Adolfo Suárez; Leopoldo Calvo-Sotelo
- Preceded by: José Luis Leal Maldonado
- Succeeded by: Miguel Boyer

Ministry of Trade and Tourism
- In office 5 July 1977 – 3 May 1980
- Prime Minister: Adolfo Suárez
- Preceded by: José Lladó Fernández-Urrutia
- Succeeded by: Luis Gámir

Personal details
- Born: Juan Antonio García Díez; 4 August 1940 Madrid, Spain
- Died: 6 May 1998 (aged 57) Madrid, Spain
- Party: UCD
- Other political affiliations: PSD (1976–78)
- Education: Complutense University of Madrid

Juan Antonio García Díez (4 August 1940 – 6 May 1998) was a Spanish politician from the Union of the Democratic Centre (UCD) who held several cabinet posts between 1977 and 1982, most prominently serving as Deputy Prime Minister of Spain from December 1981 to December 1982.
