= José Manuel Otero =

Spanish politician (born 1940)

Minister of Education
- In office 6 April 1979 – 9 September 1980
- Prime Minister: Adolfo Suárez
- Preceded by: Íñigo Cavero
- Succeeded by: Juan Antonio Ortega y Díaz-Ambrona

Minister of the Presidency Secretary of the Council of Ministers
- In office 5 July 1977 – 6 April 1979
- Prime Minister: Adolfo Suárez
- Preceded by: Alfonso Osorio
- Succeeded by: José Pedro Pérez-Llorca

Personal details
- Born: José Manuel Otero Novas; 20 March 1940 (age 86) Vigo, Spain
- Party: UCD
- Education: University of Oviedo

José Manuel Otero Novas (born 20 March 1940) is a Spanish politician from the Union of the Democratic Centre (UCD) who served as Minister of Education from April 1979 to September 1980 and previously as Minister of the Presidency from July 1977 to April 1979.
