= Íñigo Cavero =

Spanish politician (1929–2002)

The Most Excellent and Most Illustrious The Baron of Carondelet
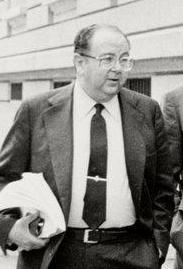
- Cavero in 1981

President of the Spanish Council of State
- In office 29 May 1996 – 25 December 2002
- Preceded by: Fernando Ledesma Bartret
- Succeeded by: José Manuel Romay Beccaría

Minister of Culture
- In office 8 September 1980 – 2 December 1981
- Monarch: Juan Carlos I
- Prime Minister: Adolfo Suárez; Leopoldo Calvo-Sotelo
- Preceded by: Ricardo de la Cierva
- Succeeded by: Soledad Becerril

Minister of Justice
- In office 6 April 1979 – 8 September 1980
- Monarch: Juan Carlos I
- Prime Minister: Adolfo Suárez
- Preceded by: Landelino Lavilla Alsina
- Succeeded by: Francisco Fernández Ordóñez

Minister of Education and Science
- In office 6 July 1977 – 4 April 1979
- Monarch: Juan Carlos I
- Prime Minister: Adolfo Suárez
- Preceded by: Aurelio Menéndez
- Succeeded by: José Manuel Otero

Member of the Congress of Deputies
- In office 22 June 1986 – 2 September 1989
- Constituency: Madrid
- In office 1 March 1979 – 18 November 1982
- Constituency: Baleares
- In office 15 June 1977 – 2 January 1979
- Constituency: Madrid

Personal details
- Born: Íñigo Cavero Lataillade; 1 August 1929 San Sebastián, Spain
- Died: 25 December 2002 (aged 73) Madrid, Spain
- Party: People's Party (after 1991)
- Other political affiliations: Democratic and Social Centre (1989–1991); People's Democratic Party (1985–1989); Union of the Democratic Centre (1977–1983); Christian Democratic Party (1977–1978); Popular Christian Democratic Party (1975–1977); Democratic Left (until 1975)
- Education: University of Deusto; Complutense University of Madrid

Íñigo Cavero Lataillade, Marquis of el Castillo de Aysa, Baron of Carondelet, Baron of la Torre (1 August 1929 – 25 December 2002) was a Spanish aristocrat, lawyer and politician.

== Biography and career ==
Born in San Sebastián on 1 August 1929, Cavero attended Our Lady of Remembrance College, Madrid before commencing studies in law and economics at the University of Deusto. Cavero completed his legal studies at the Complutense University of Madrid, where he later taught. Cavero joined the Grupo Tácito in 1973, and left the group two years later.

At that time, Cavero also ended his involvement with the Democratic Left. In 1975, Cavero became a founding member of the Christian Democratic People's Party. After joining the Union of the Democratic Centre, Cavero was elected to his first term on the Congress of Deputies as a representative from Madrid. He was reelected in 1979, as a deputy from Baleares. While serving consecutive terms as a member of the Congress of Deputies, Cavero also held several cabinet positions. He contested the congressional elections in 1982 in Grenada, but did not win. He remained the general secretary of the UDC until the party's dissolution in 1983. Cavero then assumed leadership roles in the People's Democratic Party and returned to the Congress of Deputies, winning election from Madrid in 1986. Cavero switched party affiliation to the Democratic and Social Centre in 1989 and ran for reelection in Burgos. He lost that year's election, and became a member of the People's Party in 1991.

Cavero was named to the Spanish Council of State in 1996, and served until his death on 25 December 2002, of a heart attack at Clínica de La Luz in Madrid. He was 73.
