= Luis Gámir =

Spanish politician (1942–2017)

Minister of Trade and Tourism
- In office 3 May 1980 – 9 September 1980

Minister of Transport and Communication
- In office 2 December 1981 – 2 December 1982

Member of the Congress of Deputies
- In office 1977–1982
- Constituency: Alicante
- In office 1993–2004
- Constituency: Murcia
- In office 2004–2008
- Constituency: Madrid

Personal details
- Born: Luis Gámir Casares; 8 May 1942 Madrid
- Died: 15 January 2017 (aged 74) Madrid
- Party: People's Party
- Other political affiliations: Union of the Democratic Centre (until 1982)
- Education: Complutense University of Madrid
- Occupation: politician
- Profession: economist

Luis Gámir Casares (8 May 1942 – 15 January 2017) was a Spanish politician.
