= Jaime Lamo de Espinosa =

Spanish politician (born 1941)

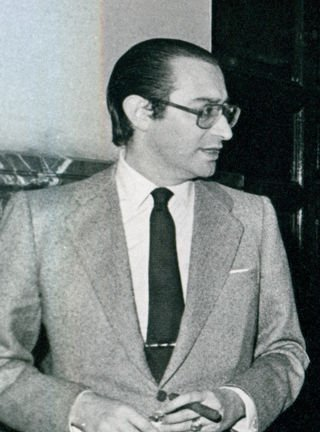

Deputy Minister to the Prime Minister, without portfolio
- In office 2 December 1981 – 30 July 1982
- Prime Minister: Leopoldo Calvo-Sotelo
- Preceded by: Office established
- Succeeded by: Office disestablished

Minister of Agriculture and Fisheries
- In office 14 May 1981 – 2 December 1981
- Prime Minister: Leopoldo Calvo-Sotelo
- Preceded by: Himself
- Succeeded by: José Luis Álvarez

Minister of Agriculture and Fisheries
- In office 25 February 1978 – 14 May 1981
- Prime Minister: Adolfo Suárez; Leopoldo Calvo-Sotelo
- Preceded by: José Enrique Martínez Genique
- Succeeded by: Himself

Personal details
- Born: Jaime Lamo de Espinosa y Michels de Champourcin; 4 April 1941 (age 85) Madrid, Spain
- Party: UCD

Jaime Lamo de Espinosa y Michels de Champourcin, 13th Marquess of Mirasol and 14th Baron of Frignani and Frignestani (born 4 April 1941) is a Spanish noble and politician who served as Minister of Agriculture from February 1978 to December 1981, under Adolfo Suárez and Leopoldo Calvo-Sotelo.
