= Jesús Sancho Rof =

Spanish politician and professor

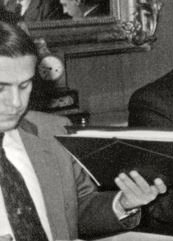
Jesús Sancho Rof in 1981

Jesús Sancho Rof (December 16, 1940 in Madrid) is a Spanish politician and university professor who was a minister in the UCD governments during the presidencies of Adolfo Suárez and Leopoldo Calvo-Sotelo. He is also Doctor in Physical Sciences from the Complutense University of Madrid, on which he was Professor of Optics and Structure of Matter.

In the last years of the Francoist regime, he was general director of Radio Televisión Española (RTVE), replacing Juan José Rosón. In democracy he was director of the DGPI, an organ of Ministry of the Interior. He was the founder and leader of the Independent Social Federation, a group of social democratic courts that Sancho Rof defined as "humanist socialism", which would end up being part of the Union of the Democratic Centre and in the 1977 Spanish general election he was elected deputy with said party for the province of Pontevedra, repeating in the 1982 and 1986 elections, this time with People's Alliance.

In 1979 he was appointed Minister of Public Works and Urbanism where he promised the construction of a million floors of official protection and undertakes a plan to eradicate slums on the basis of the provision of single-family homes. He repeatedly defended the need for combining development policies with the respect for the environment. With the coming to power of Leopoldo Calvo-Sotelo in 1981, he was appointed Minister of Labor, Health and Social Security., In 1981, he made controversial declarations about the health crisis of toxic oil syndrome weeks after the death of the first victim. He said: "(The syndrome) is less serious than the flu. It is caused by a little bug whose proper name and first name we know. We only miss the second one. It is so small that, if it falls off the table, it kills itself". He left the office after that.
