= 1st Congress of Deputies =

This is a list of members of the first Legislature of the Congress of Deputies of Spain. They were elected in the 1979 elections.

- Fernando Abril Martorell
- Joan Canadell Pujadas
- José Acosta Cubero
- Ricard Casanovas pons
- Ricard Anglada Soler
- Ramon Caus Font
- Jan Codinachs Casases
- Julio Aguilar Azañón
- Juan Carlos Aguilar Moreno
- José Antonio Aguiriano
- Francisco Aguirre de la Hoz
- Iñigo Aguirre Kerexeta
- Jesús Aizpún Tuero
- Maciá Alavedra
- Josep Lluís Albiñana Olmos
- Felipe Alcaraz
- Fernando Alcón
- Antonio Juan Alfonso Quirós
- Mariano Alierta Izuel
- Joaquín Almunia
- Emilio Alonso Sarmiento
- José Luis Álvarez Álvarez
- Fernando Álvarez de Miranda y Torres
- José Álvarez de Paz
- José Antonio Amate
- Luis Apostúa
- Maria Soledad Arahuetes
- José Luis de Arce Martínez
- Juana Arce Molina
- José María de Areilza, Count of Motrico
- Rafael Arias-Salgado
- Fernando Aristizábal Recarte
- José Arnau Figuerola
- Miguel Ángel Arredonda
- Xabier Arzalluz
- Emilio Attard Alonso
- Joseba Azkarraga
- Enrique Ballestero Pareja
- Rafael Ballesteros
- Jaime Ballesteros
- Anna Balletbó i Puig
- Juan María Bandrés
- Alfonso Bañón Seijas
- Jaime Barnola
- Enrique Barón Crespo
- Juan Antonio Barragán
- Juan Barranco Gallardo
- Heribert Barrera
- Soledad Becerril
- José María Benegas
- Luis Berenguer Fuster
- Fernando Bergasa Perdomo
- Manuel Bermejo Hernández
- Ramón Bernal Soto
- Jaime Blanco García
- Pedro Bofill
- Emérito Bono Martínez
- José Bono Martínez
- Juan Botanch Dausa
- Miguel Boyer
- Pilar Brabo
- José Miguel Bravo de Laguna
- José María Bris
- José Miguel Bueno
- León Buil Giral
- Gerardo Bujanda Sarasola
- Juli Busquets
- Esteban Caamaño Bernal
- Pío Cabanillas Gallas
- Enrique Cabezas
- Francisco Cabral Oliveros
- Fernando Calahorro
- Rafael Calvo Ortega
- Leopoldo Calvo-Sotelo
- Marcelino Camacho
- Blas Camacho Zancada
- Ignacio Camuñas Solís
- Eusebio Cano
- Antón Cañellas Balcells
- Víctor María Carrascal
- Santiago Carrillo
- Antonio Carro
- José Antonio da Casa
- Benjamín Casañ Bernal
- Carmelo Casaño Salido
- Pablo Castellano Cardalliaguet
- Jaume Castells Ferrer
- Julio de Castro Hitos
- Íñigo Cavero
- Manuel Chaves González
- Ricardo de la Cierva y Hoces
- Carlos Cigarrán
- Gabriel Cisneros
- Manuel Francisco Claveros
- Salvador Clotas
- Juan Luis Colino
- Carlos Corcuera Orbegozo
- Ángel Cristóbal Montes
- Asunción Cruañes
- Alberto Javier Cuartas
- Llibert Cuatrecasas
- Juan Cuenca Doblado
- José Ángel Cuerda Montoya
- Justo de las Cuevas
- Josep María Cullel i Nadal
- Antonio Díaz Fuentes
- Ciriaco Díaz Porras
- Ángel Díaz Sol
- Manuel Díaz-Pinas
- Miguel Durán Pastor
- Enrique Egea Ibáñez
- Jesús María Elorriaga
- José Antonio Escartín
- Rafael Escuredo Rodríguez
- Jesús Esperabé de Arteaga
- Alberto Estella Goytre
- Luis Fajardo Spínola
- Antonio Faura Sanmartín
- Manuel Ángel Fernández Arias
- Andrés Fernández Fernández
- Horacio Fernández Inguanzo
- Jesús Salvador Fernández Moreda
- Francisco Fernández Ordóñez
- Juan Julio Fernández Rodríguez
- María Fernández-España
- José Luis Figuerola
- Antonio Fontán
- Manuel Fraga Iribarne
- Luis Fuertes Fuertes
- José Antonio Gago
- Joaquín Galant
- Guillermo Galeote Jiménez
- Ignacio Gallego
- José Miguel Galván Bello
- Luis Gámir Casares
- Jaime Julián García Añoveros
- Ludivina García Arias
- Carmen García Bloise
- Juan Antonio García Díez
- Tomás García García
- José García-Margallo y Marfil
- Antonio García Miralles
- José García Pérez
- Emilio García Pumarino
- Cipriano García Rollán
- Cipriano García Sánchez
- Carmela García-Moreno
- Joaquín García-Romanillos
- Francisco Gari Mir
- Joaquín Garrigues Walker
- Carles Gasoliba i Bohm
- Carlos Alfonso Gila González
- José María Gil-Albert
- Juan Antonio Gómez Angulo
- Hipólito Gómez de las Roces
- Eulogio Gómez Franqueira
- Luis Gómez Llorente
- José González Delgado
- José Antonio González García
- Felipe González
- Dionisio González Otazo
- Luis González Seara
- Fernando Juan González Vila
- Manuel Gracia Navarro
- Isidoro Gracia
- Esteban Granado Bombín
- Luis de Grandes Pascual
- Felipe Guardiola Selles
- Alfonso Guerra
- Julen Guimón
- Isidoro Hernández-Sito
- Miguel Herrero y Rodríguez
- Jesús Hervella
- Ignacio Javier Huelín
- Antonio María Ibarguren
- María Izquierdo Rojo
- Angel Luis Jaime y Baró
- Antonio Jiménez Blanco
- Pedro Jover Presa
- María Josefa Lafuente
- Jaime Lamo de Espinoza
- Ángel Lasunción
- Landelino Lavilla Alsina
- Alfonso Lazo Díaz
- Ricardo León Herrero
- Joan Lerma
- Francisco Letamendía
- Andrés Limón Jiménez
- Ernest Lluch
- Eduardo López Albizu
- Josep López de Lerma
- José Luis López Fajardo
- Gregorio López Raimundo
- Baldomero Lozano
- Demetrio Madrid López
- Manuel Marín
- Antonio Márquez Fernández
- Santiago Marraco Solana
- César Martín Montes
- José María Martín Oviedo
- Martiniano Martín
- Eduardo Martín Toval
- Rodolfo Martín Villa
- Miguel Ángel Martínez Martínez
- Gervasio Martínez-Villaseñor
- Sebastián Martín-Retortillo
- Zenón Mascareño
- Enrique de la Mata
- Marta Angela Mata i Garriga
- José Antonio Maturana
- Jaime Mayor Oreja
- José Luis Tomás Mederos
- Guillermo Medina González
- José Luis Meilán Gil
- Pedro Menchero
- Cándido Méndez Rodríguez
- José María Mesa Parra
- Joaquím Molins i Prat
- Andoni Monforte
- Enrique Monsonís
- Antonio Montserrat Solé
- Telesforo Monzón
- Dolores Blanca Morenas
- Eduardo Moreno Díez
- José Luis Moreno García
- Elena María Moreno
- Marcelino Moreta
- Antonio Morillo Crespo
- Javier Moscoso del Prado
- Arturo Moya Moreno
- Enrique Múgica Herzog
- Faustino Muñoz García
- Joaquín Muñoz Peirats
- José Nasarre de Letosa
- Carlos Navarrete Merino
- Joaquín Navarro Estevan
- Manuel Núñez Encabo
- Miguel Núñez González
- Manuel Núñez Pérez
- Josep María Obiols
- Raimon Obiols
- Lorenzo Olarte Cullen
- Alberto Carlos Oliart
- Francisco Olivencia
- Marcelino Oreja, 1st Marquis of Oreja
- Antonio Orpez Asensi
- Alfonso Osorio García
- José Manuel Otero
- Néstor Padrón Delgado
- Antonio Palomares Vinuesa
- Pablo Pardo Yáñez
- Francisco Parras i Collado
- Juan Pastor Marco
- Josep Pau i Pernau
- Gonzalo Payo Subiza
- Gregorio Peces-Barba
- José Manuel Pedregosa
- Pedro Pegenaute
- Antonio Peinado Moreno
- Gregorio Peláez Redajo
- María Dolores Pelayo
- Ángel Manuel Perera Calle
- Diego Pérez Espejo
- Avelino Pérez Fernández
- Jesús Pérez López
- Félix Manuel Pérez Miyares
- Fernando Pérez Royo
- Emilio Pérez Ruiz
- José Pedro Pérez-Llorca
- Jose Maria Pernas Martínez
- Antonio Piazuelo Plou
- José Ramón Pin Arboledas
- Blas Piñar
- José Manuel Piñeiro
- Josep Pi-Soler
- Adela Pla Pastor
- José Plana Plana
- Félix Pons
- Rafael Portanet Suárez
- Lluís María de Puig
- Josep Pujadas Domingo
- Jordi Pujol
- Juan Quintas Seoane
- Juan de Dios Ramírez Heredia
- Juan Ramos Camarero
- Francisco Ramos Fernández
- Francesc Ramos i Molins
- Nicolás Redondo
- Juan Manuel Reol
- Joan Reventós
- María Teresa Revilla
- Josep María Riera Mercader
- Joan Rigol
- Miquel Roca i Junyent
- Xavier Rocha i Rocha
- José Vaier Rodríguez Alcaide
- Martín Rodríguez Contreras
- Juan Carlos Rodríguez Ibarra
- Luis Javier Rodríguez Moroy
- José Luis Rodríguez Pardo
- Antonio Rodríguez Rodríguez
- Agustín Rodríguez Sahagún
- León Rodríguez Valverde
- Santiago Rodríguez-Miranda
- Alejandro Rojas Marcos
- Juan Rovira Tarazona
- Emilio Rubiales
- María Rubies Garrofe
- Vicente Ruiz Monrabal
- José Luis Ruiz-Navarro
- Ana María Ruiz-Tagle
- Javier Rupérez
- Jerónimo Saavedra
- José Sabalete Jiménez
- Juan Sabater Escuder
- Eduardo Saborido Galán
- Javier Sáenz Cosculluela
- Félix Sáenz Lorenzo
- Juan Ignacio Sáenz-Díez
- Fernando Sagaseta
- Ramón Sala Canadell
- José Miguel Salinas Moya
- Manuel Sánchez Ayuso
- Enrique Sánchez de León
- Simón Sánchez Moreno
- Salvador Sánchez Terán
- José María Sanjuán Borja
- Carlos Sanjuán de la Rocha
- Jesús Sanjurjo González
- Miguel Sanmartín Losada
- Diego de los Santos López
- Francisco Sanz Fernández
- Enrique Sapena Granell
- Manuel de Sárraga Gómez
- Nicolás Sartorius Álvarez
- Joaquín Satrústegui
- Antonio de Senillosa
- Carlos Sentís
- Pedro Silva Cienfuegos
- Pedro María Solabarría
- Javier Solana
- Luis Solana Madariaga
- Carmen Solano Carreras
- José Solé Barberá
- Jordi Solé Tura
- Alfonso Soler Turmo
- Francisco Soler Valero
- Vicente Sotillo
- Fernando Soto Martín
- Adolfo Suárez
- Ramón Tamames Gómez
- Jaime Tejada Lorenzo
- Enrique Tierno Galván
- Baudilio Tomé
- Francisco de la Torre Prados
- Leopoldo Torres Boursault
- Manuel Torres Izquierdo
- Antonio Torres Salvador
- Josep María Trías
- Ramón Trías Fargas
- Juan Francisco Triay Llopis
- Josep María Triginer
- José Antonio Trillo
- Julio Ulloa Vence
- Gabriel Urralburu
- Luis Uruñuela Fernández
- José Valentín i Antón
- José Luis del Valle Pérez
- Juan Luis de la Vallina
- Jaume Valls i Ortíz
- Ramón Vargas-Machuca
- José Vazquez Fouz
- Antonio Vázquez Guillén
- Elena Vázquez Menéndez
- Francisco José Vázquez Vázquez
- Luis Vega y Escandón
- Josep Verde i Aldea
- Jesús María Viana Santa Cruz
- Ciriaco de Vicente Martín
- José Vida Soria
- José Vidal Riembau
- Nona Vilariño Salgado
- Eulalia Vintro Castells
- Marcos Vizcaya Retana
- Luis Yáñez-Barnuevo
- Perfecto Yebra
- Francisco Javier Yuste
- Virgilio Zapatero
- Francisco Zaragoza Gomis
