= 2nd Congress of Deputies =

This is a list of members of the Congress of Deputies of Spain that were elected in the 1982 general election.

- Ana María Abascal
- Manuel Abejón Adamez
- Alberto Acítores
- José Acosta Cubero
- José Luis Adsuar Ferrando
- Manuel Ángel Aguilar Belda
- Iñigo Aguirre Kerexeta
- Jesús Aizpún Tuero
- Juan Alfonso Pérez
- Joaquín Almunia
- Conrado Alonso Buitrón
- José Luis Álvarez Álvarez
- José Álvarez de Paz
- Oscar Alzaga
- José Antonio Amate Rodríguez
- Jaume Antich
- Francisco Arnau Navarro
- José Luis Asenjo Díaz
- Juan Miguel Asperilla
- José María Aznar
- Alenadro Jesús Bahillo
- Enrique Ballestero Pareja
- Rafael Ballesteros
- Anna Balletbó i Puig
- Juan María Bandrés Molet
- Enrique Barón Crespo
- Juan Antonio Barragán
- Juan Barranco Gallardo
- Jaime Javier Barrero López
- Pablo Beltrán de Heredia
- Enrique Beltrán Sanz
- José María Benegas
- Felipe Benítez Barrueco
- Luis Berenguer Fuster
- María Reyes Barruezo
- José Vicente Beviá
- Juan Blanch
- Jaime Blanco García
- Salvador Blanco Rubio
- Pedro Bofill
- José Bono Martínez
- Juan Botanch Dausa
- José Miguel Bravo de Laguna
- Carlos María Bru
- José Miguel Bueno Vicente
- Juli Busquets
- Abel Caballero
- Pío Cabanillas
- Fernando Calahorro
- Jesús Caldera Sánchez-Capitán
- Juan Ramón Calero Rodríguez
- Leopoldo Calvo-Sotelo
- Carmen del Campo Casasús
- Gabriel Camuñas Solís
- Eusebio Cano
- Manuel Cantarero del Castillo
- José Cañellas Fonz
- Ángel Capdevila Blanco
- Ignasi Carnicer i Barrufet
- Santiago Carrillo
- Antonio Carro Martínez
- Jaume Casademont
- Santos Cascallana
- Pablo Castellano Cardalliaguet
- Jaume Castells
- Francisco Javier Castro
- Angel Castroviejo Calvo
- Elías Cebrián Torralba
- Alejandro Cercas
- Pedro Cerezo Galán
- Pedro María Chacón Nobel
- Manuel Chaves González
- Julián Chia Gutiérrez
- Gabriel Cisneros
- Rafael Clavijo
- Salvador Clotas
- Aniceto Codesal
- Juan Luis Colino
- Joan Colom i Naval
- José Luis Corcuera
- José Correas Parralejo
- José Arturo Corte Mier
- Manuel Costas Alonso
- Jorge Francisco Cremades
- Luis Carlos Croissier
- Asunción Cruañes
- Juan Cruz Sagredo
- Llibert Cuatrecasas
- Alvaro Cuesta Martínez
- Teresa Cunillera
- Jaime Custodi
- Carlos Alberto Dávila
- Blas Díaz Bonillo
- Antonio Díaz Fuentes
- Diego Díaz Pozas
- Ángel Díaz Sol
- Manuel Díaz-Pines
- José Donadeu
- Emilio Durán Corsanego
- Josep Antoni Duran i Lleida
- Alberto Durán Núñez
- Ignacio Echeberría
- Jesús María Elio Oficialdegui
- Gabriel Elorriaga
- Luis Escribano
- Arturo Escuder Croft
- Ignacio Esnaola Etcheberry
- José Luis Estrada
- Juan Manuel Fabra Vallés
- Luis Fajardo Spínola
- Joaquín Fayos Díaz
- Francisco Fernández Cortés
- Horacio Fernández Inguanzo
- Horacio Fernández Martínez
- Francisco Fernández Marugán
- Jesús Salvador Fernández Moreda
- Francisco Fernández Ordóñez
- Manuel Fernández-Escandón
- María Fernández-España
- Joaquím Ferrer Roca
- Manuel Fraga Iribarne
- Modesto Fraile
- Francisco Fráiz Armada
- Donato Fuejo
- Félix de la Fuente Boada
- Francisco Fuentes Gallardo
- Jesús Fuentes Lázaro
- José Ignacio Fuentes López
- Guillermo Galeote Jiménez
- José Antonio Gallego López
- Manuel Gallent Nicola
- Jon Gangoiti
- Fernando García Agudín
- Manuel García Amigo
- Ludivina García Arias
- Carmen García Bloise
- Ricardo García Damborenea
- Eduardo García Espinosa
- Luis García Forcada
- José Luis García García
- Antonio García Miralles
- Antonio García Olid
- Angel García Ronda
- Sebastián García Tomás
- Jenaro García-Arreciado
- Carmela García-Moreno
- Antonio García-Pagán
- Arturo García-Tizón
- José Manuel Garrido
- Fernando Garrido Valenzuela
- Carles Gasoliba
- Angel José Gavilán
- Francisco Gaviña Ribelles
- Ignacio Gil
- Carlos Alfonso Gila
- Manuel Giner Miralles
- Ignacio Gomara
- José Domingo Gómez
- Hipólito Gómez de las Roces
- Eulogio Gómez Franqueira
- Josep Gomis i Martí
- José Manuel Gónzalez García
- Felipe González
- Dionisio González Otazo
- Enrique González Vaello
- Francisco González Zapico
- Javier González-Estéfani
- Ana Gorroño
- Enrique Gozalbes
- Isidoro Gracia Plaza
- Francisco Granados Calero
- José de Gregorio Torres
- Felipe Guardiola Selles
- Alfonso Guerra
- Rodolf Guerra i Fontana
- José Antonio Guerrero Guerrero
- Julen Guimón
- Carmen Hermosín
- Juan Ramón Hernández Espallargas
- Miguel Herrero y Rodríguez
- Florencio Hidalgo-Barquero
- José Higueras Muñoz
- Rafael Hinojosa i Lucena
- César Huidobro
- Pedro Jover Presa
- Vicente Juan Villar
- Guillermo Kirkpátric
- Juan Ramón Lagunilla
- Álvaro de Lapuerta
- Luis Larroque Allende
- José Ramón Lasuén
- Landelino Lavilla Alsina
- Alfonso Lazo Díaz
- Joaquín Leguina
- Joan Lerma
- Carmen Lorca Villaplana
- José Ignacio Llorens
- Ernest Lluch
- Josep López de Lerma
- Alberto López Fernández
- Francisco Javier López García
- Santiago López González
- Hilario López Luna
- Gregorio López Raimundo
- Carlos López Riaño
- Salvador López Sanz
- José Manuel Macarro
- Manuela de Madre Ortega
- Demetrio Madrid
- Jesús Malon Nicolao
- Carlos Manglano de Mas
- Joan Marcet i Morera
- Luis Mardones Sevilla
- Manuel Marín
- Santiago Marraco
- Jordi Marsal Muntalá
- Alfonso Tomás Martín
- Eduardo Martín Toval
- Rodolfo Martín Villa
- José Enrique Martínez del Río
- Manuel Martínez García
- Enrique Martínez Martínez
- Miguel Angel Martínez Martínez
- Luis Martínez Noval
- Angel Martínez Sanjuan
- Abel Matutes
- Victorino Mayoral
- Manuel Medina
- Cándido Méndez
- César de Miguel López
- Gregorio Mir
- Anastasio Modrego
- Juan Molina Cabrera
- Joaquím Molins
- Andoni Monforte
- Isaías Monforte
- Paulino Montesdeoca Sánchez
- Juan Antonio Montesinos
- Fernando Morán López
- Javier Moscoso López
- José Joaquín Moya
- Pedro Moya Milanés
- Enrique Múgica Herzog
- Juan Muñoz García
- Carlos Navarrete Merino
- Antonio Navarro Velasco
- Francisco Neira León
- Jerónimo Nieto
- Jorge Novella Suárez
- Manuel Núñez Encabo
- Manuel Núñez Pérez
- Josep María Obiols
- Angel Olarte Lasa
- Francisco Oliva García
- Antonio Olivenza Posas
- Juan María Ollora Ochoa
- Marcelino Oreja Aguirre
- Luis Ortíz González
- Alfonso Osorio García
- Iñigo de Otazu
- Néstor Padrón Delgado
- Juan Ramón Pajares
- Marcelo Palacios Alonso
- Pablo Paños Martí
- Pablo Pardo Yáñez
- Josep Pau i Bernau
- Gregorio Peces Barba
- José Manuel Pedregosa
- María Dolores Pelayo
- Antonio Peña Suárez
- José Joaquín Peñarrubia
- Francisco Perea Torres
- Fernando Pérez Roya
- Joaquín Pérez Siquier
- Antonio Pérez Solano
- José Javier Pérez Olivares
- Antonio Pillado Montero
- María Pinedo Sánchez
- Adela Pla Pastor
- Luis Planas Puchades
- Miguel Ángel Planas Segurado
- Antonio Pol González
- José Enrique Pons Grau
- Joan Manuel del Pozo
- Neftalí Prieto
- Domingo Prieto García
- Lluis María de Puig
- Eduard Punset
- Luis Ramallo García
- Juan Ramallo Massanet
- Juan de Dios Ramírez Heredia
- Miguel Ramón Izquierdo
- Francisco Ramos Fernández Torrecilla
- Francesc Ramos i Molins
- Vicente Ramos Pérez
- Rodrigo de Rato
- Nicolás Redondo
- María Dolores Renau
- Manuel María Renedo
- Juan Ángel del Rey Castellanos
- Jaime Ribas Prats
- Pedro José Rico
- Miquel Roca i Junyent
- Mateo José Rodríguez
- Juan Carlos Rodríguez Ibarra
- Antonio Rodríguez Rodríguez
- Agustín Rodríguez Sahagún
- León Máximo Rodríguez
- Francisco Javier Rojo García
- José Manuel Romay
- Joan Romero González
- Alejandro Royo Villanueva
- Xavier Rubert de Ventós
- José María Ruiz Gallardón
- Carlos Ruiz Soto
- José Luis Ruiz Navarro
