= Francisco Aguirre (disambiguation) =

Francisco Aguirre (1910–1967) was a Cuban politician and trade unionist.

Francisco Aguirre may also refer to:

- Francisco Aguirre de la Hoz (born 1943), Spanish lawyer and politician
- Francisco Aguirre (Paraguayan footballer) (1907–?), Paraguayan footballer
- Francisco Aguirre-Velasquez, Salvadoran activist for the rights of workers and immigrants in the United States

== See also ==
- Francisco Aguirre Matos Mancebo, Dominican baseball player
- Francisco de Aguirre (disambiguation)
