= Gavina =

Gavina may refer to:

- Chris Gavina (born 1979), Filipino professional basketball coach
- Francisco Gaviña Ribelles (1941-1990), Spanish chemist and politician for the Spanish Socialist Workers' Party
- Nuno Manuel Gavina do Couto (born 1969), Portuguese radio voice, producer and owner of OR2 Web Productions
- Gaviña Gourmet Coffee, a coffee importer and roaster located in Vernon, California
- Tagiades menaka gavina, a species of spread-winged skipper butterflies

== See also ==
- Gavini (disambiguation)
