= Plenary of Members of Parliament of Valencia =

The Plenary of members of Parliament of the Valencian Country (in Valencian: Plenari de Parlamentaris del País Valencià) was the body formed and made up of the 41 Deputies to Congress and Senators elected in the first elections held in 1977 after Francoist Spain in the provinces of Alicante, Castellón and Valencia to give political autonomy to the Land of Valencia.

The Plenary met for the first time on August 6, 1977, in Valencia, presided over by the Socialist Joaquin Ruiz Mendoza, a meeting attended by the 29 Deputies and 12 Senators elected two months earlier who represented the Spanish Socialist Workers Party (13 Deputies and 7 Senators), Union of the Democratic Center (11 Deputies and 5 Senators), the Communist Party of Spain (2 Deputies), the Popular Socialist Party (1 Deputy), the Independent Candidacy of the Center (1 Deputy), and Popular Alliance (1 Deputy). At this first meeting the production of a Statute of autonomy was agreed upon, within the framework of a new Spanish Constitution that they aspired to, but did not even known if it would be addressed, as well as achieving a provisional pre-autonomic regime as a culmination of the legal process. Also agreed upon was the name, Plenario de Parliamentarios del País Valenciano (Parliamentary Plenary of the Valencian Country), unlike in other autonomous communities where they were named as Parliamentary Assemblies. The term "Valencian Country" was used and accepted by everyone being part of it, but this would later be a problem for its incorporation to autonomous status.

At the same meeting in Valencia, the Plenary agreed to convene a demonstration in support of the pre-autonomy process and the parliamentary initiative, on 9 October, two months later, in the city of Valencia, linking the process with the historic date. On the day of the announcement, more than half a million people attended the demonstration.

After the first meeting in August in Valencia, three others were held in Castellón, Alicante and Orihuela before the end of 1977. The meeting in Alicante formed the first group of parliamentarians who initiated the talks with the government for the establishment of a pre-autonomic system; the Orihuela meeting approved the substance of the aforementioned system. In 1978 there were two key meetings, held in February in Segorbe and Peñíscola, where the Spanish government was urged to quickly approve pre-autonomic regulations.

On March 1, 1978, the Plenary reached an agreement with the central government that a pre-autonomic system would be established. Ten days later the Council of Ministers agreed to it and six days after that two basic rules, a Royal Law Decree and a Royal Decree of development, were published.

In 1978, the autonomy process was initiated in Morella, culminating what would become the Statute of Autonomy of the Valencian Community. The President of the Valencian Generality, Josep Lluís Albinyana, convened a meeting of the Council of the Valencian Country on December 29, 1978, which was prevented by a heavy snowfall, and finally held on January 9, 1979. In that cold fifteenth-century Gothic hall of the Morella City Council, the proposal of President Albinyana was agreed upon, and by unanimous agreement of the parties PSOE, UCD, PCE, PSP and AP, the autonomy process, of the then officially named "Valencian Country", was initiated, in accordance with Article 151 of the Spanish Constitution, "in order to achieve the most perfect institutionalization of the Valencian community, for obtaining the maximum possible powers of self-government".

== Bibliography ==
- Various Authors, Les Corts Valencianes. Ed. President of the Valencian Parliament, Valencia 1989. ISBN 84-7579-776-8.
