= Sapena =

Sapena is a surname. Notable people with the surname include:

- Enrique Sapena Granell (1930–2008), Spanish politician
- Raúl Sapena Pastor (1908–1989), Paraguayan lawyer, diplomat, professor, and judge

== See also ==
- Subpoena
