= Ferrando (disambiguation) =

Ferrando may refer to:

- Ferrando, an Italian surname
- 161545 Ferrando, an asteroid
- Ferrando Bertelli, Italian engraver
