= De la Cierva =

De la Cierva (Spanish, 'of the deer') is a surname. Notable people with the surname include:

- Juan de la Cierva (1895–1936), Spanish civil engineer, pilot and aeronautical engineer
- Ricardo de la Cierva (1926–2015), Spanish historian and politician
