= Francisco Soler =

Francisco Soler may refer to:

- Francisco Soler Atencia (born 1970), Spanish retired footballer
- Francisco Soler (wrestler) (born 1992), Puerto Rican sport wrestler
- Francisco Soler Valero, Spanish lawyer and politician
