= José Pin Arboledas =

Spanish economist and politician

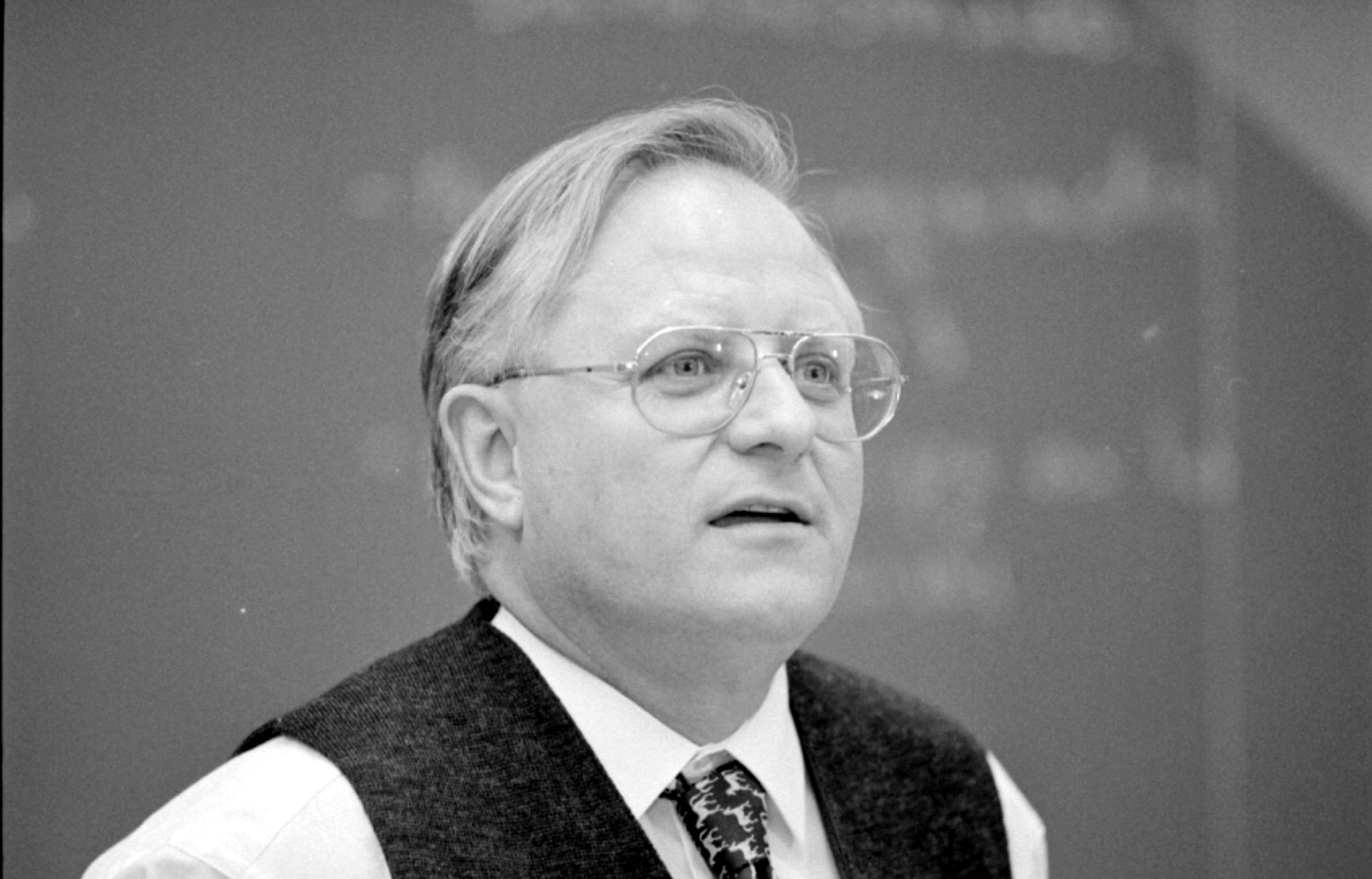
Jose Pin Arboledas

José Pin Arboledas (Madrid, Spain 1944) is a Spanish economist and politician.

After gaining a degree in economics from the University of Valencia, he became involved in politics, helping to found the People's Party. That party, not to be confused with the current grouping of the same name, joined with other parties to form the Union of the Democratic Centre (UCD) in 1977. As a UCD member, at the 1977 General Election, he was elected to the Spanish Congress of Deputies representing Valencia Province and was re-elected in the subsequent election in 1979.

In the UCD he was appointed provincial secretary in the Valencia region and was associated with a group known as "the young turks" who proposed a direction for the party called the "third way." In August 1982, together with 12 other MPs from the UCD, he quit the party to form the Democratic Popular Party (PDP). He did not stand at the 1982 General Election. In 1989, the PDP, together with other parties, formed the People's Party (PP). As a PP member Pin was elected to the Madrid Assembly at the 1993 elections. Two years later, he was elected to Madrid city council. As of 2010, he is a professor at the IESE Business School.

Pin is the brother of Margarita Pin, who has also represented Valencia Province in the Spanish Congress for the Spanish Socialist Workers' Party.
