= Antonio Palomares Vinuesa =

Spanish politician

Antonio Palomares Vinuesa (Albacete, Spain, 1930 - Valencia, Spain 24 March 2007) was a Spanish politician for the Communist Party of Spain (PCE).

Married with two children, Palomares fled with his family to France following the Nationalist victory in the Spanish Civil War. There he worked in a hospital for Spanish Civil War refugees and later as a milling machine operator. From 1944 to 1945 he worked for the French resistance opposing the Nazi occupation of France. He joined the PCE in 1945 and was a member of the youth wing from 1947 to 1958. In 1956 the party sent him to Spain to organise the PCE from within the country. There he worked in Madrid with prominent communist Julián Grimau. The PCE's central committee also sent him to organise the party in the Canary Islands and Murcia and on his return in 1967 he was appointed to lead the PCE in the Valencia region. In 1968 he was arrested with 35 other PCE members and tortured by police, only being released months later following an international campaign.

From 1976 to 1979 he was the first Secretary General of the Communist Party of the Valencian Country, the regional branch of the PCE in the Valencia region. At the 1979 General Election he was elected to the Spanish Congress of Deputies representing Valencia Province serving until 1982. During that time, together with Joan Lerma, Felipe Guardiola, José Pin Arboledas and Luis Berenguer, he helped to draft the Valencian Statute of Autonomy which resulted in full devolution of powers to the Valencia region.

As a result of that devolution elections to a Valencian Regional Assembly, the Corts Valencianes, were held in 1983 and Palomares was elected to the Corts, again representing Valencia Province.

His funeral was attended by numerous left wingers, including former President of the Valencian Community, Joan Lerma and former PCE leader Santiago Carrillo. Members of the People's Party, which at that time governed the Valencian Community, did not attend, though they sent condolences to his family.
