= Leopoldo Torres =

Leopoldo Torres is the name of:

- Leopoldo Torres Ríos, Argentine film director, father
- Leopoldo Torre Nilsson, Argentine film director, son
- Leopoldo Torres Balbás, Spanish architect
- Leopoldo Torres (politician), Spanish politician
