= Extremaduran Regional Action =

Extremaduran Regional Action Acción Regional Extremeña
- Secretary-General: Enrique Sánchez de León
- Founded: 7 November 1976
- Dissolved: October 1978
- Merged into: Union of the Democratic Centre
- Ideology: Regionalism
- Political position: Centre-right
- National affiliation: UCD

The Extremaduran Regional Action (Spanish: Acción Regional Extremeña; AREX) was a Spanish political party founded on 7 November 1976 as the first regionalist party in Extremadura. Enrique Sánchez de León was the party's secretary-general from 26 March 1977. AREX joined the Union of the Democratic Centre (UCD) electoral alliance ahead of the 1977 Spanish general election, gaining 4 seats in the Congress of Deputies. The party would be eventually merged into the UCD upon the party's constitution as a unitary party.
