= Andalusian Social Liberal Party =

Andalusian Social Liberal Party Partido Social Liberal Andaluz
- Chairman: Manuel Clavero
- Secretary-General: Antonio José Delgado
- Founded: 1976
- Dissolved: 1978
- Merged into: Union of the Democratic Centre
- Ideology: Andalusian regionalism Social liberalism Progressivism
- National affiliation: UCD

The Andalusian Social Liberal Party (Spanish: Partido Social Liberal Andaluz; PSLA) was a political party in Andalusia. The party was led by Manuel Clavero, Deputy Minister of the Regions. The party advocated regional autonomies, but not a federal state.

== History ==
The party was launched at a meeting in Seville December 12, 1976. The founding congress of the PSLA was held in Seville January 21–22, 1977, which elected a regional committee. Clavero Arévalo was elected chairman of the party and Antonio José Delgado general secretary. The party congress declared that the party sought alliances with other centrist forces. In July 1977 the historian Manuel Ruiz Lagos, founder and regional committee member of the PSLA, resigned from the party. The PSLA joined the Union of the Democratic Centre (UCD) electoral coalition ahead of the 1977 Spanish general election and would merge into the UCD upon its constitution as a unitary party in December 1977.
