= Gavini =

Gavini may refer to:

- Denis Gavini (1820-1916), French Bonapartist politician
- Weejasperaspis gavini, an extinct acanthothoracid placoderm found in the eastern Victoria, Australia
- 21515 Gavini, a minor planet discovered at Socorro, New Mexico, in 1988
- Gavinus (died 303), Christian saint, one of the Martyrs of Torres

== See also ==
- Gavina (disambiguation)
