= Rubén Gallego =

Russian writer (born 1968)

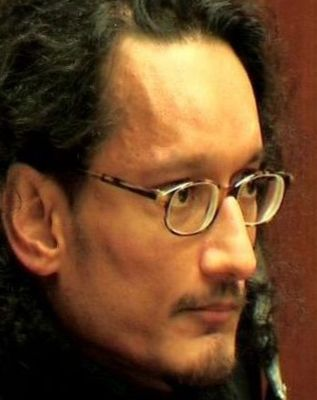
Rubén Gallego

Rubén David González Gallego (Russian: Рубен Давид Гонсалес Гальего; born 20 September 1968) is a Russian writer of Spanish ancestry.

After being born with severe cerebral palsy in the Soviet Union, Gallego was separated from his family at the age of one. He was sent to a state orphanage, because his grandfather, Ignacio Gallego, a Spanish Communist politician (General Secretary of the Spanish Communist Party since 1984), was ashamed of his birth disorder. He later told his daughter, Aurora Gallego Rodríguez (Rubén's mother), that her son had died.

Born without the use of his hands and feet, Gallego was tenacious and survived to adulthood, eventually marrying and having children. He lived in Russia and worked as a computer specialist until 2001, when he was reunited with his mother in Prague. Gallego lived in Freiburg, Germany, later moved to the United States. He now resides in Israel.

His memoir, White on Black, about his dreadful childhood in different Soviet orphanages won the Russian Booker Prize. The book was translated into English and published, in January 2006, as White on Black: A Boy's Story. An abridged version of the memoir was read on the Book of the Week programme on BBC Radio 4 in the week of March 20–24, 2006.

The book has also been translated into French (2002 by Aurora Gallego Rodríguez and Joëlle Roche-Parfenov, Actes Sud/Solin), Brazilian Portuguese (2004 by Luis Reyes Gil, Ediouro), Vietnamese (2005 by Vũ Thư Hiên), Swedish (2005 by Ola Wallin, Ersatz), Lithuanian (2005 by Andrius Šiuša), Polish (2005 by Katarzyna Maria Janowska, Wydawnictwo Znak), Finnish (2006 by Teemu Kaskinen, Sammakko), Icelandic (2007 by Helga Brekkan, JPV), Hebrew (2008 by S. Levin), Czech (2009 by Denisa Šťastná, Revolver Revue), Georgian (2009 by Nino Bekishvili), Esperanto (2010 by Kalle Kniivilä), Romanian (2019 by Liliana Radulescu and Nicoleta Silivestru), and Estonian (2020 by Valdek Kiiver).
