= Joaquín Muñoz Peirats =

Spanish politician

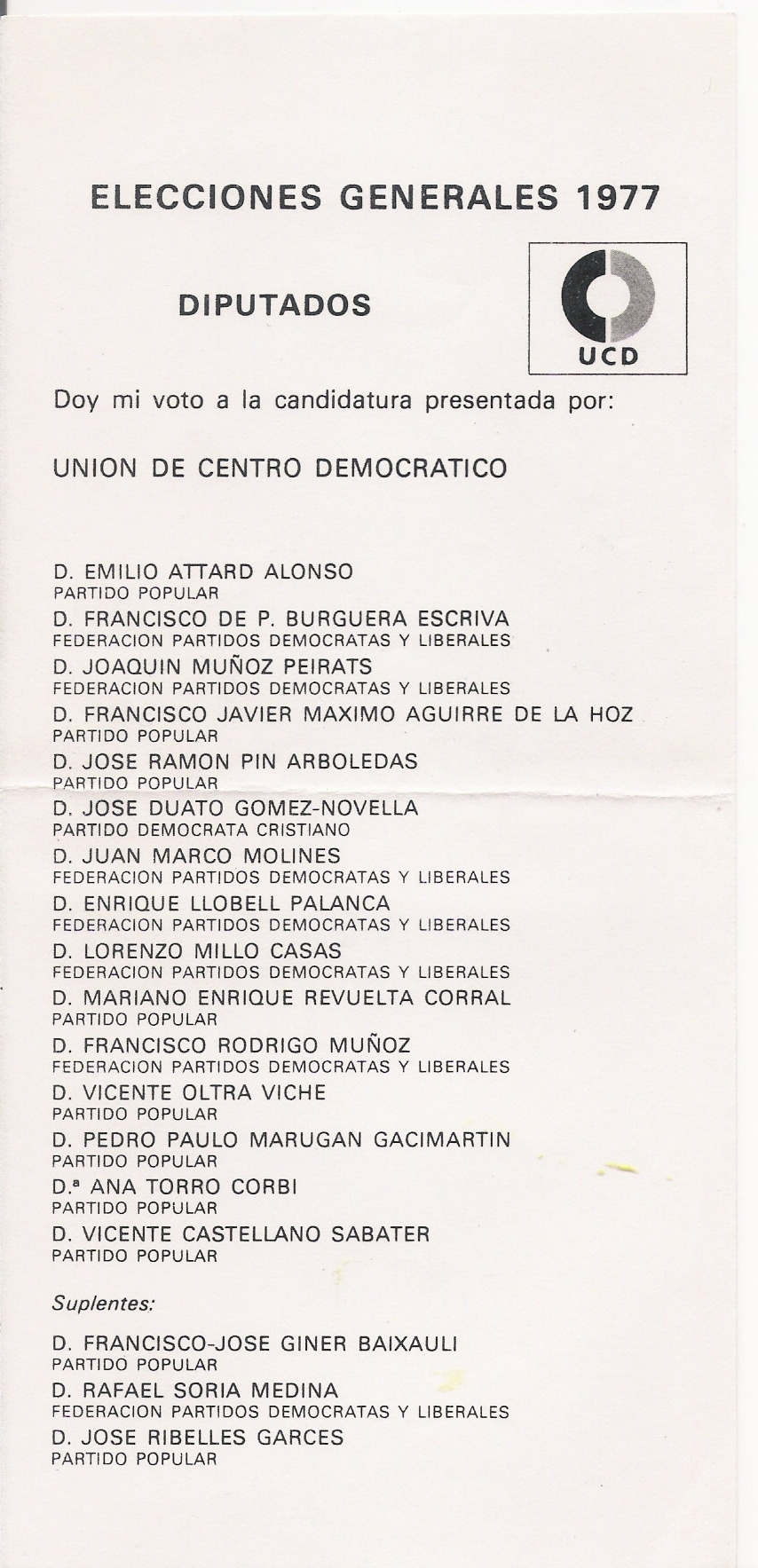
Describes the image pertaining to article

Joaquín Muñoz Peirats (Valencia, Spain, 1931 - Conakry, Guinea 1987) was a Spanish politician.

After gaining a degree in economics from the University of Deusto and a degree in law from the University of Valladolid he became involved in politics in the late 1960s. An ardent Monarchist, Muñoz belonged to the private council and secretariat of Don Juan de Borbón until its dissolution in 1969. However this attachment to symbolism later led to internal party conflicts.

In 1973 he formed the Liberal Democratic Party, which in 1977, joined with other parties to form the Union of the Democratic Centre (UCD). As a UCD member, at the 1977 General Election, he was elected to the Spanish Congress of Deputies representing Valencia Province and was re-elected in the subsequent election in 1979.

In 1978 Muñoz was chosen as one of the members of the Spanish delegation in the Council of Europe later becoming President of the Spanish delegation and Vice-President of the council. He also worked as an advisor and promoter for the PRISA group, the largest publisher in Spain. Muñoz lost his seat in the 1982 General Election and died in Guinea in 1987, having earlier suffered a heart attack in 1979.

In 2008, Eduardo Zaplana, former President of the Valencian Community, stated that he "owed everything" to Muñoz. A street in the town of Foios is named in honour of Muñoz.
