= Carlos Manglano de Mas =

Spanish politician (born 1950)

Carlos Manglano de Mas (Valencia, Spain, 1950) is a Spanish politician who belongs to the People's Party (PP).

Married, with three children, Manglano qualified as an architect. His early political involvement came as a member of the Union of the Democratic Centre (UCD) which he joined in 1977. He left the party in 1979 and joined the Popular Alliance (AP) and in 1982 he was elected to the Spanish Congress of Deputies representing Valencia Province. He was re-elected in 1986 but was one of four Deputies who resigned from the AP in September of that year, citing disagreements with the AP leader Manuel Fraga. He joined the Liberal Party in 1988 and one year later that party merged with the AP and other right wing parties to form the current People's Party. Manglano did not stand at the 1989 election.
