= Alfonso Bañón =

Spanish politician (1930–2026)

Member of the Congress of Deputies for Navarre
- In office 18 December 1979 – 31 August 1982

Personal details
- Born: Alfonso Bañón Seijas; 8 August 1930 Valladolid, Spain
- Died: 19 March 2026 (aged 95) Pamplona, Spain
- Party: APN (1977–1978); UCD
- Education: University of Navarra; Technical University of Madrid
- Occupation: Engineer

Alfonso Bañón Seijas (8 August 1930 – 19 March 2026) was a Spanish politician. A member of the Agrupación Popular Navarra and the Union of the Democratic Centre, he served in the Congress of Deputies from 1979 to 1982.

Bañón died in Pamplona on 19 March 2026, at the age of 95.
