= Francisco Aguirre de la Hoz =

Spanish lawyer and politician

Francisco Aguirre de la Hoz (born 1943, in Ávila, Spain) is a Spanish lawyer and former politician.

After qualifying as a lawyer at the University of Valladolid and University of Valencia, together with Emilio Attard, he helped to found the Valencian Regional Party and later, the Democratic Popular Party (PDP). Subsequently, the PDP, together with other parties, formed the Union of the Democratic Centre (UCD). As a UCD member, at the 1977 General Election, he was elected to the Spanish Congress of Deputies representing Valencia Province and was re-elected in the subsequent election in 1979.

From April 1978 until June 1979 he served as Minister for Economics and Manufacturing in the Valencian Regional Administration. He did not stand at the 1982 election, retiring from politics and moving to Barcelona where he founded a Business Association.
