= Manuel Clavero =

Spanish politician and lawyer (1926–2021)

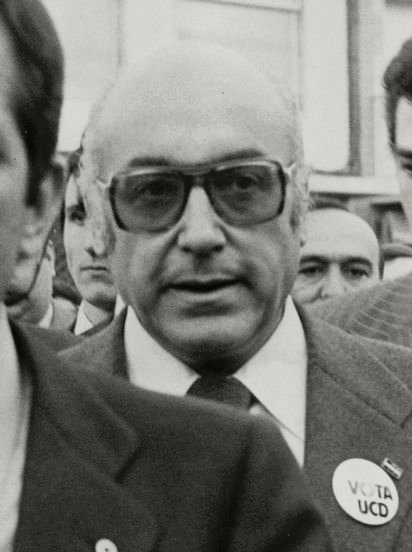

Minister of Culture
- In office 6 April 1979 – 17 January 1980
- Prime Minister: Adolfo Suárez
- Preceded by: Pío Cabanillas Gallas
- Succeeded by: Ricardo de la Cierva

Assistant Minister of the Regions
- In office 5 July 1977 – 6 April 1979
- Prime Minister: Adolfo Suárez
- Preceded by: Office established
- Succeeded by: Office disestablished

Personal details
- Born: Manuel Clavero Arévalo; 25 April 1926 Seville, Spain
- Died: 14 June 2021 (aged 95) Seville, Spain
- Party: Andalusian Unity
- Other political affiliations: UCD (1978–80); PSLA (1976–78)
- Education: University of Seville

Manuel Francisco Clavero Arévalo (25 April 1926 – 14 June 2021) was a Spanish lawyer and politician who as Assistant Minister of the Regions between July 1977 and April 1979 contributed to the construction of the current State of Autonomies in Spain. He also served as Minister of Culture from April 1979 to January 1980.

== Biography ==
Clavero was born on 25 April 1926 in Seville in a middle-class Catholic family. He studied Laws at the University of Seville. He then became professor of administrative law in that University and its Rector between 1971 and 1975. Among his students were Adolfo Suárez and Felipe González, who would become Spain's first democratically elected prime ministers.

== Political career ==
On 13 December 1976 he presented in Seville the Andalusian Social Liberal Party, the party he was leading that advocated for the regional autonomies, but not a federal state, at a time when the post-dictatorship territorial organization of Spain was being built.

On 23 February 1977 he met with Prime Minister Adolfo Suárez to present his party's views on nationalities to him.

Clavero was elected deputy in the first democratic elections of 1977, with the Suárez's UCD to which Clavero's party was integrated, representing Seville constituency.

=== Assistant Minister of the Regions ===
In July 1977 Prime Minister Adolfo Suárez appointed Clavero Assistant Minister of the Regions, appointment that he heard on the radio while playing tennis.

That day, in the call he had with the Prime Minister, Clavero announced that he would immediately call Josep Tarradellas, who was the president of the Generalitat de Catalunya in exile, to return from France to lead a restored Generalitat.

He was sworn in on 5 July 1977 and as assistant minister he had to develop the process of decentralization of power prior to the constitution of 1978 and the promotion of preautonomy of the various regions and nationalities of Spain.

In an interview on 9 September 1977, he made it clear that the new autonomies could not acquire competencies related to the army, international relations, currency and major public works, and that in any case the new constitution would determine which competencies would be transferable.

On 29 September 1977, Suárez government approved the two decrees approving the reestablishment of the Generalitat de Catalunya, decrees that Clavero read on television. In that communiqué, he announced that a pre-autonomy regime would be implemented for all regions, but did not specify which regions would be included.

At that time there were attempts to ensure that only the historic nationalities of Catalonia, the Basque Country and Galicia would have governments with full autonomy and their own parliaments, while the rest of the regions were to assume fewer ceded competencies, for example Andalusia. This idea prompted Clavero to coin the well-known quote "¡café para todos!" ("coffee for all!"), a formula that allowed those underprivileged regions to assume autonomy in the same way as the historic nationalities, because he did not accept that in Spain there were two different types of autonomous communities.

He was in charge of drafting Article 151 of the Constitution, which is the one that designs a special way to obtain self-government for a region. He wrote it at his home together with the co-father of the Constitution, Miguel Herrero y Rodríguez de Miñón. Clavero had obstacles for this article to be added to the constitution, as Suárez was opposed and it was not well seen that Andalusia should have the same rank of self-government as Catalonia or the Basque Country, but finally it was included in its entirety.

=== Minister of Culture and resignation ===
Manuel Clavero was named Minister of Culture in the first constitutional government under the leadership of Suárez and was sworn in on 6 April 1979.

Under his leadership of the Ministry, in September 1979 RTVE's Bylaws were approved by which Spanish public television and radio became a more democratic system, controlled by the Congress of Deputies and, in particular, gave the Autonomous Communities the possibility of creating regional channels, since they could directly manage a state-owned television channel for the territorial scope of each Autonomous Community.

In November of the same year he received in Barcelona the mortal remains of Pau Casals, who died in exile in 1973 and did not want to be buried in Spain until the return of democracy.

On 15 January 1980, the national executive committee of the UCD agreed that Andalusia had to assume autonomy through Article 143 of the recently approved constitution, and not through Article 151, which would allow Andalusia to achieve more self-government, a route advocated by Manuel Clavero. This, and together with his party's campaign to promote abstention on the 1980 Andalusian autonomy initiative referendum led to Clavero's resignation as minister, becoming the first minister of the democracy to do so. He was replaced in the post by Ricardo de la Cierva, who was sworn into office on the following day. It was then that he returned to Seville to participate in the "Yes" campaign in the referendum.

On 30 April he announced that he was leaving the UCD parliamentary group, joining the mixed group, and did not run in the 1982 general election.

== Later life and death ==
In December 1980 he presented Andalusian Unity, an "autonomist, interclassist and non-Marxist" party, but the party was dissolved on 27 November 1982 over a lack of political and economical viability.

After leaving national politics, he returned to the university to teach and to his law practice.

Manuel Clavero died on 14 June 2021 at the age of 95 in his home of Seville. His funeral chapel was opened in the Parliament of Andalusia the following day.

== Decorations ==
- Grand Cross of the Civil Order of Alfonso X, the Wise (1973).
- Grand Cross of the Order of Civil Merit (1975).
- Grand Cross of the Order of Charles III (1980).
- Hijo Predilecto de Andalucía (1999).
- Grand Cross of the Order of Saint Raymond of Peñafort (2001).
- Gold Medal of Merit in Labour (2004).
- Gold Medal of the Institute of Academies of Andalusia.
- In 2019, the Regional Government of Andalusia created a category of Medalla de Andalucía in his honor, for his contribution as "father of modern Andalusia".
