= María Izquierdo Rojo =

Spanish politician

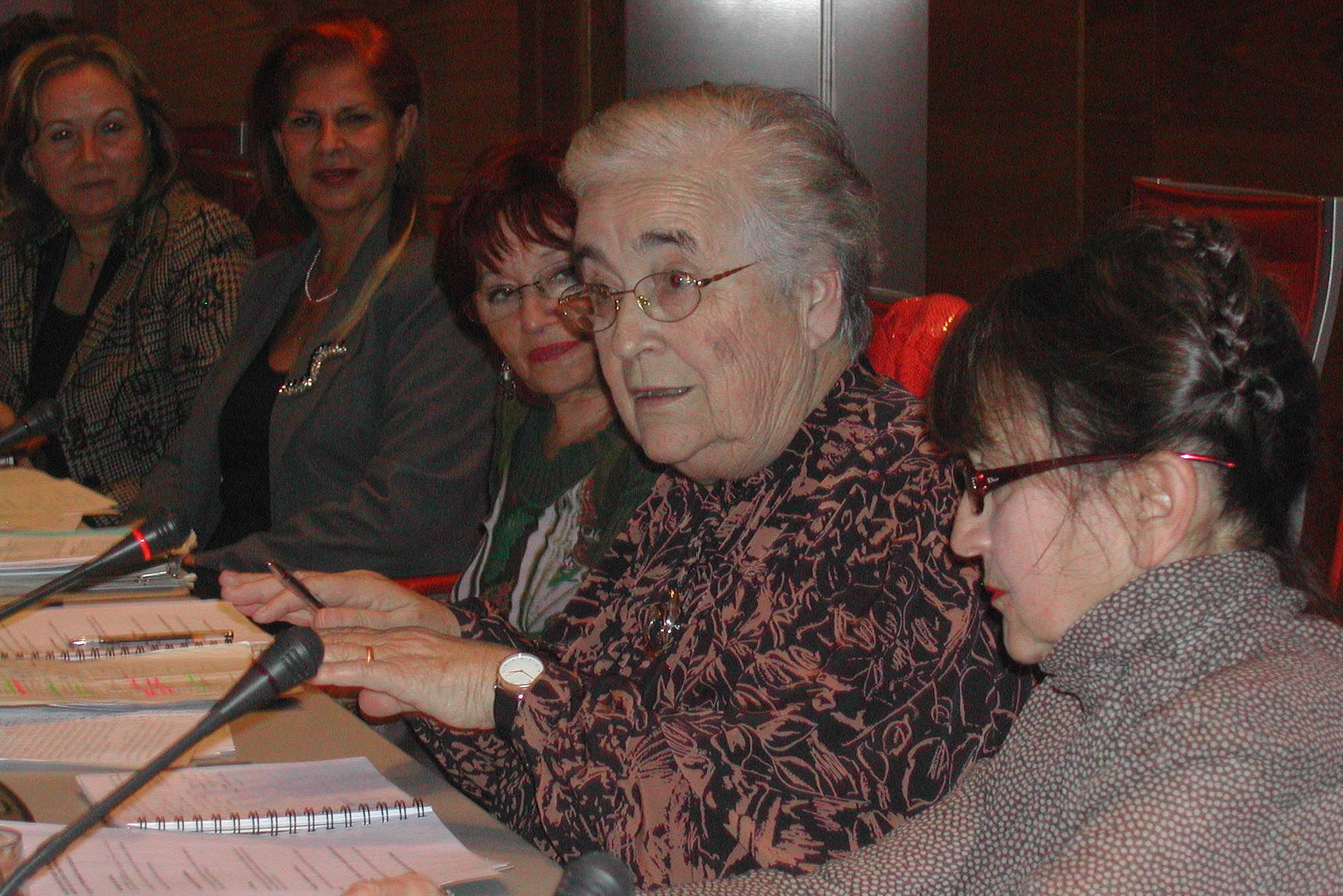
Izquierdo in 2006 at a reunion of members of the Constituent Congress 1977–79

María Izquierdo Rojo (born 13 September 1946 in Oviedo) is a Spanish politician of the Spanish Socialist Workers' Party (Partido Socialista Obrero Español (PSOE)). She was a member of the Spanish Congress of Deputies in 1977–1979 (the Constituent Congress), 1979–1982 (the 1st Congress) and 1986–1989 (the 3rd Congress), representing Granada. She was a member of the European Parliament from 1989 to 2004.

In 2018 she was one of a group of eleven women honoured by the city of Granada for having enabled the peaceful transition to democracy in the city forty years earlier. A conference was held entitled "Granadinas por la libertad: once figuras femeninas para la democracia española".

Speaking on television in 2018 she said "Me he pasado los cincuenta años primeros años de mi vida discriminada por ser mujer, y los siguientes haGranadinas por la libertad: once figuras femeninas para la democracia española"sta hoy discriminada por ser mayor" ("I have spent the first fifty years of my life discriminated against because I am a woman, and the following until today discriminated against because I am older").
