= Alberto Estella =

Spanish lawyer and politician (1940–2022)

Member of the Congress of Deputies
- In office 1977–1982

Personal details
- Born: 23 September 1940 Salamanca, Spain
- Died: 1 April 2022 (aged 81) Salamanca, Spain
- Party: UCD; PP
- Education: University of Salamanca

Alberto Estella Goytre (23 September 1940 – 1 April 2022) was a Spanish politician. A member of the Union of the Democratic Centre and the People's Party, he served in the Congress of Deputies from 1977 to 1982. He died in Salamanca on 1 April 2022 at the age of 81.
