= Ferrán Bono =

Spanish journalist and politician

Ferrán Bono Ara (11 December 1969, Valencia) is a Spanish journalist and politician for the Spanish Socialist Workers' Party (PSOE).

Bono comes from a political family as he is the son of Emérito Bono Martínez, a former Communist deputy for Valencia province. Unmarried, but a father of two daughters, Bono worked as a journalist. In early 2008, when the PSOE decided to look outside the party for a candidate to stand on their electoral list for Valencia, Bono was approached by the head of the list and deputy Prime Minister María Teresa Fernández de la Vega and agreed to stand. Placed fifth on the list in a region where the PSOE had won at least six seats at every election since the restoration of democracy in 1977, he was elected deputy in March 2008.
