= Julio Aguilar Azañón =

Spanish politician

- Born: 17 September 1934; Robledo, Spain
- Died: 29 December 2000 (aged 66); Granada, Spain
- Occupation: Politician
- Political party: Union of the Democratic Centre

Julio Aguilar Azañón (17 September 1934 – 29 December 2000) was a Spanish politician from the UCD. He served as a member of the Congress of Deputies in its first legislature.
