= Ferrando =

Ferrando is an Italian surname.

== Notable people ==
Notable people with the surname include:

- José Luis Adsuar Ferrando, Spanish politician
- Linda Ferrando, Italian tennis player
- Luigi Ferrando, Italian bishop
- Marco Ferrando, Italian politician
- Martín Ferrando, Uruguayan footballer
- Rafael Ferrando, Spanish astronomer
- Salvador Ferrando, Mexican painter
- Stephen Ferrando, Italian missionary
