= Juan Pastor Marco =

Spanish politician (1951–2020)

Juan Pastor Marco (24 November 1951 – 11 August 2020) was a Spanish politician for the Spanish Socialist Workers' Party (PSOE).

After graduating in Economic Sciences, Pastor joined the PSOE in 1974 and at the 1977 General Election he was elected to the Spanish Congress of Deputies representing Valencia Province.

He then served as Secretary General of the PSOE in the Valencian Community from 1978 to 1979. On the left of the party, he was a critic of the more centrist policies pursued by José Luis Albiñana Olmos, the first President of the Valencian Government, the Valencian regional administration. He was re-elected to Congress at the 1979 General Election. In 1980 he again attempted to become PSOE Secretary General in Valencia, running on a platform critical of the regional leadership but lost to Joan Lerma. He did not stand at the 1982 General Election.
