= Josep Pujadas Domingo =

Spanish Catalan jurist, lawyer and politician (1931–2025)

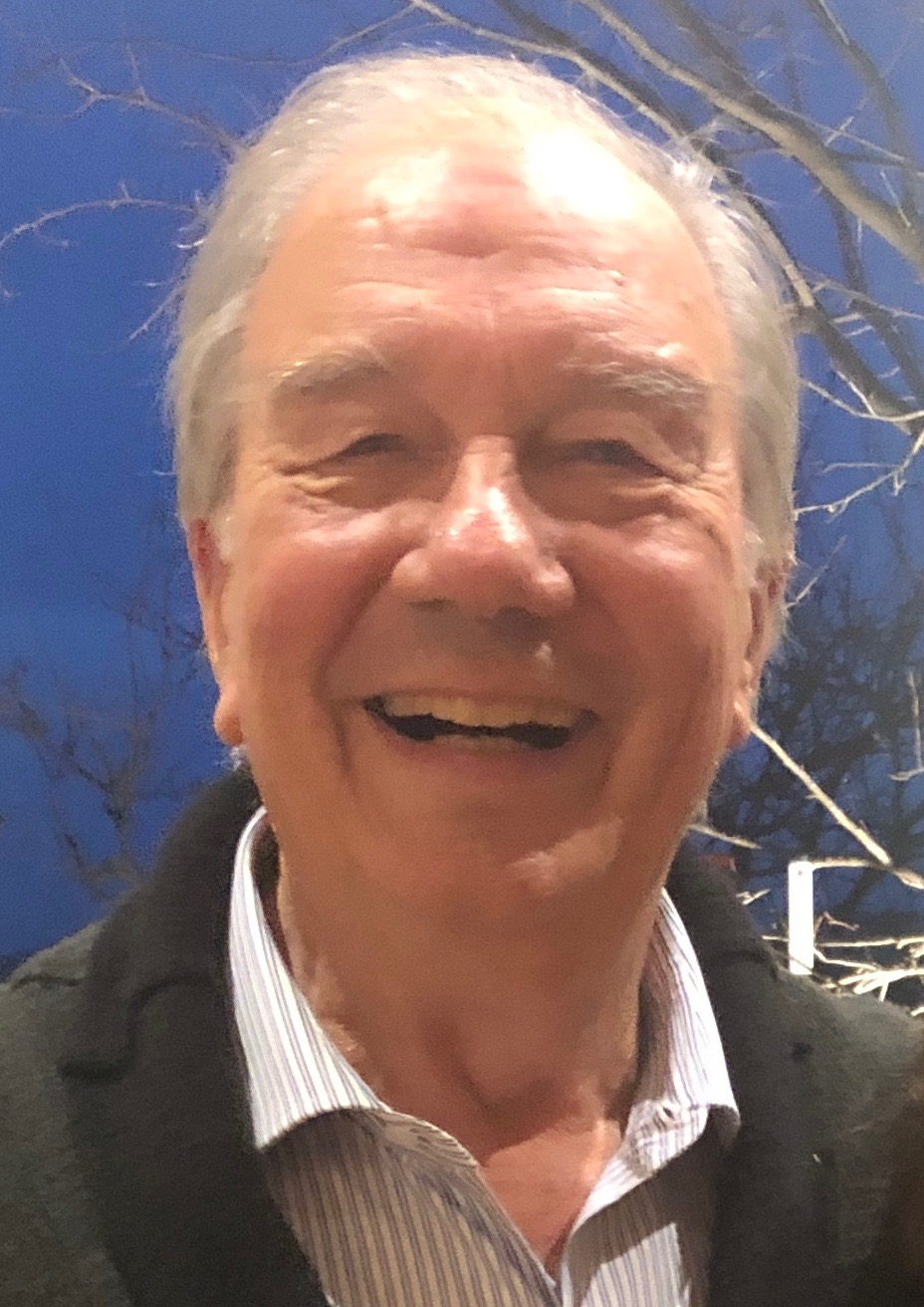
Pujadas in 2019

Josep Pujadas Domingo (6 April 1931 – 7 October 2025) was a Spanish Catalan lawyer politician and businessman who was a member of the first democratic legislature of the Congress of Deputies representing Barcelona from 27 March 1980 to 31 August 1982.

Pujadas was witness of the 1981 Spanish coup d'état attempt. He was also CEO of PJM Pujadas, S.A., a privately held manufacturer of specialised adhesives founded by his great-grandfather.

== Early life ==
Born in Barcelona on 6 April 1931, Pujadas obtained a degree on law, then a business degree from the International Graduate School of Management (IESE) at the University of Navarra. He became Secretary General of the Spanish Committee of the LECE (European League for Economic Cooperation). In 1964 he was founding president of the Spanish Youth Chamber and, in 1971, Executive Vice President of the World Federation of Youth Chambers. He was a member of the executive committee of the "Centristes de Catalunya (CC–UCD)" and was President of the Provincial Executive Committee of Barcelona.

In 1953, he joined the family business, PJM Pujadas, S.A. He studied marketing in the United States. While in the US, he negotiated licensing to make specialized adhesives and techniques used in the manufacture of cigarettes, including the filters, packages, seals and the wrapper and box. This led to Pujadas building a new factory in Barcelona in 1966 for this purpose, creating a new direction for the company. As of 2010, Pujadas has become a global supplier of industrial adhesives and processes used to make packaging for foods, beverages, pharmaceuticals, textiles and other applications, using the slogan (for English-speaking clients) "What Can We Glue For You?"

== Political career ==
Pujadas was member of Centrists of Catalonia and became member of the Congress of Deputies for Barcelona province in 1980 to succeed Anton Cañellas, an office he held until 1982 when was not re-elected in that year general election.

On 23 February 1981, Pujadas was at the Congress of Deputies in Madrid when a military group of 200 of the Guardia Civil attempted a coup d'état by storming into the building and locking themselves in with virtually the entire political leadership of the country. Pujadas was one of 350 members of parliament held hostage for about 17 hours. The coup attempt ended when King Juan Carlos, denounced the attempt in a nationally televised address. The ministers and deputies emerged one by one from their all night ordeal in the Parliament building shouting "Long Live Freedom".

== Death ==
Pujadas Domingo died on 7 October 2025, at the age of 94.
