= Luis García Forcada =

Spanish chemist, politician and businessman

Luis García Forcada is a Spanish chemist, politician and businessman.

García graduated in Chemical Sciences at the University of Valencia and then worked as Director General of the company Rodaval. At the 1982 General Election where he was elected to the Spanish Congress of Deputies representing Valencia Province in the lists of the Popular Alliance. In Congress he served as second secretary in the Committee for External Affairs. He did not stand at the 1986 election.
