= Manuel Sánchez Ayuso =

Spanish economist and politician

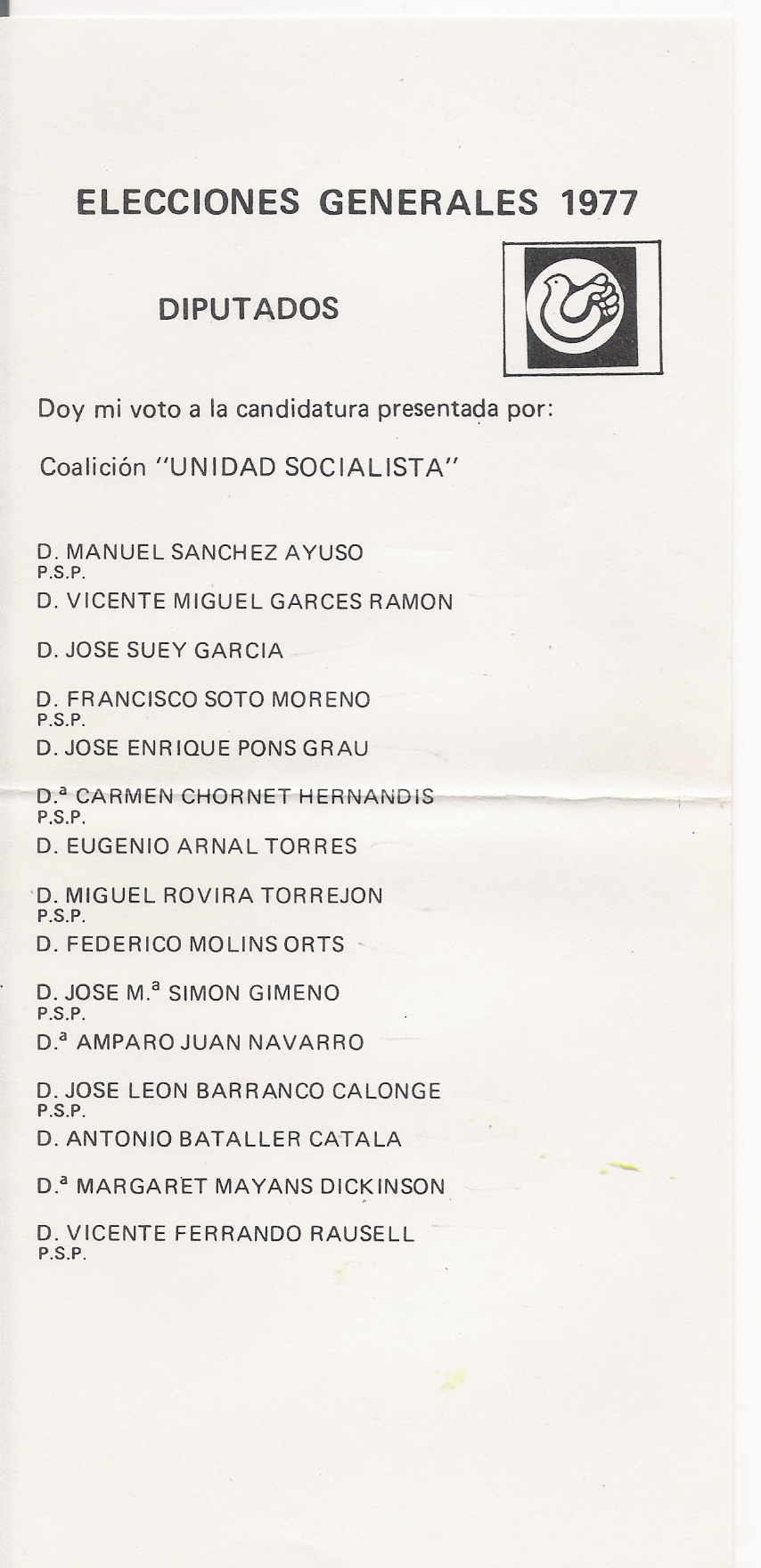

Manuel Sánchez Ayuso (Murcia, Spain, 1941 – Valencia, Spain 8 November 1982) was a Spanish economist and politician in the Spanish Socialist Workers' Party (PSOE) and Popular Socialist Party.

After gaining a degree in Law from the University of Valencia, he gained a Doctorate in Economics from the University of Madrid. Subsequently, from 1970, he held the chair in Political Economy at the University of Bilbao and then, from 1972, at the University of Valencia. He also worked as an economist for the Bank of Spain.

His earliest political involvement came with the PSP, in which he served on the national executive committee. In 1977 he stood in the first democratic elections since the death of the caudillo Francisco Franco as a candidate for the Spanish Congress of Deputies, heading the PSP list in Valencia Province and was elected to Congress.

From April 1978 to June 1979 he served as Minister for Health and Social Security in the regional government of the Valencian Community.

The PSP merged with the PSOE in 1978 and at the 1979 General Election he retained his seat in Valencia Province. In the PSOE, he was regarded as the head of a sub-sector known as the Socialist Left.

For the 1982 General Election he was again placed third on the PSOE list and was elected but died 11 days after the election before he could be sworn in as deputy. His death was the result of heart problems.
