= Enrique Sánchez de León =

Spanish politician (1934–2025)

- Sánchez de León Pérez presenting his biography in 2022

Minister of Health and Social Security
- In office 5 July 1977 – 6 April 1979
- Prime Minister: Adolfo Suárez
- Preceded by: Office established
- Succeeded by: Juan Rovira Tarazona

Personal details
- Born: Enrique Sánchez de León Pérez; 9 June 1934 Badajoz, Spain
- Died: 5 April 2025 (aged 90) Badajoz, Spain
- Party: UCD
- Other political affiliations: AREX (1976–1978)
- Education: Complutense University of Madrid

Enrique Sánchez de León Pérez (9 June 1934 – 5 April 2025) was a Spanish politician from the Union of the Democratic Centre (UCD) who served as Minister of Health and Social Security from July 1977 to April 1979. From 1977 to 1978 he was also the secretary-general of Extremaduran Regional Action. Sánchez de León died in Badajoz on 5 April 2025, at the age of 90.
