= Rafael Ballesteros =

Rafael Ballesteros Durán
- Born: October 7, 1938; Málaga, Spain
- Education: University of Granada
- Occupations: Poet, writer, politician

Rafael Ballesteros Durán (born 7 October 1938 in Málaga) is a Spanish poet, writer, and politician. He earned a degree in Philosophy and Literature from the University of Granada, and worked as a high school professor of Language and Literature. He is a member of the Real Academia de Nobles Artes de Antequera and of the Ateneo de Málaga.

== Political career ==
Ballesteros served as a member of the Congress of Deputies for the Málaga constituency representing the Spanish Socialist Workers' Party (PSOE) during the Constituent Legislature and five legislatures in the Congress of Deputies from 1977 to 1996. He was also President of the Congress Commission on Education and Culture between 1982 and 1996.

== Literary career ==
Ballesteros has published literary criticism on the poetry of authors such as Carriedo, M. Labordeta, Pérez Estrada, Vicente Núñez, Ricardo Molina, Moreno Villa, and Muñoz Rojas, in journals including Ínsula, Cuadernos Hispanoamericanos, Papeles de Son Armadans, and Camp de L’Arpa.

He is the author of several poetry collections, including:

- Las contracifras (El Bardo, 1969)
- Testamenta (Visor, 1992)
- Los dominios de la emoción (Pre-Textos, 2003)

Between 1983 and 2002 he published the four volumes of his long poem Jacinto. His poetry has been translated into French, Arabic, Romanian, English, Hungarian and Italian.

Ballesteros is also the author of several novels, among them:

- La imparcialidad del viento (Veramar, 2003)
- Huerto místico (Centro Cultural de la Generación del 27, 2005)
- Amor de mar (Renacimiento, Premio Rincón de la Victoria de Novela Corta)
- Cuentos americanos (Ateneo de Málaga, 2006)
- Los últimos días de Thomas de Quincey (DVD Editores, finalist for the Premio Andalucía de la Crítica)
- La muerte tiene la cara azul (RD Editores, 2009), which won the Premio Andalucía de la Crítica in 2010.
