= Margarita Pin =

Spanish politician

Margarita Pin Arboledas (born 18 March 1949 in Valencia, Spain) is a Spanish politician who belongs to the governing Spanish Socialist Workers' Party (PSOE).

Married with three children, Pin first worked as a social worker and also worked for the Valencian regional administration before entering politics in 1995 when she was elected as a councillor for Sagunto and also served as a member of the Valencian Regional assembly from 1995 to 1996. She entered national politics in 1996 when she was elected to the Congress of Deputies as a deputy for Valencia. For the 2000 election she was placed lower down the PSOE list in seventh place in a district where the party had won only six seats at the previous election. With the PSOE failing to gain a seat she consequently lost her seat but returned to the Congress in June 2003 as a substitute candidate. She was re-elected in 2004 and was the most active PSOE deputy in the three Valencian provinces in the first 21 months of the Congress being credited with 346 legislative interventions. Despite this, for the 2008 election she was placed ninth on the PSOE list (the party had won seven seats at the 2004 election) effectively deselecting her as the party was unable to gain any seats in that election. With the replacement of Inmaculada Rodríguez-Piñero by José Luís Ábalos Meco in April 2009, she is currently first in line to substitute any PSOE deputy for Valencia Province who resigns or dies.
