= People's Party (Spain, 1976) =

Defunct political party in Spain

People's Party Partido Popular
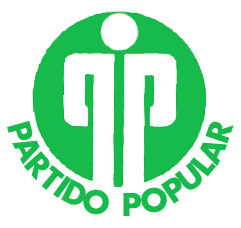
- Leader: Pío Cabanillas Gallas; José María de Areilza
- Founded: 15 September 1976
- Dissolved: 12 December 1977
- Merged into: UCD
- Ideology: Reformism; Liberal conservatism
- Political position: Centre-right to right-wing
- National affiliation: UCD

People's Party (Spanish: Partido Popular; PP) was a Spanish liberal conservative political party, founded in 1976. The leaders of the PP were Pío Cabanillas Gallas and José María de Areilza.

== History ==
The party was founded through the merge of 7 regional parties:

- Extremaduran People's Party: led by Rodríguez Requera and Luis Ramallo García.
- People's Party of Catalonia
- Valencian Regional Autonomist People's Party: led by Emilio Attard Alonso, J. Aguirre de la Hoz and J. R. Pin Arboledas.
- People's Party of Ourense: led by Eulogio Gómez Franqueira, E. Reverter, J. A. Trillo, J. Quiroga Suárez y J. Rodríguez Reza.
- Aragonese People's Party: led by León J. Buil and César Escribano.
- Alicantine Autonomous People's party: led by J. María Pérez Hikman, Antonio Espinosa and Ramón Sancho.
- Balearic People's Party: led by R. Ciar Garau and Francisco Gari.

The majority of the members of the party were members of the reformist wing of the Francoist Regime, that wanted a "controlled" and moderate democratic transition.

The PP joined the Union of the Democratic Centre (UCD) in 1977, gaining 32 seats in the 1977 Spanish general election. The party was dissolved in February 1978, fully joining the UCD.
