= José María de Areilza, Count of Motrico =

Spanish politician, engineer and ambassador

The Most Excellent The Count of Motrico
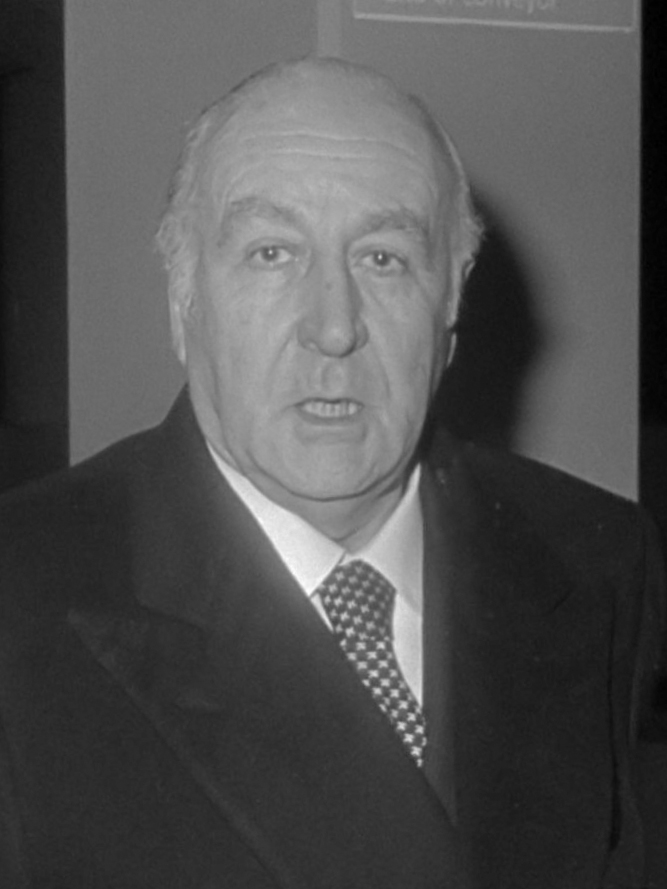
- de Areilza in 1976

President of the Parliamentary Assembly of the Council of Europe
- In office 1981–1983
- Vice President: Gerard Batliner
- Preceded by: Hans de Koster
- Succeeded by: Karl Ahrens

Member of the Congress of Deputies For Madrid
- In office 1979–1982

Minister of Foreign Affairs
- In office 11 December 1975 – 7 July 1976
- Preceded by: Pedro Cortina Mauri
- Succeeded by: Marcelino Oreja

Ambassador of Spain to France
- In office 1960–1964
- Preceded by: José Rojas Moreno
- Succeeded by: The Count of Casa Miranda

Ambassador of Spain in the United States
- In office 1954–1960
- Preceded by: José Félix de Lequerica y Erquiza
- Succeeded by: Mariano de Yturralde y Orbegoso

Ambassador of Spain to Argentina
- In office 1947–1950
- Preceded by: José Muñoz de Vargas
- Succeeded by: Emilio de Navasqüés y Ruiz de Velasco

Mayor of Bilbao
- In office June 1937 – February 1938
- Preceded by: Ernesto Ercoera
- Succeeded by: José María González de Careaga y Urquijo

Seat G of the Real Academia Española
- In office 10 December 1987 – 22 February 1998
- Preceded by: Manuel Díez-Alegría
- Succeeded by: José Hierro (Note: Hierro was elected for the position in 1999 but never took the seat)

Personal details
- Born: 3 August 1909 Portugalete, Spain
- Died: 22 February 1998 (aged 88) Madrid, Spain
- Occupation: Politician
- Profession: Lawyer

José María de Areilza y Martínez-Rodas, Count of Motrico (3 August 1909, in Portugalete, Vizcaya – 22 February 1998, in Madrid) was a Spanish politician, engineer and diplomat.

During the Spanish Civil War he became mayor of the city of Bilbao in 1938. Between 1947 and 1964 he served as Spanish Ambassador to Buenos Aires, Washington DC and Paris. In 1964 he resigned from his office and was asked by Infante Juan, Count of Barcelona —the King in exile— to lead the monarchist opposition to dictator Francisco Franco, as Secretary-General of his Private Council.

Between 1975 and 1976 he was the first minister of foreign affairs of the new King Juan Carlos I. In 1976, along with Pío Cabanillas, he founded the short-lived People's Party, which later became part of the UCD, although he left after disagreements with Adolfo Suárez. In 1979 he was elected to the Congress of Deputies for Madrid district for the Democratic Coalition. In 1981 he became President of the Parliamentary Assembly of the Council of Europe and, in 1987, he was elected member of the Spanish Royal Academy. He wrote over 3000 newspaper articles and 12 books. His wife died in 1991.
