= Blas Camacho =

Spanish lawyer and deputy (1939–2021)

Blas Camacho Zancada (1939 – 27 January 2021) was a Spanish politician who served as a Deputy (1977–1982, 1986–1993).

He died of COVID-19 on 27 January 2021, in Madrid during the COVID-19 pandemic in Spain.
