= Manuel Gallent Nicola =

Spanish politician and lawyer

Manuel Gallent Nicola is a lawyer and Spanish politician.

After receiving a degree in International Law from the University of Valladolid, he entered politics, becoming a member of the Democratic Popular Party (PDP) and in 1982 was elected to the Spanish Congress of Deputies representing Valencia Province as part of an electoral alliance between the PDP and the Popular Alliance. During this period he served as President of the PDP and concerned himself with international human rights issues. In December 1984 he left the PDP and sat as an independent in the Spanish Congress as part of the mixed group. He did not stand at the 1986 election.
