= Adela Pla Pastor =

Spanish politician (1938–2005)

Adela Pla Pastor (1938 – 16 August 2005, Sedaví, Spain) was a Spanish politician for the Spanish Socialist Workers' Party. (PSOE)

Married, with two daughters, she was the daughter of Vicent Pla, the last Mayor of Sedaví in the Spanish Republican era. Pla joined the PSOE in 1976 and was a minister without portfolio in the preautonomous government of the Valencian Community between June and December 1979. She was selected as a PSOE candidate in the 1979 General Election, being placed eighth on the PSOE list. The party had won seven seats at the previous election, increasing to eight following a merger with the smaller Popular Socialist Party, but the party won just seven seats in the election and Pla failed to be elected. However, as first substitute, she became an MP one year later in February 1980 following the resignation of José Luis Albiñana Olmos, thus becoming the first female MP for Valencia Province in the modern democratic era. She was re-elected in the four subsequent elections in 1982, 1986, 1989 and 1993. She also served as part of the Spanish delegation to the Council of Europe from 1982 to 1987.

After leaving politics, Pla returned to her previous jobs as a teacher and a justice of the peace in her native Sedaví. She died of cancer on 16 August 2005.
