= Francisco Aguirre-Velasquez =

Activist

- Born: El Salvador
- Other name: Francisco Aguirre
- Occupations: Political activist, day laborer
- Years active: 1996-present
- Organization: Portland VOZ Worker's Education Project
- Spouse: Dora Aguirre
- Children: Denis Moises Escalante Aguirre

Francisco Aguirre-Velasquez is an activist for the rights of workers and immigrants in Portland, Oregon, United States. He is originally from El Salvador, but fled the country due to military violence against his family. He has fought for the rights of laborers in both Los Angeles, California and Portland for over 25 years. He was one of the founding members of the Portland organization, Portland VOZ Worker's Education Project, and currently works as the center coordinator for their NE Portland location.

When living in El Salvador, as a child, most of his family left the country as refugees without him. he was kidnapped for around one year by the military, until they torturing him and trying to make him believe that they got his uncle and that he must shut him, but they never let him see the face of the men who was claiming to be his uncle, he believed that the man was not his uncle, and the handgun they give him was without bullets to shoot his uncle. After all that, he was rescued and he sought refuge at Guazapa hill with members of the Farabundo Martí National Liberation Front.

== #UnidosConFrancisco ==
In 2014, Immigration and Customs Enforcement attempted to detain and arrest Francisco. He sought sanctuary in the Augustana Lutheran Church, which is part of the sanctuary movement. The Department of Justice then charged Francisco for illegally reentering the United States.

After he left the church, the Department of Homeland Security began harassing them about food stamps. His eldest son, Denis Moises, commonly referred to by peers as simply Moises, traumatized by the continued harassment against his family by various government agencies and local law enforcement, flew back to El Salvador in July 2015. A few months later, on February 2, 2016, Francisco was informed that Moises, 19, had been murdered, allegedly by two gunmen who were ordered to kill him.

After several protests and vigils, using the hashtag and slogan #UnidosConFrancisco (English: United With Francisco), the charges were dropped on June 17 of 2016, which is just two months after his trial began on April 19. However, he is still in conflict with ICE.

Francisco applied for a U-Visa which was denied and now he is in the process to get political asylum. He has to report to ICE whenever they ask him, and he is not sure to get the asylum.

Francisco was persecuted in his country because of his political beliefs. and his life is in danger if he is deported to El Salvador, where he could end up getting killed like his son.
