= Ignacio Gallego =

Spanish politician (1914–1990)

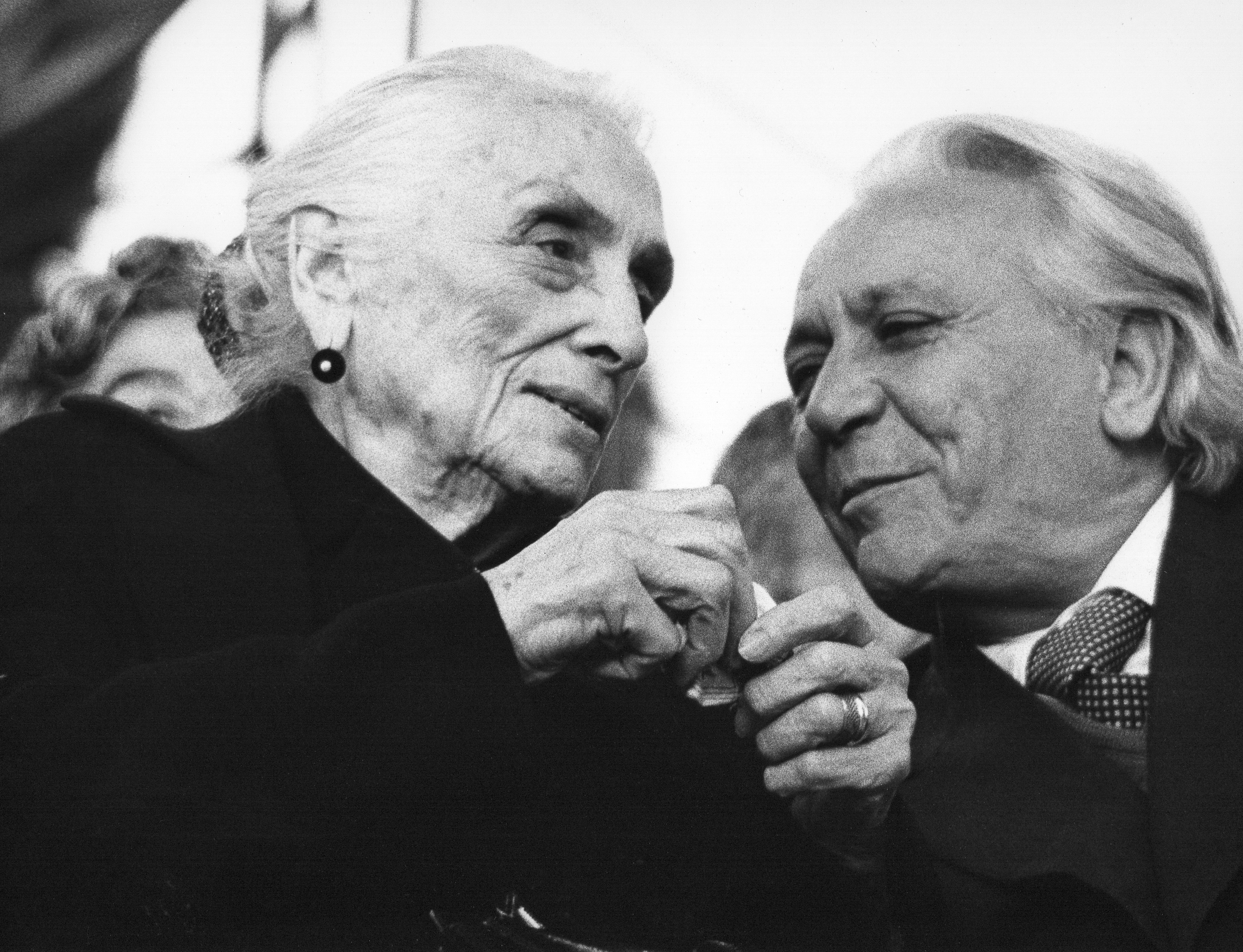
Dolores Ibárruri talks with Ignacio Gallego on the closing day of the PCE 1978 party, Casa de Campo

Ignacio Gallego Bezares (1914–1990) was a Spanish communist politician, General Secretary of the Communist Party of the Peoples of Spain (PCPE).

== Biography ==
Born in Siles, Jaén Province, Spain, Gallego fought on the Republican side in the Spanish Civil War. When Francisco Franco won, Gallego fled and was put in a refugee camp in then French-ruled Algeria. Later, he made his way to the Soviet Union, where he lived until 1945.

Gallego secretly returned to Spain in 1976 and made his first public appearance in the country on the day the PCE was legalised (25 April 1977). He lived in Madrid and was elected to the Congress of Deputies for the district of Cordoba in the general elections of 1977 and 1979.

Gallego formed the Marxist-Leninist and pro-Soviet Communist Party of the Peoples of Spain after the mainstream PCE fragmented in the wake of an electoral rout in 1982.

He died in Madrid. The writer Rubén Gallego is his grandson.
