= José Vida Soria =

Spanish jurist and politician (1937–2019)

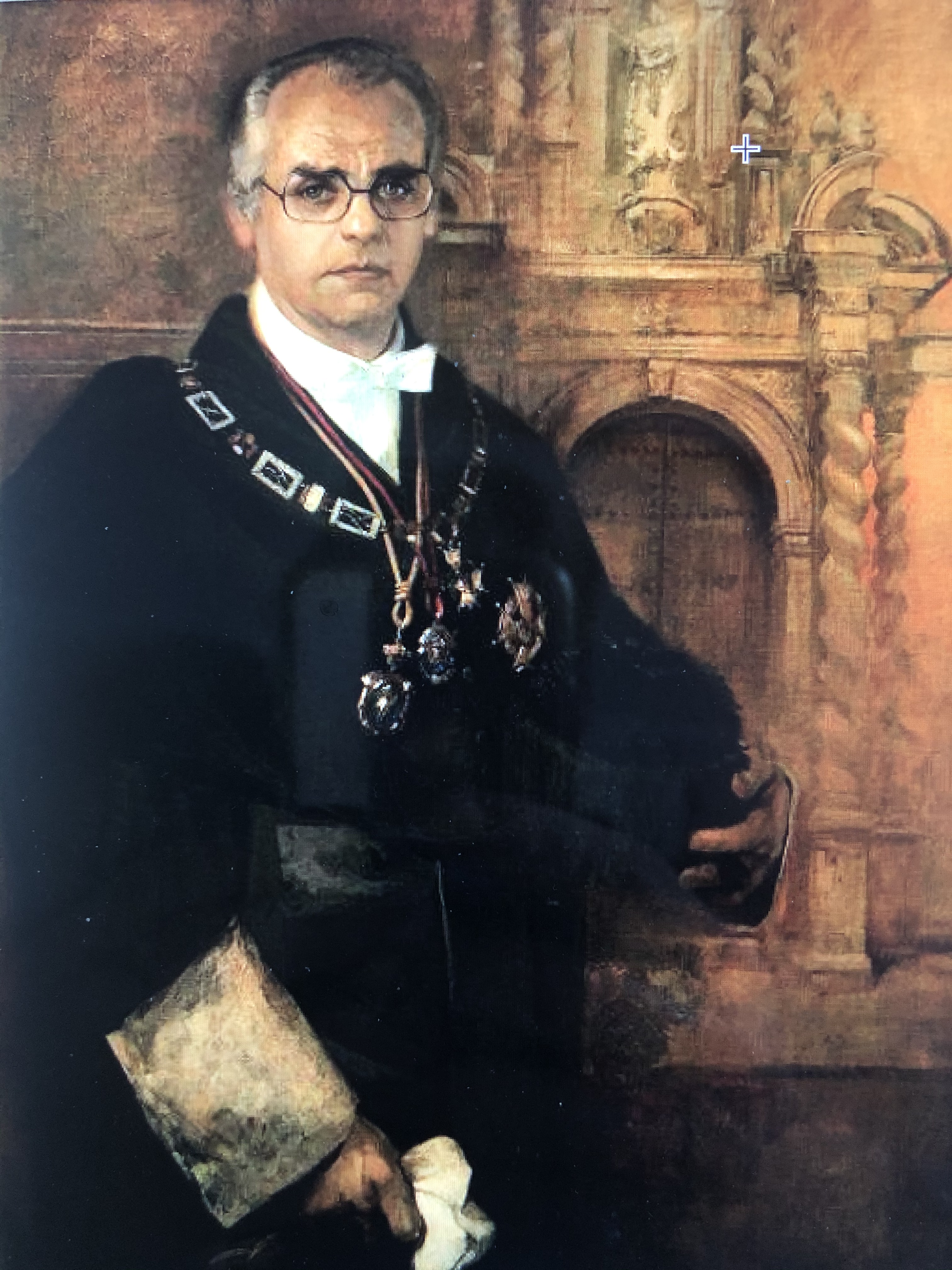
José Vida Soria

José Vida Soria (19 September 1937 – 3 January 2019) was a Spanish jurist and politician.

== Early life ==
Vida was born in Granada on 19 September 1937. He taught law at the University of Granada prior to his political career. Vida joined the Spanish Socialist Workers' Party in 1974 and represented the party in Granada during the constituent and first Congress of Deputies between 1977 and 1982. He was outside Madrid when he learned of the 1981 Spanish coup d'état attempt, and he decided to enter the congressional chambers while it was taken by the Civil Guards, knowing the risk of dying, as one of the guards told him. Vida subsequently returned to the University of Granada, serving as rector from 1984 to 1989. He was awarded the Order of Constitutional Merit and the Order of St. Raymond of Peñafort.

Vida was being treated for pneumonia at the Campus de la salud, when he was diagnosed with cancer. He died on 3 January 2019, aged 81. Vida was buried at the San Jose municipal cemetery the next day.
