= Emérito Bono Martínez =

Spanish academic and politician

Emérito Bono Martínez (Catalan: Emerit Bono Martinez; born 1940 in Sagunto, Spain) is a Spanish academic and politician for the Spanish Socialist Workers' Party (PSOE), although he previously belonged to the Communist Party of Spain (PCE).

Married with three children, Bono graduated in Economic Science at the University of Barcelona. He joined the PCE in 1966 while at the same time maintaining his link with the Roman Catholic Church. During the dictatorship of Francisco Franco he worked for the restoration of democracy in his native Valencian Community.

At the 1977 General Election he headed the PCE list in Valencia Province and was elected to the Spanish Congress of Deputies. He was re-elected in the subsequent election in 1979.

From April to June 1978 he was Minister for Transport and Social Welfare in the pre-autonomous Government of the Valencian Community, which was responsible for local affairs in the Valencian region prior to full devolution of powers. He also sat on Valencia city council from 1983 to 1987.

From 1984 to 1986 he was Vice-rector of the University of Valencia where he lectured in politics and economics.

In 1989 he left the PCE and joined the PSOE and in September of that year he was named Minister for Public Administration in the Valencia region by the Valencian President Joan Lerma. He held that position until July 1993 when he became Environment Minister in Valencia region, retaining that position until the PSOE defeat in the 1995 Valencian elections.

His son, Ferrán Bono was elected for Valencia as a PSOE member in the 2004 General Election and 2008 General Elections.

== Published works ==
- La Banca al País Valencià (1973)
- Trasvase del Ebro y Comunidad Valenciana (2005)
- Chapter 24:Spanish regional and environmental policy, Economía y política regional en España ante la Europa del siglo XXI By José María Mella Márquez
