= Enrique Monsonís =

Spanish politician

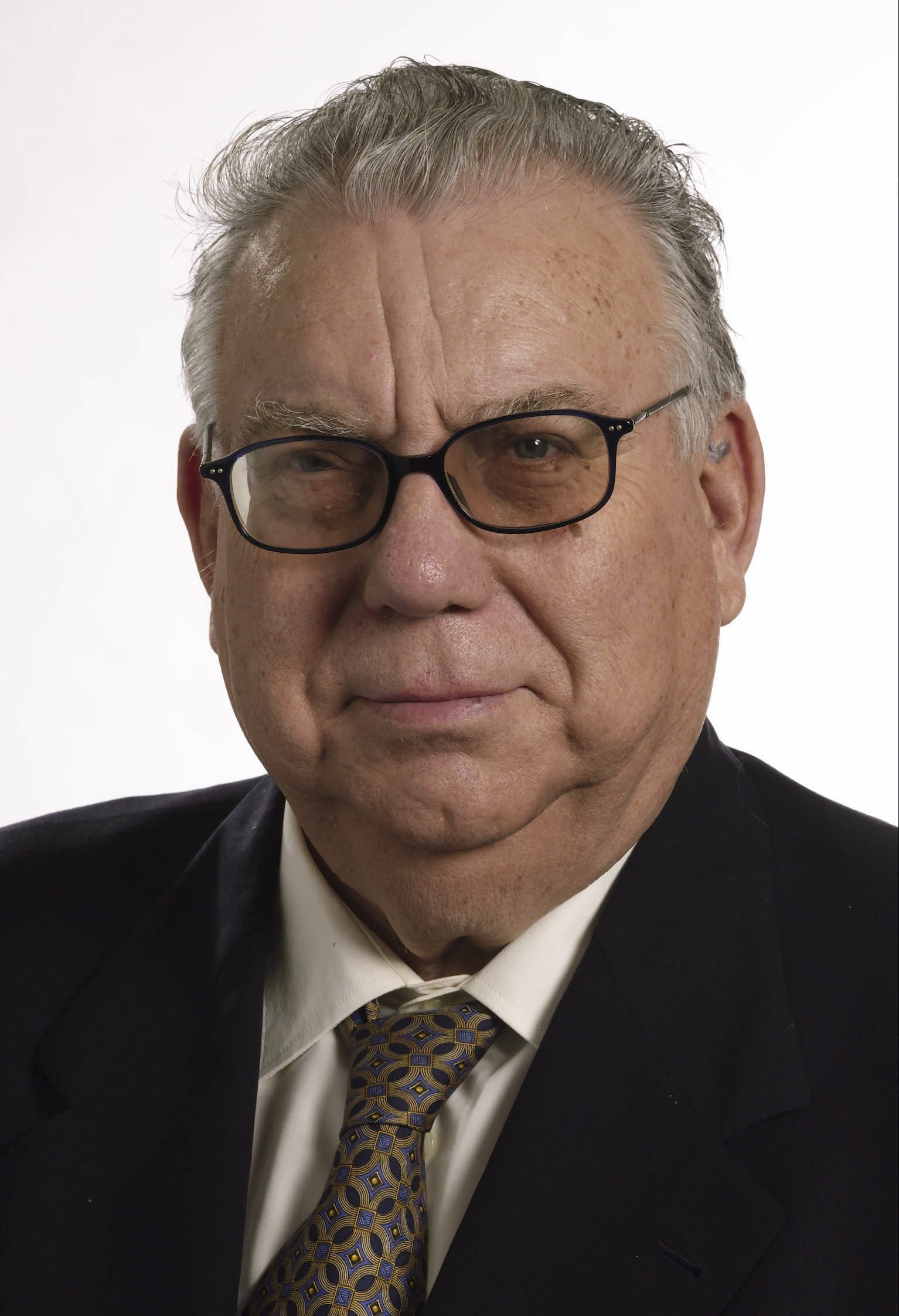
Monsonís in 1999

Enric Monsonís Domingo (June 28, 1931 – October 7, 2011) was a Spanish liberal politician. Monsonís served as the head of the pre-autonomous government of the Consell Pre-autonòmic del País Valencià (Pre-autonomous Council of the Valencian Country) from 1979 to 1982. He left office in 1982 when Valencia became an autonomous community of Spain, known as the Valencian Community, and elected its first democratically chosen President of the Valencian Government, Joan Lerma as part of the country's transition to democracy.

Monsonis was born in Burriana, Valencia, Spain, the son of an orange merchant. He obtained a law degree from the University of Valencia. He moved to Frankfurt, West Germany, in 1954 for the orange export industry, where he handled 2% of Spain's exports to the country.

Monsonis joined the Union of the Democratic Centre (UCD). He chaired the pre-autonomous government of Valencia from 1979 to 1982 until elections were held in 1982 as part of the transition to democracy. Monsonís was succeeded by Joan Lerma of the PSOE, who was elected President of the Valencian Government in the 1982 election.

Monsonís attempted a political comeback in 2004 as a member of the Valencian Union. However, he was unsuccessful and largely retired from public life thereafter.

Monsonis died in his hometown of Burriana, Plana Baixa, Valencian Community, on October 7, 2011, at the age of 80.
