= Papeles de Son Armadans =

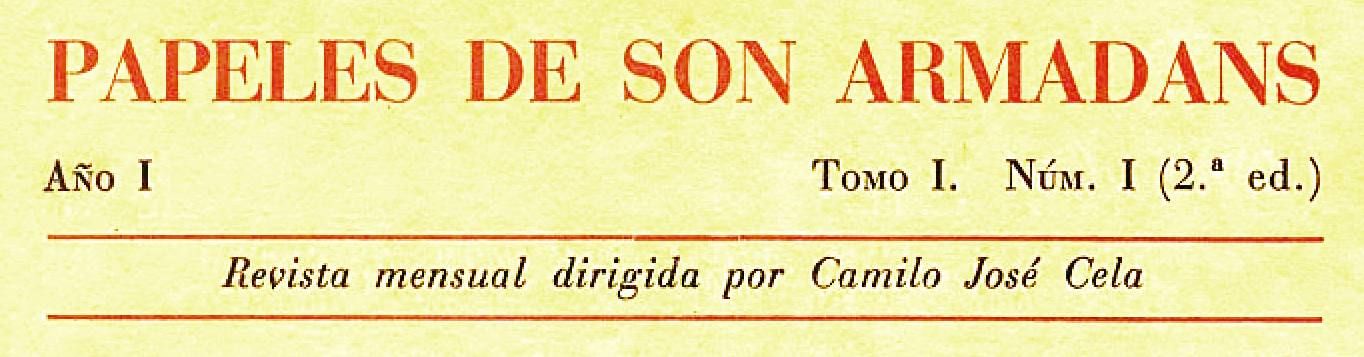
- Editor: Camilo José Cela
- Categories: Literary magazine
- Frequency: Monthly
- Founded: 1956
- Final issue: March 1979
- Country: Spain
- Based in: Madrid / Palma de Mallorca
- Language: Spanish

Papeles de Son Armadans (1956–1979) was a Spanish literary magazine founded and directed by writer Camilo José Cela. It was initially based in Palma de Mallorca and later also in Madrid.

The magazine became an important platform for contemporary Spanish literature, publishing works by leading authors of the time, including Dámaso Alonso, José María Castellet, Rafael Sánchez Ferlosio, and writers of the Republican exile such as Rafael Alberti, Luis Cernuda, and Max Aub. It was also notable for publishing texts in Spain’s vernacular languages and for special issues featuring writers and artists such as Antonio Machado, María Zambrano, Pablo Picasso, and Joan Miró.

A total of 276 monthly issues were published between April 1956 and March 1979, when the magazine ceased publication for economic reasons.

In 1995, Cela launched El Extramundi y los papeles de Iria Flavia, conceived as a spiritual successor to Papeles de Son Armadans.
