= Gerardo Bujanda Sarasola =

Spanish politician (1919–2019)

Gerardo Bujanda Sarasola (25 August 1919 – 4 September 2019) was a Spanish politician who served as a Deputy between 1977 and 1982.
