= Nuno Manuel Gavina do Couto =

Portuguese radio voice and producer (born 1969)

Nuno M. Gavina
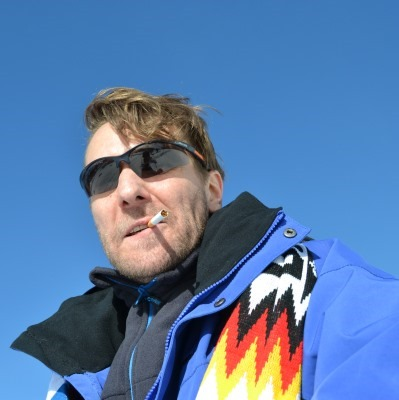
- Holmenkollen Biathlon World Cup 2013
- Born: Nuno Manuel Gavina do Couto; November 20, 1969 (age 55); Lisbon, Portugal
- Citizenship: Portuguese
- Occupations: Radio voice; producer
- Known for: OR2 Streams
- Website: oslorevival.net

Nuno Manuel Gavina do Couto (Portuguese pronunciation: [ˈnunu mɐˈnuɛl ɣɐˈvinɐ ðu ˈkotu]; born November 20, 1969) is a Portuguese radio personality, producer, and owner of OR2 Web Productions (based legally in Høvik, Norway). Gavina do Couto developed a network composed of 21 Online Systems, which broadcasts audio and visual streams, known as OR2 Multimedia Streams.

== Early life ==
Gavina do Couto grew up in Sintra, Portugal, with his family. He was raised Roman Catholic, but is now a member of the Church of Norway.

== Radio ==
Between 1985 and 1989, Gavina do Couto produced and developed several radio programs on Portuguese local radio stations.

In 1990, the Radio program 'H2POP' returned to Sintra. Gavina do Couto was also co-responsible for the production of 'Good Morning Sintra', both transmitted by SINTRA FM RADIO Station.

== Career ==
From 1989, Gavina do Couto worked with his father, initially as a collaborator of the Club of Micro Computers in Portugal, with a registered brand called ClubeMicro, represented by C.M.U. - Informatic, Electronic & Telecommunications, Lda and T.M.S.I. - Technology, Maintenance and Computer Systems Security. In 1991, he was admitted to work full-time on ClubeMicro. After his father's retirement in 1999, Gavina do Couto was nominated the administrator of ClubeMicro and CEO of both companies. With the emergence of the Internet and alternative suppliers, ClubeMicro's commercial activity was officially extinct in 2009.

Since 2015, Gavina do Couto has been the owner of OR2 Web Productions.

== Author ==
Gavina do Couto has written blog posts and produced content broadcast via OR2 Streams.
