= Francisco de Aguirre =

Francisco de Aguirre may refer to:

- Francisco de Aguirre (conquistador) (1507–1581), Spanish conquistador of Chile
- Francisco de Aguirre (painter), Spanish Baroque painter from Toledo
