= José Vicente Beviá Pastor =

Spanish politician (1933–2017)

Vice President of the Congress of Deputies
- In office 29 June 1993 – 9 January 1996
- Preceded by: Juan Muñoz García
- Succeeded by: Enrique Fernández-Miranda

Member of the Congress of Deputies
- In office 6 April 1979 – 12 March 2000

Member of the Senate
- In office 15 June 1977 – 2 January 1979

Personal details
- Born: 6 October 1933 San Vicente del Raspeig
- Died: 28 July 2017 (aged 83) San Vicente del Raspeig
- Party: Socialist Workers' Party (since 1978)
- Other political affiliations: People's Socialist Party (until 1978)

José Vicente Beviá Pastor (6 October 1933 – 28 July 2017) was a Spanish politician. He was elected to the Senate in 1977, and served in the Congress of Deputies from 1979 to 2000. Between 1993 and 1996, Beviá Pastor was the Deputy Speaker of Congress of Deputies. He began his political career as a member of the People's Socialist Party and joined the Socialist Workers' Party in 1978.
