= José García Pérez (politician) =

Spanish writer and politician (1936–2022)

Member of the Congress of Deputies
- In office 15 June 1977 – 31 August 1982
- Constituency: Málaga

Personal details
- Born: 26 January 1936 Melilla, Spanish protectorate in Morocco
- Died: 19 June 2022 (aged 86) Málaga, Spain
- Party: UCD; PA
- Occupation: Writer

José García Pérez (26 January 1936 – 19 June 2022) was a Spanish politician.

A member of the Union of the Democratic Centre and the Andalusian Party, he served in the Congress of Deputies from 1977 to 1982.

García died of liver cancer in Málaga on 19 June 2022.
