= Carlos López Riaño =

Spanish politician (1940–2022)

Member of Congress of Deputies
- In office 1982–1996
- Constituency: Madrid

Personal details
- Born: 6 November 1940 Bóveda, Spain
- Died: 15 April 2022 (aged 81) Madrid, Spain
- Party: Spanish Socialist Workers' Party

Carlos López Riaño (6 November 1940 – 15 April 2022) was a Spanish politician who served as a Deputy.

== Political career ==
Carlos López Riaño joined the Spanish Socialist Workers' Party (PSOE) in 1966. He was active in the party’s internal critical faction, Izquierda Socialista, until leaving it in 1987 due to internal disagreements. He opposed Spain’s entry into NATO, for which he was formally reprimanded by the PSOE Federal Committee. He was elected as a member of the Congress of Deputies for the Madrid constituency for four consecutive terms, serving from 1982 to 1996. In 1994, he succeeded Baltasar Garzón as Delegate of the Government for the National Plan on Drugs, and during his tenure he proposed opening a public debate on the decriminalization of cannabis.
