= Jaume Castells Ferrer =

Spanish politician (born 1942)

Jaume Castells Ferrer (born 1942) is a Spanish politician for the Spanish Socialist Workers' Party (PSOE).

== Biography ==
Castells Ferrer was born at Benissa, in the province of Alicante.

From 1969 onwards, Castells worked in the steel industry becoming a member of the Unión General de Trabajadores (UGT), a major Spanish Trade union historically affiliated to the PSOE. He was a member of the Federal Committee of the UGT from 1975 to 1978. In 1974 he joined the PSOE and the following year became a member of the Valencian Provincial Executive of the party, subsequently moving to the National Executive of the party where he remained until 1993.

At the 1977 General Election he was elected to the Spanish Congress of Deputies representing Valencia Province and was re-elected in the five subsequent elections in 1979, 1982, 1986, 1989 and 1993. He was one of the main supporters of Joan Lerma for President of the Valencian Community.

He also served as a local councillor for his home town of Benissa from 1979 to 1987 serving as Mayor during this period.
