= Marcos Vizcaya Retana =

Spanish politician (1947–2025)

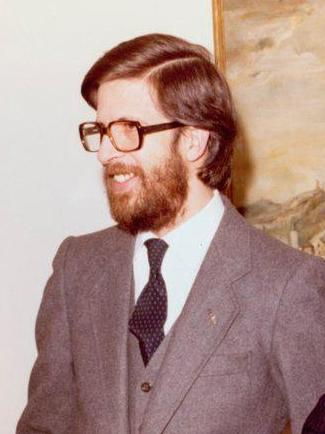
- Vizcaya in 1980

Member of the Congress of Deputies for Biscay
- In office 15 July 1977 – 15 July 1986

Personal details
- Born: 22 February 1947 Gorliz, Spain
- Died: 17 November 2025 (aged 78) Guecho, Spain
- Political party: EAJ-PNV
- Education: University of Deusto
- Occupation: Lawyer

Marcos Vizcaya Retana (22 February 1947 – 17 November 2025) was a Spanish politician. A member of the Basque Nationalist Party, he served in the Congress of Deputies from 1977 to 1986.

Vizcaya Retana was one of the drafters of the 1979 Statute of Autonomy of the Basque Country. He died on 17 November 2025, at the age of 78.
