= Manuel Ángel Aguilar Belda =

Spanish politician (born 1949)

Manuel Ángel Aguilar Belda (born 16 May 1949 in Bienservida, Albacete) is a Spanish politician. He is a member of the Spanish Socialist Workers' Party.

He obtained a degree in Psychology and Pedagogy, and was Advisor of Health and Social welfare of the Communities of Castilla-La Mancha in 1983. In 1982 he was elected to the Congress representing Albacete. In 1986 he moved to the Spanish Senate remaining a senator until 2000 when he returned to the Congress, however he only served three months before resigning.
