= Jenaro García-Arreciado =

Spanish politician (1947–2024)

Member of the Congress of Deputies for Huelva
- In office 18 November 1982 – 24 March 1998

Personal details
- Born: José Jenaro García-Arreciado Batanero; 24 April 1947 Huelva, Spain
- Died: 9 September 2024 (aged 77)
- Party: PSOE
- Education: University of Seville
- Occupation: Industrial engineer

José Jenaro García-Arreciado Batanero (24 April 1947 – 9 September 2024) was a Spanish industrial engineer of the Spanish Socialist Workers' Party (PSOE).

== Biography ==
Born in Huelva on 24 April 1947, García-Arreciado studied at the University of Seville's Higher Technical School of Engineering. From 1982 to 1998, he represented Huelva in the Congress of Deputies. He also served as Government Delegate in Ceuta from 2006 to 2008. He had joined the PSOE and the Unión General de Trabajadores in 1975 and served on the regional executive committee of the Spanish Socialist Workers' Party of Andalusia.

García-Arreciado died on 9 September 2024, at the age of 77.
