= Enrique Sapena Granell =

Spanish politician

Enrique Sapena Granell (1930, in Valencia, Spain – 7 June 2008) was a Spanish politician for the Spanish Socialist Workers' Party (PSOE).

Sapena was a railway worker who joined the PSOE in 1951 at a time when it was still illegal under the dictatorship of Franco. At the 1977 General Election he was elected to the Spanish Congress of Deputies representing Valencia Province and was re-elected in the two subsequent elections in 1979 and 1982.

In 1986 he moved to the upper chamber of the Spanish legislature when he was elected to the Spanish Senate. From 1987 to 1994 he represented Spain in the European parliament but retired from politics in the mid 1990s.

Numerous prominent Valencian politicians attended his funeral, where his body was draped in the flag of the Second Spanish Republic according to his wishes.
