= Antonio Rodríguez Rodríguez =

Spanish politician (1944–2026)

Member of the Senate of Spain for Ourense
- In office 3 March 1996 – 4 April 2000

Member of the Congress of Deputies for Ourense
- In office 15 March 1979 – 9 January 1996

Personal details
- Born: 27 May 1944 A Peroxa, Spain
- Died: 22 January 2026 (aged 81)
- Party: PSOE
- Occupation: Teacher

Antonio Rodríguez Rodríguez (27 May 1944 – 22 January 2026) was a Spanish politician. A member of the Spanish Socialist Workers' Party, he served in the Congress of Deputies from 1979 to 1996 and in the Senate from 1996 to 2000.

Rodríguez died on 22 January 2026, at the age of 81.
