= Josep Lluís Albiñana Olmos =

Spanish judge and politician

The Right Honourable Josep Lluís Albiñana Olmos
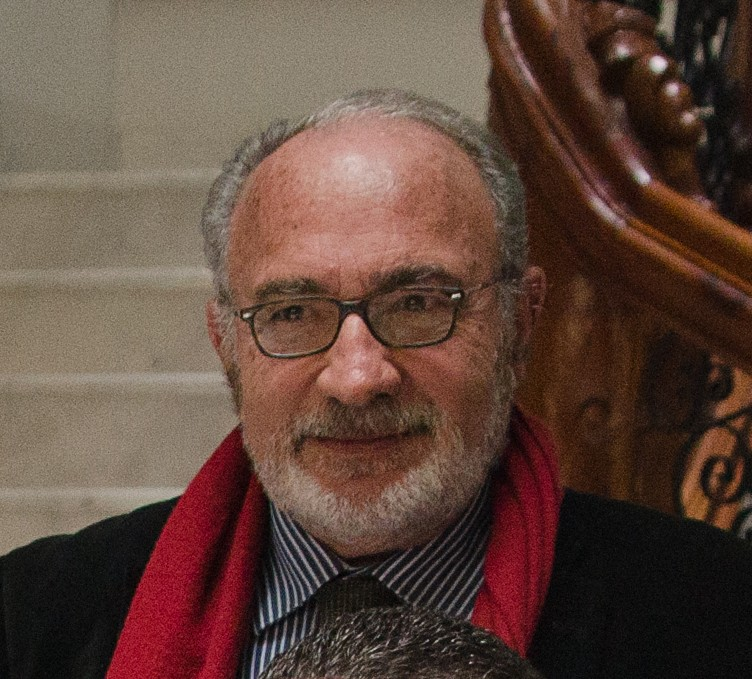
- Albiñana in 2014

President of the Valencian Government
- In office 1978–1979
- Monarch: Juan Carlos I of Spain
- Succeeded by: Enrique Monsonís

Personal details
- Born: 1943 (age 82–83) Valencia, Spain
- Party: PSPV-PSOE
- Occupation: Judge, Politician

Josep Lluís Albiñana Olmos (born 1943, in Valencia, Spain) is a Spanish judge and former politician in the Spanish Socialist Workers' Party (PSOE).

Married, with three children, Albiñana qualified as a lawyer. His first political involvement came in the late 1960s when he joined the Democratic Union of the Valencian Country (UDPV). However he later left the UDPV when the party decided to follow a Christian Democratic route. He then joined the PSOE in 1975 and was later elected to the party's federal executive committee.

In 1977 he stood in the first democratic elections since the death of the caudillo Francisco Franco as a candidate for the Spanish Congress of Deputies, heading the PSOE list in Valencia Province and was elected to Congress. In 1978, he became the first President of the Valencian Government, the Valencian regional administration. During his time in office, he pushed for full devolution of powers to the Valencian region and supported bilingualism, arguing that the Valencian language should be given equal status with Spanish in the Valencia region. He resigned the position in May 1979, feeling that he was failing to receive support from the local branch of the PSOE but was persuaded to resume his duties in June 1979. However, from July 1979 onwards, the PSOE members gradually withdrew from the Valencian administration in protest at what they perceived to be stalling on the devolution issue by the Union of the Democratic Centre which at that point formed the Spanish government. Albiñana finally resigned the Valencian Presidency on 22 December 1979.

He was re-elected to Congress in 1979 but resigned from Congress in February 1980. Albiñana retired from political life in 1983 and thereafter concentrated on his legal work, being reappointed a judge.
