= Eduardo Martín Toval =

Spanish lawyer and politician (1942–2019)

Personal details
- Born: March 5, 1942 Málaga, Spain
- Died: January 15, 2019 (aged 76) Málaga, Spain
- Profession: Lawyer, Professor, Politician

Eduardo Martín Toval (5 March 1942 – 15 January 2019) was a Spanish lawyer and politician who served as a Deputy between 1977 and 1980, and again between 1982 and 1995 and as a member of the Catalan Parliament between 1980 and 1982.

== Early life ==
Bachelor and Doctor of Law, during his youth he was linked to progressive Christian circles in Malaga. He joined the Labor Inspectorate and in 1967 he moved to Barcelona as Labor Inspector. Already in Barcelona, he was a professor of Labor Law at the Autonomous University of Barcelona. He also participated in the founding of the Center for Labor Studies and Advice, a university center for job counseling for workers.

He participated very actively in the preparation of the Spanish Constitution and, above all, the Statute of Autonomy of Catalonia, forming part of the "Commission of the Twenty". Between 1985 and 1993 was the spokesperson of the socialist group in the Congress of Deputies. In 1995 he resigned his seat to run for mayor of his hometown, Málaga, without getting past the third place (the triumph corresponded to the PP candidate, Celia Villalobos)

He died on 15 January 2019 after participating in a feminist demonstration in his hometown.
