= Emilio Attard Alonso =

Spanish politician

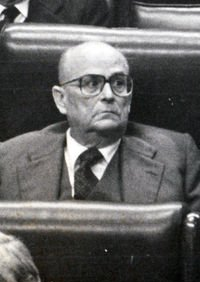
Emilio Attard in January 1981

Emilio Attard Alonso (Valencia, Spain, 8 April 1915 – Rocafort, 16 December 1997) was a Spanish politician.

Attard originally became politically active in his youth during the Second Spanish Republic. In this period he worked as a lawyer and a legal adviser to the Bank of Spain in Valencia. He also studied journalism in the early 1930s, writing numerous articles, and subsequently helped to found the Spanish Export Bank. By the 1960s he had become Deacon of the Spanish College of Lawyers.

Following the end of the dictatorship of Francisco Franco, became founder and President of the Valencian People's Party and Vice-President of the federation of People's Parties. That party, not to be confused with the current grouping of the same name, joined with other parties to form the Union of the Democratic Centre (UCD) in 1977. As a UCD member, at the 1977 General Election, he was elected to the Spanish Congress of Deputies representing Valencia Province and was re-elected in the subsequent election in 1979.

A distinguished lawyer, during the Spanish transition to democracy Attard was chosen as President of the parliamentary commission charged with editing the new Spanish constitution. Along with the other six members of the Constitutional Commission he was subsequently awarded the Grand Cross of Alonso X by the King Juan Carlos I. Within the UCD, he served as Vice-President of the UCD parliamentary group in Congress as well as serving on the UCD national executive and the Valencian regional executive. He was also one of the Vice-Presidents of the Congress.

The late 1970s in Valencia saw a dispute over the Valencian Statute of Autonomy, a period which became known as the "Battle of Valencia" (Spanish: Batalla de Valencia.) During this period Attard was a major figure in organising anti-Catalan groups as a political tactic for the UCD. However he was credited with coining the name of the Valencian Community (Spanish: Communidad Valenciana), a compromise between the UCD's preferred "Kingdom of Valencia" (Spanish: Reino de Valencia) and the Spanish Socialist Workers' Party's (PSOE) preferred "Valencian Country" (Spanish: País Valenciano.) He left the executive of the UCD in May 1981 and four years later resigned from the Council of State in protest at the naming of the former PSOE minister Tomás de la Cuadra Salcedo as President of that body.

In his later years he dedicated himself to his legal work. Besides this, he worked as Professor of Political rights at the University of Valencia. He also became President of the Constitutional Council of the Generalitat Valenciana, the Valencian Regional government in 1996 and authored numerous books, many of them on Spanish Constitutionalism and political history.

== Published works ==
- Vida y muerte de UCD (1983)
- Conviviendo en libertad (1986)
- La constitución española por dentro
- Constitucionalismo español: 1808-1978 (1988)
- Mi razón política (1994)
- Diccionario ideológico político de la transición (1995)
- Bosquejo histórico-político de la España contemporánea (1996).
