= Francisco Soler Valero =

Spanish politician and lawyer

Francisco Soler Valero was a lawyer and Spanish politician.

Married with two children, Soler held a doctorate in law and was a practicing lawyer. He served under the Franco government as one of the Deputy directors in the Education ministry. In 1975 he became Economic and Administrative Director of the Francoist Movement's Press.

After the restoration of democracy in the mid 1970s he joined the newly formed Union of the Democratic Centre (UCD) and in 1977 he was elected to the Spanish Congress of Deputies representing Almería Province. He was re-elected in 1979 as the second placed candidate on the UCD list. As a leading figure in the Almeria provincial branch of the UCD, he explored the possibility of Almeria forming an autonomous community with the Region of Murcia however nothing came of this proposal.

As a result of internal party divisions he resigned from the UCD in 1982 and, along with three other former UCD deputies, joined the Popular Alliance, being re-elected as an AP deputy at the 1982 election. He did not stand at the 1986 election.
