= Francisco Gaviña Ribelles =

Spanish chemist and politician

Francisco Gaviña Ribelles (Valencia, Spain, 1941–1990) was a Spanish chemist and politician for the Spanish Socialist Workers' Party (PSOE).

Gaviña first stood as a candidate for Valencia Province in the 1977 General Election, however he was placed thirteenth on the PSOE list and failed to win a seat.

Two years later he was elected to Zaragoza city council and in the 1982 election he was elected for Valencia Province, serving until 1986. Thereafter, in October 1987, he became Professor of Organic Chemistry at the University of Valencia In 2004 he was posthumously awarded the gold medal of Zaragoza city council.
