= José Luis Adsuar Ferrando =

Spanish politician

José Luis Adsuar Ferrando (born 1946) is a Spanish politician for the Spanish Socialist Workers' Party (PSOE).

Born in Riola, Valencia Province, Adsuar worked as a Primary School teacher before standing as a PSOE candidate at the 1982 General Election where he was elected to the Spanish Congress of Deputies representing Valencia Province. He did not stand at the 1986 election. In Parliament he was a member of the Commission of Agriculture livestock and fishing.
