= Ricardo de la Cierva =

Spanish historian and politician (1926–2015)

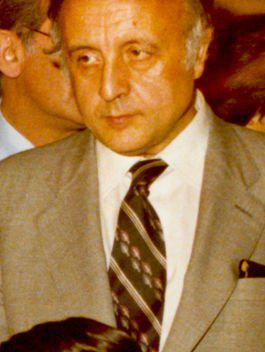

Minister of Culture
- In office 17 January 1980 – 9 September 1980
- Preceded by: Manuel Clavero
- Succeeded by: Íñigo Cavero

Member of the Senate
- In office 5 June 1977 – 2 January 1979
- Constituency: Murcia

Member of the Congress of Deputies
- In office 15 March 1979 – 31 August 1982
- Constituency: Murcia

Personal details
- Born: Ricardo de la Cierva y Hoces; 9 November 1926 Madrid
- Died: 19 November 2015 (aged 89) Madrid
- Party: People's Alliance (since 1982)
- Other political affiliations: Union of the Democratic Centre (until 1982)

Ricardo de la Cierva y Hoces (9 November 1926 – 19 November 2015) was a Spanish historian and politician.

A native of Madrid, de la Cierva served the constituency of Murcia in the Congress of Deputies and Senate from 1977 to 1982. He was the Minister of Culture for nine months in 1980. Originally a member of the Union of the Democratic Centre, de la Cierva switched to the People's Alliance in February 1982, later stepped down from the Cortes Generales upon the end of his term in August of that year. De la Cierva won the second prize of the 1988 Premio Planeta de Novela, and also wrote for the magazine Época. He died in 2015.

== Works ==
His work General Bibliography on the Spanish War (1936-1939) and its Historical Antecedents (1968) was considered by Herbert Southworth an "intellectual scandal".
