= Luis Berenguer =

Spanish writer

Luis Berenguer y Moreno de Guerra (Ferrol, La Coruña, 11 December 1923 – San Fernando, Cádiz, 14 September 1979) was a Spanish writer. He wrote six novels, the first of which, El mundo de Juan Lobón (1967), is his best known work. It won the Premio de la Crítica and was turned into a television series. He also won the Premio Alfaguara in 1971 for Lena Verde.

== Family background ==
Luis Berenguer Moreno de Guerra was born in El Ferrol (La Coruña) on December 11, 1923. He did not have Galician roots. He was born there, as he himself used to say, by "Ministerial order" as his father had been posted to El Ferrol as a naval doctor. Luis was the third son of Rafael Berenguer de las Cagigas and María Luisa Moreno de Guerra.

His Berenguer forebears came from both old Navy and landowning families. His paternal grandfather, Juan Berenguer Salazar, born in Callosa de Ensarriat (Alicante), was also a naval doctor. Specializing in tropical diseases, he spent thirteen years in the Philippines before being sent to help with a cholera epidemic in Valencia, where his son was born. Another paternal relation was General Dámaso Berenguer y Fusté (1873–1953), Presidente del Gobierno (i.e. Prime minister) during the short period called "Dictablanda", which in 1930 followed the dictatorship of Primo de Rivera. Although only second cousins, they had been very close since childhood and one of Luis's brothers, Juan, married the general's granddaughter.

On Luis's mother's side his grandfather Rafael Moreno de Guerra y Croquer, a native of San Fernando (Cádiz) and another naval officer, pursued a typical colonial career: after four years in Cuba and two in Fernando Po he spent twelve years in the Philippines, where his last posting was civil-military governor in Pollok (Mindanao). Rafael's second wife, Emilia Fernández Ruiz de Morales, daughter of an Army officer from Extremadura, had lived in Manila since her childhood. Their daughter, Luis's mother, María Luisa Moreno de Guerra, was born aboard ship in the bay of Zamboanga at the moment that the Spanish flag was lowered in the islands: thus in the family it was always said that she was the last Spaniard of Filipinos.

Many more distant ancestors on Luis Berenguer's mother's side (the Moreno de Guerra, Macé, Croquer y Tiscar) played distinguished roles in the history of San Fernando. His great-grandfather, Juan Nepomuceno Moreno de Guerra y Macé, was the Mayor of the city in 1846–1847, Member of Parliament, hereditary Knight of Ronda and rich landowner, who donated land for a public park in San Fernando (which still exists under his name) in 1853. The Croquer, another old naval family from San Fernando, came originally from Cornwall.

In 1927 the Berenguer-Moreno de Guerra family moved to Madrid, taking Luis's maternal grandmother with them. Luis used to recall from his childhood that "Grandma told us stories of those islands that excited our imagination, using some words in Tagalo (the native language of the Philippines), stories of lizards and snakes and a wet-nurse who wanted to exchange her son for my cousin Paco, because he was more beautiful". His grandmother told further stories, more or less apocryphal, of how she was defending the bay when the enemies took her prisoner and burned her finger to force her to reveal where the cannons were. Such eccentricities all added to Luis Berenguer's upbringing within a conservative and religious Spanish family.

== Early life ==
Part of the reason why Luis ended up in San Fernando was that his mother's family had deep roots in the South of Spain, as we have seen. At the beginning of the Civil War, however, his father Rafael Berenguer de las Cagigas was on leave in Madrid, having just disembarked from his ship Cervantes. He was taken prisoner by the Republican government, as one of the many officers suspected of cooperation with the Nationalist rebels and was taken to San Antón jail in Cartagena. His wife and his three children, plus two nephews who had just lost their parents in the bombing of Madrid, were taken in due course to La Aljorra outside Cartagena, where Rafael, her husband and still a prisoner, had been put to work as a doctor.

For Luis, his brother and his cousins, all "children of the war", the civil war was a time of freedom. He loved Nature and every kind of animal. He was taken to farms. He played Tarzan and the Apes with his cousins in the countryside around Cartagena. "We never had a better time in our lives", as his brother wrote later. They rode a bicycle (only one between five children). They had a donkey which they loved so much that they brushed its teeth. They fed the horses and chickens. They milked the goats and sheep and picked everything they could find: tomatoes, wild artichokes, oranges, figs and almonds.

At the end of the war Luis's father's status was extremely delicate. Like many others he might have faced death for giving help to the now defeated Republicans in spite of the fact that he only did so under duress. As it was, he was brought before a military court (Tribunal de Depuración) and cleared, a verdict no doubt helped by family connections. In 1940 the family moved to San Fernando, where Rafael was appointed Director of San Carlos, the naval hospital. In 1944 Luis, followed by his brothers and his two cousins all joined the Navy. “That was something so obvious for us that we never thought you could become anything else".

He married Elvira Monzón Ristori (b. Grazalema, 1927) in April 1954 in San Fernando and moved to Madrid, where their first two daughters were born. He found the job of a junior officer at the Admiralty (Cuerpo General) boring and decided to widen his studies in order to become an engineer. For that, he had to remain in Madrid.

He frequented literary circles, above all at the Gijón café. His extrovert and generous personality made him particularly welcome and he made many friends. He met Dámaso Alonso, Gerardo Diego, José García Nieto, Ramón de Garciasol, Ángel Oliver, José Gerardo Manrique de Lara and Juan Garcés (writer and naval judge), among others. With Oliver he used to pay visits to Pío Baroja. Berenguer confessed that the first Spanish literary figures that he admired were Miguel de Unamuno and then José Ortega y Gasset. These were in turn displaced by Pio Baroja and then by his friends and contemporaries Camilo José Cela and Miguel Delibes.

To conclude his studies in engineering (naval weapons), he was sent to Washington. The year in the United States (1956–1957) was very pleasant for him: the comfortable "American way of life" bore no comparison with the poor standard of living in Spain; neither did the ease of social relationships.

Back from America he applied for a posting in Cádiz. Several issues combined to make him take this decision, which meant moving away from Spain's literary circles. His father had cancer and lived in San Fernando, as did his parents-in-law; it was cheaper than Madrid and they were expecting their fourth child (of eleven eventually). Luis came to say, maybe just to console himself, that, if he had remained in Madrid at the in-crowd at the Gijón café, he would not have written a single line.

Still a naval officer, he died suddenly of a heart attack in 1979. By then he had completed six novels, through which he had ridden rapidly to the Spanish literary Olympus, thanks particularly to the first, The World of Juan Lobón (El mundo de Juan Lobón), which was later made into a television series.

== The writer ==
In an unpublished text and in several interviews Berenguer affirmed that he did not find his own identity in his childhood and youth; rather - following, perhaps, Baroja's "sentimental base" of every writer's feelings - that "his vital time", i.e. his own world rather than his parents´ world, was the decade of the 1950s: all the time before that was in a way outside him, to be recalled later through adult eyes. Since his early 20s, though, he had been conscious of his literary vocation, writing in secret in between his naval duties without publishing anything until 1967.

Berenguer was fond of sport shooting. This took him deep into the Andalusian countryside and mountains, where he formed friendships with some of the peasants who eked out their solitary lives in those wild surroundings. From these encounters came the inspiration for a series of biographical sketches, of which the most important was that of José Ruiz Morales (Alcalá de los Gazules, 1927 - Marbella, 1996), better known by everybody as “Perea”. This provided the initial idea for his first book, as a result of an incident that he recounted as follows:

"The series of biographical sketches of wild Gaditanos came to me like a shot from my gun. At the start these were festive vignettes written for fun rather than from any idea of serious literature and only developed in that direction when I introduced the character who was to become Juan Lobón. The note of pathos demanded by the strength and integrity of Lobón's character inevitably broke the comic mood, culminating in a trivial incident which gave me the story's true theme. Three days before Christmas Juan Lobón arrived at my front door to ask me to do him the favour of going with him to the Guardia Civil headquarters to get his shooting licence back. There, in reply, the Police produced a criminal record, as long as a roll of lavatory paper. In its summary it said: A dangerous person, living in sin and dwelling outside the law. The brutal shock that Juan Lobón suffered on listening to such a description became the theme of my novel, i.e. that of a man who is persecuted for his virtues and for the skill with which he conducts his life; a man with a noble personality and a self-sufficient way of being at the edge of a society, from which he only calls for a doctor to help others rather himself".

Such was the origin of The World of Juan Lobón (El mundo de Juan Lobón, 1967), a novel that was short-listed for the Alfaguara Prize funded by the publishing firm of the Cela brothers. But the success of the book did not end there. The Cela brothers put it forward for the Nacional de la Crítica prize, the most prestigious award in the Spanish language at that time. Luis Berenguer won, an unknown junior Naval officer, aged 43, who thus became a national figure in 1968–69.

The World of Juan Lobón follows the traditional picaresque path encouraged by Camilo José Cela. In the book, a peasant living in the wilds is taken to prison for an offence that he has not committed. In prison he learns that the woman he loves is going to have a baby and he cannot bear the idea that his child should grow up ashamed of his father because he had been condemned as a vago y maleante, a vagabond and evil-doer. Inspired by Lobón, Berenguer was sailing close to the wind in his implied criticism of the Spain of the 1960s when the censor still ruled.

Juan Lobón embodied many of Berenguer's ideals: a primitive man, strong, free, honest, funny and generous; who, acting as if still in the hunter-gatherer era of human development, confronts the landowners and the civil authorities, convinced that nobody has the right to enclose the land and that wild animals and birds exist to provide food for the hunter. Lobón is the incarnation of Jean-Jacques Rousseau's good savage; and, as another critic said, a border-line individual, between a gaucho and a cowboy, inside one of the great landed estates of Andalusia. Writing in the first person and with echoes of Genesis, Leviticus and also Kipling's Jungle Book, Berenguer's ideal Juan Lobón opens the book with statements of his creed, explaining the conflict between the age-old unwritten law and the new law made by the rich against the poor:

"They made the law for other people, for inadequate people, for ignorant people, who have never had to struggle for life in the wild […]. I know that nobody gets off his donkey just to allow the donkey rest; he does so only because he has become tired of riding on the donkey or because he has reached his destination […]"

Berenguer reflects the rural poverty of the South which he had seen with his own eyes since the 1940s. The natural environment of Lobón is that of traditional Andalusia, a countryside in deep crisis where a primitive economy still existed, based on hunting and gathering (asparagus, snails, palm hearts, mushrooms, heather roots). However, this world, romantically seen as a Garden of Eden, is changing: in a few short years it is leaving behind the feudal attitudes of the great estates and the poverty which was rife in the post-war years, to embrace the developments of the 1960s and the arrival of the Sunday hunters of the urban middle class, both of which threatened the traditional life of the wild.

After the success of his first book Berenguer, with the discipline of a professional writer, published five more novels with different, though often related, themes: The hard life of the fishermen along the Cádiz coast (Marea escorada, "High Tide" 1969); the insuperable tensions between landowners and peasants in the Andalusian countryside (Lena Verde, "Green Firewood", 1972); the historic neglect leading to the eventual defeat of naval officers sent out to the colonies in the 19th century (Sotavento. Crónica de los olvidados, "Leeward, chronicle of the Forgotten Ones", 1973); the decline of the old seigneurial class and the arrival of new money in the countryside (La noche de Catalina virgen "The Night of Catalina the Virgin", 1975); and, finally, the feeling of alienation felt by those trapped by their education and their past and thus left behind by the modern world (Tamatea, novia del otoño, "Tamatea, Autumn's Girlfriend", published posthumously in 1980).

All Berenguer's books are still in print, the last complete edition being in 2009. As we have seen, one of them was adapted for a television series (El mundo de Juan Lobón). The author would also have been very pleased to see just how many words, previously only current in Andalusia, have now been incorporated into the Diccionario del Español Actual (1999, 2011), thanks to him and to the power of the characters that he created.

== Bibliography ==
- Berenguer, Luis. El mundo de Juan Lobón, ed. Ana Sofía Pérez-Bustamante Mourier. Madrid: Cátedra, 2010.
- _____. Biblioteca Berenguer, 6 vols., Sevilla, Algaida, 2009.
- Domingo, José. La novela española del siglo XX, 2: De la postguerra a nuestros días. Barcelona: Labor, 1973, págs. 142–143.
- Fortes, José Antonio. La nueva narrativa andaluza. Una lectura de sus textos. Barcelona: Anthropos, 1990.
- Grosso, Alfonso. “Prólogo” a Juan Lobón y otras historias. Barcelona: Dopesa, 1976, págs. XIII-XVI.
- Martínez Cachero, José María. La novela española entre 1936 y 1980. Historia de una aventura. Madrid: Castalia, 1985.
- Morán, Fernando. Novela y semidesarrollo (Una interpretación de la novela hispanoamericana y española). Madrid: Taurus, 1971.
- Núñez, Antonio. “Encuentro con Luis Berenguer” (entrevista), Ínsula (Madrid), nº 305, 1972, pág. 4.
- Ortiz de Lanzagorta, José Luis. Narrativa andaluza: doce diálogos de urgencia. Sevilla: Universidad, 1972.
- Pérez-Bustamante Mourier, Ana Sofía. Los pasos perdidos de Luis Berenguer (1923-1979). Biografía y textos inéditos. Sevilla: Alfar, 1999.
- _____. “El epistolario de Luis Berenguer: el escritor, los diccionarios y la Real Academia Española de la Lengua”, Salina(Tarragona), nº 24, 2012, págs. 55–70.
- Ramos Ortega, Manuel J.; Pérez-Bustamante Mourier, Ana Sofía (eds.). La narrativa de Luis Berenguer (1923-1979). Cádiz: Universidad, 1998
- Ruiz-Copete, Juan de Dios. Introducción y proceso a la nueva narrativa andaluza. Sevilla: Diputación, 1976.
- Soldevila Durante, Ignacio. La novela española desde 1936. Historia de la literatura española actual, 2. Madrid: Alhambra, 1980, págs. 186–189.
- Tovar, Antonio. Novela española e hispanoamericana. Madrid: Alfaguara, 1972, págs. 281–288.
- Wood, Guy H. “La tradición del hombre salvaje en El mundo de Juan Lobón”, Revista de Estudios Hispánicos, vol. 28, nº 3, 1994, págs. 419–441.
