= Leopoldo Torres (politician) =

Spanish jurist and politician (1941–2021)

Leopoldo Torres Boursault (12 January 1941 – 22 June 2021) was a Spanish jurist, lawyer and politician, who served as a Member of the Congress of Deputies and Prosecutor General of the State.
