= Union of the Democratic Centre (Spain) =

Union of the Democratic Centre Unión de Centro Democrático
- Abbreviation: UCD
- Leader: Adolfo Suárez (1977–1981); Leopoldo Calvo-Sotelo (1981–1982)
- Founded: 3 May 1977 (alliance); 7 August 1977 (party)
- Dissolved: 18 February 1983
- Ideology: Constitutional monarchism Christian democracy Liberalism; Reformism; Factions: Liberal conservatism Social democracy
- Political position: Centre to centre-right
- European affiliation: European Democrat Union (observer)
- Colours: Orange, Green

The Union of the Democratic Centre (Spanish: Unión de Centro Democrático, UCD, also translated as "Democratic Centre Union") was an electoral alliance, and later political party, in Spain, existing from 1977 to 1983. It was initially led by Adolfo Suárez (1977–1981) and then by Leopoldo Calvo-Sotelo (1981–1982). It was dissolved in 1983 following ideological splits and member defections to other parties, such as the Spanish Socialist Workers' Party or the People's Alliance.

== History ==
=== Formation ===
The coalition, in fact a federation of parties, was formed on 3 May 1977, during the transition to democracy from the dictatorship of Francisco Franco, with the involvement of leaders from a variety of newly formed centrist and rightist factions, under the leadership of Suárez, then Prime Minister. The principal components of the UCD defined themselves as Christian democrats, liberals, social democrats, or "independents", the latter frequently comprising conservative elements which had been part of the Franco regime.

The parties that made the UCD coalition were:

- Christian democrats:
  - Christian Democratic Party (PDC) of Fernando Álvarez de Miranda and Íñigo Cavero.
- Social democrats:
  - Social Democratic Federation (FSD) of José Ramón Lasuén Sancho. It comprised ten regional parties.
  - Social Democratic Party (PSD) of Francisco Fernández Ordóñez and Rafael Arias-Salgado. It comprised six regional parties.
  - Independent Social Democratic Party (PSI) of Gonzalo Casado.
- Governmentalists:
  - People's Party (PP) of Pío Cabanillas, Emilio Attard Alonso and José Pedro Pérez Llorca. It comprised seven regional parties.
- Liberals:
  - Federation of Democratic and Liberal Parties (FPDL) of Joaquín Garrigues Walker and Antonio Fontán. It comprised nine regional parties.
  - People's Democratic Party (PDP) of Ignacio Camuñas Solís.
  - Liberal Party (PL) of Enrique Larroque.
  - Liberal Progressive Party (PPL) of Juan García Madariaga.
- Regional parties:
  - Extremaduran Regional Action (AREX) of Enrique Sánchez de León.
  - Independent Galician Party (PGI) of José Luis Meilán.
  - Andalusian Social Liberal Party (PSLA) of Manuel Clavero.
  - Canarian Union (UC) of Lorenzo Olarte.
  - Murcian Democratic Union (UDM) of Antonio Pérez Crespo.
- Later the Independent Social Federation (FSI) of Jesús Sancho Rof was also added to the coalition.

Some months later, all these parties were merged and UCD constituted itself as a party on 4 August 1977.

=== In government ===
In the elections of 15 June 1977, the party took 34.4% of the vote and 166 seats of the 350 in the Congress of Deputies. The party governed as a minority and worked with all major parties in the Congress, including the rightist People's Alliance and the parties of the left, the Spanish Socialist Workers' Party (PSOE) and Communists (PCE). Suárez became the first democratically chosen prime minister of Spain after the Franco period. The UCD played a major role in writing the new constitution, as three of the seven members of the constitutional drafting commission, established after those elections, came from the party.

In 1979, the Socialist Workers' Party moderated its outlook by dropping the references to Marxism from its programme. At the same time, the right-wing People's Alliance increasingly moved to the political centre (and, by undergoing a generational change, could overcome its Francoist image), thus the space for the centrist UCD shrank. Despite this, the UCD was returned for a second term in the 1979 general election, with a slight increase in vote share but could not attain a majority, with 34.8% of the vote and 168 deputies.

=== Internal divisions and defections ===
The demise of the UCD began when an internal conflict emerged between its diverse factions. Many believe that the only factor that had kept the party together was the writing of the constitution. With that work done, the party became increasingly unpopular due to the growth of unemployment, inflation and the general economic crisis affecting the country.

During the course of the 1979–1982 legislature, the party suffered a number of serious splits and defections. On 7 March 1980, Joaquim Molins resigned from the UCD group and later joined the Catalan Nationalist Convergence and Union. On 25 April 1980, Manuel Clavero resigned from the party in disputes over the statute of autonomy for Andalusia. Two months later, José García Pérez resigned over the same issue; García would join the Andalusian Socialist Party on 1 September 1981. Meanwhile, Suárez resigned as prime minister in January 1981. He was replaced by Leopoldo Calvo Sotelo for the remainder of the term of the Cortes.

On 10 November 1981, Manuel Díaz-Piniés resigned from the party and on 1 February 1982 he, together with three other deputies Miguel Herrero de Miñón, Ricardo de la Cierva and Francisco Soler Valero joined the Popular Alliance (AP). The first of a number of breakaway parties emerged three days later on 4 February 1982 when 10 UCD deputies from the left of the party - Francisco Fernández Ordóñez, Antonio Alfonso Quirós, Luis Berenguer, Carmela García Moreno, Ciriaco Díaz Porras, Luis González Seara, Eduardo Moreno, Javier Moscoso, María Dolores Pelayo and Carmen Solano formed the Democratic Action Party (Partido de Acción Democrática/PAD). This group stood as part of the PSOE list in the 1982 election and merged with the PSOE in January 1983.

In the summer of 1982, the party splintered further. Two deputies (Modesto Fraile and Carlos Gila) quit the party, in August, they, along with 11 other UCD deputies (Óscar Alzaga, Mariano Alierta, Joaquín Galant, Julen Guimon, María Josefa Lafuente, José Luis Moreno, Francisco Olivencia, José Manuel Otero, José Pin Arboledas, José Luis Ruiz Navarro and Luis Vega), formed the People's Democratic Party (PDP). This party allied itself with the AP for the 1982 election.

Also in August, 16 deputies, headed by the former leader and Prime Minister Adolfo Suarez formed the Democratic and Social Centre (CDS). Among the founding members were deputies such as Agustín Rodríguez Sahagún, Jaume Barnola, León Buil, Rafael Calvo Ortega, José María Mesa, Josep Pujadas, José Javier Rodríguez Alcaide and Manuel de Sàrraga and Alejandro Rebollo Álvarez-Amandi. The CDS fought the 1982 election in direct competition with the UCD.

Although the UCD had been joined by José María de Areilza and Antoni de Senillosa, who had defected from the AP, the UCD party group had now been reduced to 124 deputies - 52 short of a majority. The PSOE at this point had 118 deputies and could also count on the support of the 10 deputies of the PAD and the 21 members of the Communist Party. In light of this new situation in Parliament, Calvo Sotelo called fresh elections.

=== 1982 election and disbanding ===
Following the 1981 coup attempt, the socialists convincingly won the 1982 general election. The UCD, presenting Landelino Lavilla Alsina as its candidate for prime minister, was nearly wiped out, taking only 6.7% of the vote and 11 seats, losing over 100 of their sitting deputies—one of the worst defeats ever suffered by a western European governing party. The CDS also fared poorly, with only two of its sixteen sitting deputies winning seats.

Most of the UCD's electorate became supporters of the AP-PDP alliance, which later became the People's Party, today Spain's principal conservative party. The AP-PDP displaced the UCD as the main alternative to the PSOE.

Many ex-ministers and leaders of the UCD also joined the AP ranks. Subsequently, the UCD was disbanded on 18 February 1983.

== Electoral performance ==
=== Cortes Generales ===
Cortes Generales
Election	Leading candidate	Congress			Senate			Gov.
Election	Leading candidate	Votes	%	Seats	Votes	%	Seats	Gov.
1977	Adolfo Suárez	6,310,391	34.4 (#**1**)	165 / 350	15,472,170	29.9 (#**1**)	106 / 207	Yes
1979	Adolfo Suárez	6,268,593	34.8 (#**1**)	168 / 350	16,691,333	33.2 (#**1**)	119 / 208	Yes
1982	Landelino Lavilla	1,425,093	6.8 (#3)	11 / 350	4,017,007	6.8 (#3)	4 / 208	No

=== Regional parliaments ===
Region	Election	Votes	%	#	Seats	Status in legislature
Andalusia	1982	371,154	13.03%	3rd	15 / 109	Opposition
Basque Country	1980	78,095	8.49%	5th	6 / 60	Opposition
Catalonia	1980	Within CC–UCD			18 / 135	Confidence and supply
Galicia	1981	274,191	27.80%	2nd	24 / 71	Confidence and supply
Navarre	1979	68,040	26.69%	**1st**	20 / 70	Mandatory coalition

=== Results timeline ===
Year	(Spain) ES	(European Union) EU	(Andalusia) AN	(Aragon) AR	(Asturias) AS	(Canary Islands) CN	(Cantabria) CB	(Castilla–La Mancha) CM	(Castile and León) CL	(Catalonia) CT	(Ceuta) CE	(Extremadura) EX	(Galicia (Spain)) GL	(Balearic Islands) IB	RI	(Community of Madrid) MD	(Melilla) ML	(Region of Murcia) MC	(Navarre) NC	(Basque Country (autonomous community)) PV	(Valencian Community) CV
1977	34.4	N/A	N/A	N/A	N/A	N/A	N/A	N/A	N/A	N/A	N/A	N/A	N/A	N/A	N/A	N/A	N/A	N/A	N/A	N/A	N/A
1978		N/A	N/A	N/A	N/A	N/A	N/A	N/A	N/A	N/A	N/A	N/A	N/A	N/A	N/A	N/A	N/A	N/A	N/A	N/A	N/A
1979	34.4	N/A	N/A	N/A	N/A	N/A	N/A	N/A	N/A	N/A	N/A	N/A	N/A	N/A	N/A	N/A	N/A	N/A	26.7	N/A	N/A
1980		N/A	N/A	N/A	N/A	N/A	N/A	N/A	N/A	10.6	N/A	N/A	N/A	N/A	N/A	N/A	N/A	N/A		8.5	N/A
1981		N/A	N/A	N/A	N/A	N/A	N/A	N/A	N/A	10.6	N/A	N/A	27.8	N/A	N/A	N/A	N/A	N/A		8.5	N/A
1982	6.8	N/A	13.0	N/A	N/A	N/A	N/A	N/A	N/A	10.6	N/A	N/A	27.8	N/A	N/A	N/A	N/A	N/A		8.5	N/A
Year	(Spain) ES	(European Union) EU	(Andalusia) AN	(Aragon) AR	(Asturias) AS	(Canary Islands) CN	(Cantabria) CB	(Castilla–La Mancha) CM	(Castile and León) CL	(Catalonia) CT	(Ceuta) CE	(Extremadura) EX	(Galicia (Spain)) GL	(Balearic Islands) IB	RI	(Community of Madrid) MD	(Melilla) ML	(Region of Murcia) MC	(Navarre) NC	(Basque Country (autonomous community)) PV	(Valencian Community) CV
**Bold** indicates best result to date. Present in legislature (in opposition); Junior coalition partner Senior coalition partner

== Literature ==
- Hopkin, Jonathan (1999), Party Formation and Democratic Transition in Spain: The Creation and Collapse of the Union of the Democratic Centre, Macmillan Press, ISBN 0312219121

== See also ==
- Politics of Spain
- Spanish transition to democracy
- José Larrañaga Arenas
