= 1983 Madrid municipal election =

Election in the Spanish municipality of Madrid

- 8 May 1983

All 57 seats in the City Council of Madrid 29 seats needed for a majority
- Opinion polls
- Registered: 2,380,846 ▲0.1%
- Turnout: 1,685,115 (70.8%) ▲4.8 pp
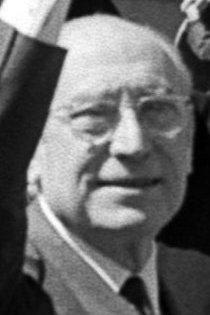

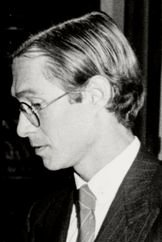

	First party	Second party	Third party
Leader	Enrique Tierno Galván	Jorge Verstrynge	Adolfo Pastor
Party	PSOE	AP–PDP–UL	PCE
Leader since	1979	1983	1983
Last election	25 seats, 39.5%	Did not contest	9 seats, 14.7%
Seats won	30	23	4
Seat change	▲5	▲23	▼5
Popular vote	808,350	631,183	113,112
Percentage	48.4%	37.8%	6.8%
Swing	▲8.9 pp	New party	▼7.9 pp
Mayor before election
Enrique Tierno Galván
PSOE
Mayor after election
Enrique Tierno Galván
PSOE

A municipal election was held in Madrid on 8 May 1983 to elect the 2nd City Council of the municipality. All 57 seats in the City Council were up for election. It was held concurrently with regional elections in thirteen autonomous communities and local elections all across Spain.

The Spanish Socialist Workers' Party (PSOE) won with an absolute majority of 30 councillors and 48.7% of the vote, the only time to date it would do so. The People's Coalition, the electoral alliance led by the People's Alliance (AP) and including the People's Democratic Party (PDP) and the Liberal Union (UL), consolidated its gains made in the 1982 Spanish general election and emerged as the second political force in the city, with 38.0% and 23 seats in the City Council. Meanwhile, the Communist Party of Spain (PCE) vote fell as a result of PSOE's growth, losing over half of its councillors down to 4. The Union of the Democratic Centre (UCD) had collapsed in the October general election and was disbanded in early 1983. Several UCD split parties such as Liberal Democratic Party (PDL) or former Prime Minister Adolfo Suárez' Democratic and Social Centre (CDS) contested the election but failed to win any representation.

As a result of the election, Enrique Tierno Galván, was re-elected as Mayor of Madrid for a second term in office. Tierno Galván would die halfway throughout his term of natural causes, being substituted by party colleague Juan Barranco.

== Overview ==
Under the 1978 Constitution, the governance of municipalities in Spain—part of the country's local government system—was centered on the figure of city councils (Spanish: ayuntamientos), local corporations with independent legal personality composed of a mayor, a government council and an elected legislative assembly. The mayor was indirectly elected by the local assembly, requiring an absolute majority; otherwise, the candidate from the most-voted party automatically became mayor (ties were resolved by drawing lots). In the case of Madrid, the top-tier administrative and governing body was the City Council of Madrid.

=== Date ===
The term of local assemblies in Spain expired four years after the date of their previous election. The election decree was required to be issued no later than the day after the expiration date of the assemblies, with election day taking place within from 55 to 70 days after the decree's publication in the Official State Gazette (BOE).

Elections to the assemblies of local entities were officially called on 10 March 1983 with the publication of the corresponding decree in the BOE, setting election day for 8 May.

=== Electoral system ===
Voting for local assemblies was based on universal suffrage, comprising all Spanish nationals over 18 years of age, registered and residing in the municipality and with full civil and political rights.

Local councillors were elected using the D'Hondt method and closed-list proportional voting, with a five percent-threshold of valid votes (including blank ballots) in each municipality. Each municipality was a multi-member constituency, with a number of seats based on the following scale:

Population	Councillors
<250	5
251–1,000	7
1,001–2,000	9
2,001–5,000	11
5,001–10,000	13
10,001–20,000	17
20,001–50,000	21
50,001–100,000	25
>100,001	+1 per each 100,000 inhabitants or fraction +1 if total is an even number

The law did not provide for by-elections to fill vacant seats; instead, any vacancies arising after the proclamation of candidates and during the legislative term were filled by the next candidates on the party lists or, when required, by designated substitutes.

== Opinion polls ==
The tables below list opinion polling results in reverse chronological order, showing the most recent first and using the dates when the survey fieldwork was done, as opposed to the date of publication. Where the fieldwork dates are unknown, the date of publication is given instead. The highest percentage figure in each polling survey is displayed with its background shaded in the leading party's colour. If a tie ensues, this is applied to the figures with the highest percentages. The "Lead" column on the right shows the percentage-point difference between the parties with the highest percentages in a poll.

=== Voting intention estimates ===
The table below lists weighted voting intention estimates. Refusals are generally excluded from the party vote percentages, while question wording and the treatment of "don't know" responses and those not intending to vote may vary between polling organisations. When available, seat projections determined by the polling organisations are also displayed below (or in place of) the voting estimates in a smaller font; 29 seats were required for an absolute majority in the City Council of Madrid.

Polling firm/Commissioner	Fieldwork date	Sample size	Turnout	UCD	PSOE	PCE	AP–PDP–UL	CDS	PDL	Lead
1983 municipal election	8 May 1983	—N/a	70.8	–	48.4; 30	6.8; 4	37.8; 23	3.0; 0	2.6; 0	10.6
Sofemasa/El País	23–26 Apr 1983	?	78.0	–	56.7; 37/39	8.5; 4/5	20.9; 15/17	3.9; 0	1.1; 0	35.8
AP (Note: Undecided and/or abstentionists excluded.)	14 Mar 1983	3,082	71	–	44.8; 27	6.1; 3	43.8; 27	<5.0; 0	–	1.0
1982 general election	28 Oct 1982	—N/a	86.9	3.5 (0)	48.1 (33)	4.5 (0)	35.7 (Note: Results for AP–PDP.) (24)	4.7 (0)	–	12.4
1979 municipal election	3 Apr 1979	—N/a	66.0	40.3; 25	39.5; 25	14.7; 9	–	–	–	0.8

=== Voting preferences ===
The table below lists raw, unweighted voting preferences.

Polling firm/Commissioner	Fieldwork date	Sample size	UCD	PSOE	PCE	AP–PDP–UL	CDS	PDL	Question	X mark	Lead
1983 municipal election	8 May 1983	—N/a	–	33.7	4.7	26.3	2.1	1.8	—N/a	30.6	7.4
Alef–Emopública/CIS	17–25 Mar 1983	498	–	45.7	4.2	8.7	0.8	0.2	32.6	6.8	37.0
1982 general election	28 Oct 1982	—N/a	3.0	41.1	3.8	30.5	4.1	–	—N/a	13.1	10.6
1979 municipal election	3 Apr 1979	—N/a	26.6	26.1	9.7	–	–	–	—N/a	34.0	0.5

== Results ==
← Summary of the 8 May 1983 City Council of Madrid election results →
Parties and alliances	Popular vote			Seats	
Parties and alliances	Votes	%	±pp	Total	+/−
Spanish Socialist Workers' Party (PSOE)	808,350	48.44	+8.95	30	+5
People's Coalition (AP–PDP–UL)	631,183	37.82	New	23	+23
Communist Party of Spain (PCE)	113,112	6.78	−7.91	4	−5
Democratic and Social Centre (CDS)	50,824	3.05	New	0	±0
Liberal Democratic Party (PDL)	44,159	2.65	New	0	±0
Workers' Socialist Party (PST)	5,721	0.34	New	0	±0
Spanish Communist Workers' Party (PCOE)	3,284	0.20	−0.13	0	±0
Natural Culture (CN)	2,281	0.14	New	0	±0
Revolutionary Communist League (LCR)	1,543	0.09	−0.02	0	±0
Popular Struggle Coalition (CLP)	859	0.05	New	0	±0
Union of the Democratic Centre (UCD)	n/a	n/a	−40.29	0	−25
Blank ballots	7,402	0.44	+0.44		
Total	1,668,718			57	−2
Valid votes	1,668,718	99.03	−0.97		
Invalid votes	16,397	0.97	+0.97		
Votes cast / turnout	1,685,115	70.78	+4.80		
Abstentions	695,731	29.22	−4.80		
Registered voters	2,380,846				

Popular vote
PSOE	48.44%
AP–PDP–UL	37.82%
PCE	6.78%
CDS	3.05%
PDL	2.65%
Others	0.82%
Blank ballots	0.44%

Seats
PSOE	52.63%
AP–PDP–UL	40.35%
PCE	7.02%

== Bibliography ==
- Decreto 1674/1963, de 11 de julio, por el que se aprueba el texto articulado de la Ley que establece un régimen especial para el Municipio de Madrid (PDF) (Decree 1674/1963). Official State Gazette (in Spanish). 11 July 1963. BOE-A-1963-14593.
- Ley 41/1975, de 19 de noviembre, de Bases del Estatuto de Régimen Local (Law 41/1975). Official State Gazette (in Spanish). 19 November 1975. BOE-A-1975-23920.
- Ley 39/1978, de 17 de julio, de elecciones locales (Law 39/1978). Official State Gazette (in Spanish). 17 July 1978. BOE-A-1978-18636.
- Constitución Española (Constitution). Official State Gazette (in Spanish). 27 December 1978 [version as of 29 December 1978]. BOE-A-1978-31229.
- Ley Orgánica 6/1983, de 2 de marzo, por la que se modifican determinados artículos de la Ley 39/1978, de 17 de julio, de Elecciones Locales (Organic Law 6/1983). Official State Gazette (in Spanish). 2 March 1983. BOE-A-1983-6573.
- Real Decreto 448/1983, de 9 de marzo, de convocatoria de Elecciones Locales (Royal Decree 448/1983). Official State Gazette (in Spanish). 9 March 1983. BOE-A-1983-7296.
