= 1991 Madrid municipal election =

Election in the Spanish municipality of Madrid

- 26 May 1991

All 57 seats in the City Council of Madrid 29 seats needed for a majority
- Opinion polls
- Registered: 2,524,947 ▲6.3%
- Turnout: 1,493,617 (59.2%) ▼10.9 pp

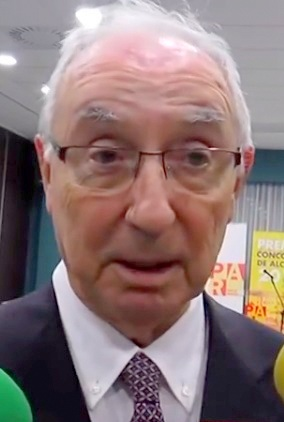
	First party	Second party	Third party
Leader	José María Álvarez del Manzano	Juan Barranco	Francisco Herrera
Party	PP	PSOE	IU
Leader since	10 October 1986	19 January 1986	7 June 1990
Last election	20 seats, 34.0% (Note: Results for AP (33.8%, 20 seats) and PDP (0.2%, 0 seats) in the 1987 election.)	24 seats, 40.5%	3 seats, 6.1%
Seats won	30	21	6
Seat change	▲10	▼3	▲3
Popular vote	702,834	510,556	144,640
Percentage	47.2%	34.3%	9.7%
Swing	▲13.2 pp	▼6.2 pp	▲3.6 pp
	Fourth party
Leader	José Ramón Lasuén
Party	CDS
Leader since	22 March 1991
Last election	8 seats, 15.1%
Seats won	0
Seat change	▼8
Popular vote	43,112
Percentage	2.9%
Swing	▼12.2 pp
Mayor before election
Agustín Rodríguez Sahagún
CDS
Mayor after election
José María Álvarez del Manzano
PP

A municipal election was held in Madrid on 26 May 1991 to elect the 4th City Council of the municipality. All 57 seats in the City Council were up for election. It was held concurrently with regional elections in thirteen autonomous communities and local elections all across Spain.

The People's Party (PP), People's Alliance new electoral brand, went on to win a City Council election in Madrid for the first time with an absolute majority of seats. The Spanish Socialist Workers' Party (PSOE) continued its decline in the city and lost 3 seats and around 150,000 votes, while United Left (IU) recovered from its 1987 debacle and, for the first time since 1979, increased in seats and votes. The ruling Democratic and Social Centre (CDS), whose local leader Agustín Rodríguez Sahagún had announced his intention not to run for re-election, all but disappeared from the council after failing to meet the required 5% threshold.

As a result of the election, José María Álvarez del Manzano was elected Mayor unopposed, a post he would retain until 2003, becoming the longest-serving democratically elected Mayor of Madrid.

== Overview ==
Under the 1978 Constitution, the governance of municipalities in Spain—part of the country's local government system—was centered on the figure of city councils (Spanish: ayuntamientos), local corporations with independent legal personality composed of a mayor, a government council and an elected legislative assembly. The mayor was indirectly elected by the local assembly, requiring an absolute majority; otherwise, the candidate from the most-voted party automatically became mayor (ties were resolved by drawing lots). In the case of Madrid, the top-tier administrative and governing body was the City Council of Madrid.

=== Date ===
The term of local assemblies in Spain expired four years after the date of their previous election, with amendments earlier in 1991 fixing election day for the fourth Sunday of May every four years. The election decree was required to be issued between 54 and 60 days before the scheduled election date and published on the following day in the Official State Gazette (BOE). The previous local elections were held on 10 June 1987, setting the date for election day on the fourth Sunday of May four years later, which was 26 May 1991.

Local assemblies could not be dissolved before the expiration of their term, except in cases of mismanagement that seriously harmed the public interest and implied a breach of constitutional obligations, in which case the Council of Ministers could—optionally—decide to call a by-election.

Elections to the assemblies of local entities were officially called on 2 April 1991 with the publication of the corresponding decree in the BOE, setting election day for 26 May.

=== Electoral system ===
Voting for local assemblies was based on universal suffrage, comprising all Spanish nationals over 18 years of age, registered and residing in the municipality and with full political rights (provided that they had not been deprived of the right to vote by a final sentence, nor were legally incapacitated), as well as resident non-nationals whose country of origin allowed reciprocal voting by virtue of a treaty.

Local councillors were elected using the D'Hondt method and closed-list proportional voting, with a five percent-threshold of valid votes (including blank ballots) in each municipality. Each municipality was a multi-member constituency, with a number of seats based on the following scale:

Population	Councillors
<250	5
251–1,000	7
1,001–2,000	9
2,001–5,000	11
5,001–10,000	13
10,001–20,000	17
20,001–50,000	21
50,001–100,000	25
>100,001	+1 per each 100,000 inhabitants or fraction +1 if total is an even number

The law did not provide for by-elections to fill vacant seats; instead, any vacancies arising after the proclamation of candidates and during the legislative term were filled by the next candidates on the party lists or, when required, by designated substitutes.

== Parties and candidates ==
The electoral law allowed for parties and federations registered in the interior ministry, alliances and groupings of electors to present lists of candidates. Parties and federations intending to form an alliance were required to inform the relevant electoral commission within 10 days of the election call, whereas groupings of electors needed to secure the signature of a determined amount of the electors registered in the municipality for which they sought election, disallowing electors from signing for more than one list. In the case of Madrid, as its population was over 1,000,001, at least 8,000 signatures were required.

Below is a list of the main parties and alliances which contested the election:

Candidacy	Parties and alliances	Leading candidate	Ideology	Previous result		Gov.	Ref.
Candidacy	Parties and alliances	Leading candidate	Ideology	Vote %	Seats	Gov.	Ref.
PSOE	List: Spanish Socialist Workers' Party (PSOE)	Juan Barranco	Social democracy	40.5%	24	No	
PP	List: People's Party (PP)	José María Álvarez del Manzano	Conservatism; Christian democracy	34.0%	20	Yes	
CDS	List: Democratic and Social Centre (CDS)	José Ramón Lasuén	Centrism; Liberalism	15.1%	8	Yes	
IU	List: Communist Party of Madrid (PCM); Socialist Action Party (PASOC); Republican Left (IR)	Francisco Herrera	Socialism; Communism	6.1%	3	No	

== Opinion polls ==
The tables below list opinion polling results in reverse chronological order, showing the most recent first and using the dates when the survey fieldwork was done, as opposed to the date of publication. Where the fieldwork dates are unknown, the date of publication is given instead. The highest percentage figure in each polling survey is displayed with its background shaded in the leading party's colour. If a tie ensues, this is applied to the figures with the highest percentages. The "Lead" column on the right shows the percentage-point difference between the parties with the highest percentages in a poll.

=== Voting intention estimates ===
The table below lists weighted voting intention estimates. Refusals are generally excluded from the party vote percentages, while question wording and the treatment of "don't know" responses and those not intending to vote may vary between polling organisations. When available, seat projections determined by the polling organisations are displayed below (or in place of) the percentages in a smaller font; 29 seats were required for an absolute majority in the City Council of Madrid (28 in the 1987 election).

Polling firm/Commissioner	Fieldwork date	Sample size	Turnout	PSOE	AP	CDS	IU	PDP	PP	ARM	Lead
1991 municipal election	26 May 1991	—N/a	59.2	34.3; 21	(Note: Within PP.)	2.9; 0	9.7; 6		47.2; 30	1.6; 0	12.9
Sigma Dos/El Mundo	19 May 1991	?	?	31.7; 20		5.9; 3	10.6; 6/7		43.3; 27/28	–	11.6
Gruppo/ABC	14–15 May 1991	1,000	?	32.7; 20/21		6.3; 3	10.2; 5/6		42.6; 26/27	4.5; 0/3	9.9
Metra Seis/El Independiente	12 May 1991	?	?	37.3; 23/24		6.0; 3	9.0; 5		40.5; 25/26	–	3.2
Demoscopia/PP	9 May 1991	?	?	31.0– 33.0; 19/21		4.0– 6.0; 0/3	10.0– 12.0; 7/8		43.0– 46.0; 26/28	–	12.0– 13.0
Demoscopia/El País	4–7 May 1991	?	?	32.9; 21/22		5.0; 0/3	11.5; 7		41.5; 26/28	–	8.6
Gruppo/ABC	26 Apr–2 May 1991	1,000	?	33.6; 21		3.8; 0	9.3; 5/6		43.4; 27/28	5.4; 3	9.8
PP	12 Mar 1991	?	?	31.0		–	–		42.0	–	11.0
Demoscopia/Telemadrid	20 Oct 1990	?	?	39.0		17.8	–		33.0	–	6.0
1989 general election	29 Oct 1989	—N/a	73.1	29.9 (18)		10.6 (6)	14.5 (8)		39.0 (23)	0.9 (0)	10.1
1989 EP election	15 Jun 1989	—N/a	59.2	32.2 (21)		8.7 (5)	7.6 (4)		32.1 (21)	6.8 (4)	0.1
1987 municipal election	10 Jun 1987	—N/a	70.1	40.5; 24	33.8; 20	15.1; 8	6.1; 3	0.2; 0	–	–	6.7

== Results ==
← Summary of the 26 May 1991 City Council of Madrid election results →
Parties and alliances	Popular vote			Seats	
Parties and alliances	Votes	%	±pp	Total	+/−
People's Party (PP)^{1}	702,834	47.23	+13.24	30	+10
Spanish Socialist Workers' Party (PSOE)	510,556	34.31	−6.16	21	−3
United Left (IU)	144,640	9.72	+3.61	6	+3
Democratic and Social Centre (CDS)	43,112	2.90	−12.15	0	−8
Ruiz-Mateos Group (ARM)	23,404	1.57	New	0	±0
The Greens (LV)	18,947	1.27	+0.59	0	±0
The Ecologists (LE)	5,051	0.34	New	0	±0
Green Union (UVE)^{2}	4,335	0.29	−0.01	0	±0
Workers' Socialist Party (PST)	2,949	0.20	New	0	±0
Madrilenian Independent Regional Party (PRIM)	2,610	0.18	New	0	±0
Party of Madrid (PAM)	2,393	0.16	New	0	±0
Spanish Phalanx of the CNSO (FE–JONS)	1,962	0.13	−0.15	0	±0
Citizen Independent Group Gray Panthers (ACI)	1,745	0.12	New	0	±0
Revolutionary Workers' Party of Spain (PORE)	859	0.06	−0.01	0	±0
Left Platform (PCE (m–l)–CRPE)^{3}	740	0.05	−0.03	0	±0
Alliance for the Republic (AxR)^{4}	728	0.05	−0.02	0	±0
Independent Spanish Phalanx (FEI)	605	0.04	New	0	±0
Spanish Catholic Movement (MCE)	581	0.04	New	0	±0
Commoners' Land (TC)	563	0.04	New	0	±0
United Republican Action (ARU)	534	0.04	New	0	±0
Carlist Party (PC)	341	0.02	New	0	±0
Generational Integration (IG)	295	0.02	New	0	±0
Political Natural Power Party (PPNP)	258	0.02	New	0	±0
Blank ballots	18,055	1.21	+0.18		
Total	1,488,097			57	+2
Valid votes	1,488,097	99.63	+0.75		
Invalid votes	5,520	0.37	−0.75		
Votes cast / turnout	1,493,617	59.15	−10.91		
Abstentions	1,031,330	40.85	+10.91		
Registered voters	2,524,947				
Sources
Footnotes: ^{1} People's Party results are compared to the combined totals of People's Alliance and People's Democratic Party in the 1987 election.; ^{2} Green Union results are compared to Confederation of the Greens totals in the 1987 election.; ^{3} Left Platform results are compared to Republican Popular Unity totals in the 1987 election.; ^{4} Alliance for the Republic results are compared to Internationalist Socialist Workers' Party totals in the 1987 election.

Popular vote
PP	47.23%
PSOE	34.31%
IU	9.72%
CDS	2.90%
ARM	1.57%
LV	1.27%
Others	1.78%
Blank ballots	1.21%

Seats
PP	52.63%
PSOE	36.84%
IU	10.53%

== Aftermath ==
=== Government formation ===
Investiture
Ballot →	5 July 1991	
Required majority →	29 out of 57	
José María Álvarez del Manzano (PP): • PP (30)	30 / 57	check
Juan Barranco (PSOE): • PSOE (21)	21 / 57	X mark
Francisco Herrera (IU): • IU (6)	6 / 57	X mark
Abstentions/Blank ballots	0 / 57	
Absentees	0 / 57	

== Bibliography ==
- Decreto 1674/1963, de 11 de julio, por el que se aprueba el texto articulado de la Ley que establece un régimen especial para el Municipio de Madrid (PDF) (Decree 1674/1963). Official State Gazette (in Spanish). 11 July 1963. BOE-A-1963-14593.
- Constitución Española (Constitution). Official State Gazette (in Spanish). 27 December 1978 [version as of 29 December 1978]. BOE-A-1978-31229.
- Ley 7/1985, de 2 de abril, Reguladora de las Bases del Régimen Local (Law 7/1985). Official State Gazette (in Spanish). 2 April 1985 [version as of 27 March 1991]. BOE-A-1985-5392.
- Ley Orgánica 5/1985, de 19 de junio, del Régimen Electoral General (Organic Law 5/1985). Official State Gazette (in Spanish). 19 June 1985 [version as of 14 March 1991]. BOE-A-1985-11672.
- Real Decreto 391/1991, de 1 de abril, de convocatoria de elecciones locales (Royal Decree 391/1991). Official State Gazette (in Spanish). 1 April 1991. BOE-A-1991-7959.
