= 1987 Madrid municipal election =

Election in the Spanish municipality of Madrid

- 10 June 1987

All 55 seats in the City Council of Madrid 28 seats needed for a majority
- Opinion polls
- Registered: 2,376,010 ▼0.2%
- Turnout: 1,664,580 (70.1%) ▼0.7 pp

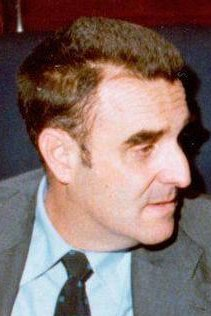

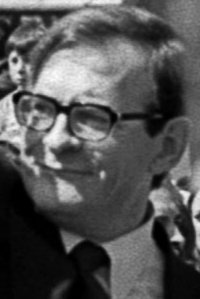

	First party	Second party	Third party
Leader	Juan Barranco	José María Álvarez del Manzano	Agustín Rodríguez Sahagún
Party	PSOE	AP	CDS
Leader since	22 January 1986	10 October 1986	29 April 1987
Last election	30 seats, 48.4%	15 seats (CP) (Note: Within the AP–PDP–UL alliance in the 1983 election: AP (15 seats), PDP (5 seats) and UL/PL (3 seats).)	0 seats, 3.0%
Seats won	24	20	8
Seat change	▼6	▲5	▲8
Popular vote	666,199	555,599	247,773
Percentage	40.5%	33.8%	15.1%
Swing	▼7.9 pp	n/a	▲12.1 pp
	Fourth party	Fifth party
Leader	Ramón Tamames	Javier González-Estéfani
Party	IU	PDP
Leader since	19 December 1986	31 March 1987
Last election	4 seats, 6.8% (Note: Results for PCE in the 1983 election.)	5 seats (CP)
Seats won	3	0
Seat change	▼1	▼5
Popular vote	100,514	3,727
Percentage	6.1%	0.2%
Swing	▼0.7 pp	n/a
Mayor before election
Juan Barranco
PSOE
Mayor after election
Juan Barranco
PSOE

A municipal election was held in Madrid on 10 June 1987 to elect the 3rd City Council of the municipality. All 55 seats in the City Council were up for election. It was held concurrently with regional elections in thirteen autonomous communities and local elections all across Spain, as well as the 1987 European Parliament election.

The Spanish Socialist Workers' Party (PSOE) won the election, but lost its absolute majority and lost 137,000 votes compared to 1983. The People's Alliance (AP), which stood separately after the breakup of the People's Coalition in 1986, failed to meet the level of support reached by the coalition in 1983 and also lost votes and seats. Benefitting from both parties' losses was the Democratic and Social Centre (CDS), which, with its 8 seats and 15% of the votes, entered the City Council for its first and only time and went on to hold the balance of power. United Left (IU), an electoral coalition comprising the Communist Party of Spain and other left-wing parties, continued on its long-term decline and lost 1 more seat, barely obtaining 100,000 votes and 6% of the share.

AP and CDS together reached an absolute majority, but failure on reaching an agreement resulted in Socialist Juan Barranco being re-elected as mayor. However, in June 1989, both parties agreed to present a motion of censure on Barranco and elect Agustín Rodríguez Sahagún from the CDS as new mayor, ousting the PSOE from power in the city after a 10-year rule.

== Overview ==
Under the 1978 Constitution, the governance of municipalities in Spain—part of the country's local government system—was centered on the figure of city councils (Spanish: ayuntamientos), local corporations with independent legal personality composed of a mayor, a government council and an elected legislative assembly. The mayor was indirectly elected by the local assembly, requiring an absolute majority; otherwise, the candidate from the most-voted party automatically became mayor (ties were resolved by drawing lots). In the case of Madrid, the top-tier administrative and governing body was the City Council of Madrid.

=== Date ===
The term of local assemblies in Spain expired four years after the date of their previous election. The election decree was required to be issued no later than 25 days prior to the scheduled expiration date of the assemblies and published on the following day in the Official State Gazette (BOE), with election day taking place between 54 and 60 days after the decree's publication. The previous local elections were held on 8 May 1983, which meant that the chambers' terms would have expired on 8 May 1987. The election decree was required to be published in the BOE no later than 14 April 1987, setting the latest possible date for election day on 13 June 1987.

Local assemblies could not be dissolved before the expiration of their term, except in cases of mismanagement that seriously harmed the public interest and implied a breach of constitutional obligations, in which case the Council of Ministers could—optionally—decide to call a by-election.

Elections to the assemblies of local entities were officially called on 14 April 1987 with the publication of the corresponding decree in the BOE, setting election day for 10 June.

=== Electoral system ===
Voting for local assemblies was based on universal suffrage, comprising all Spanish nationals over 18 years of age, registered and residing in the municipality and with full political rights (provided that they had not been deprived of the right to vote by a final sentence, nor were legally incapacitated), as well as resident non-nationals whose country of origin allowed reciprocal voting by virtue of a treaty.

Local councillors were elected using the D'Hondt method and closed-list proportional voting, with a five percent-threshold of valid votes (including blank ballots) in each municipality. Each municipality was a multi-member constituency, with a number of seats based on the following scale:

Population	Councillors
<250	5
251–1,000	7
1,001–2,000	9
2,001–5,000	11
5,001–10,000	13
10,001–20,000	17
20,001–50,000	21
50,001–100,000	25
>100,001	+1 per each 100,000 inhabitants or fraction +1 if total is an even number

The law did not provide for by-elections to fill vacant seats; instead, any vacancies arising after the proclamation of candidates and during the legislative term were filled by the next candidates on the party lists or, when required, by designated substitutes.

== Parties and candidates ==
The electoral law allowed for parties and federations registered in the interior ministry, alliances and groupings of electors to present lists of candidates. Parties and federations intending to form an alliance were required to inform the relevant electoral commission within 10 days of the election call, whereas groupings of electors needed to secure the signature of a determined amount of the electors registered in the municipality for which they sought election, disallowing electors from signing for more than one list. In the case of Madrid, as its population was over 1,000,001, at least 8,000 signatures were required.

Below is a list of the main parties and alliances which contested the election:

Candidacy	Parties and alliances	Leading candidate	Ideology	Previous result		Gov.	Ref.
Candidacy	Parties and alliances	Leading candidate	Ideology	Vote %	Seats	Gov.	Ref.
PSOE	List: Spanish Socialist Workers' Party (PSOE)	Juan Barranco	Social democracy	48.4%	30	Yes	
AP	List: People's Alliance (AP)	José María Álvarez del Manzano	Conservatism; National conservatism	37.8%	23	No	
PDP	List: People's Democratic Party (PDP)	Javier González-Estéfani	Christian democracy	37.8%	23	No	
IU	List: Communist Party of Madrid (PCM); Socialist Action Party (PASOC); Communist Party of the Peoples of Spain (PCPE); Progressive Federation (FP); Republican Left (IR)	Ramón Tamames	Socialism; Communism	6.8%	4	No	
CDS	List: Democratic and Social Centre (CDS)	Agustín Rodríguez Sahagún	Centrism; Liberalism	3.0%	0	No	

The Liberal Party (PL), which had contested the previous election within the People's Coalition as the Liberal Union (UL), chose not to field any candidates.

== Opinion polls ==
The tables below list opinion polling results in reverse chronological order, showing the most recent first and using the dates when the survey fieldwork was done, as opposed to the date of publication. Where the fieldwork dates are unknown, the date of publication is given instead. The highest percentage figure in each polling survey is displayed with its background shaded in the leading party's colour. If a tie ensues, this is applied to the figures with the highest percentages. The "Lead" column on the right shows the percentage-point difference between the parties with the highest percentages in a poll.

=== Voting intention estimates ===
The table below lists weighted voting intention estimates. Refusals are generally excluded from the party vote percentages, while question wording and the treatment of "don't know" responses and those not intending to vote may vary between polling organisations. When available, seat projections determined by the polling organisations are displayed below (or in place of) the percentages in a smaller font; 28 seats were required for an absolute majority in the City Council of Madrid (29 in the 1983 election).

Polling firm/Commissioner	Fieldwork date	Sample size	Turnout	PSOE	AP–PDP–PL	IU	CDS	AP	PDP	PTE–UC	Lead
1987 municipal election	10 Jun 1987	—N/a	70.1	40.5; 24	–	6.1; 3	15.1; 8	33.8; 20	0.2; 0	1.5; 0	6.7
Gallup/Ya	4 Jun 1987	2,477	74.1	38.6; 22	–	7.7; 4/5	15.7; 9	33.6; 19/20	–	2.7; 0	5.0
Sigma Dos/Diario 16	4 Jun 1987	?	?	? 26/29	–	? 5	? 6/7	? 17/19	–	–	?
DYM/Cambio 16	4 Jun 1987	?	?	? 28	–	? 6	? 8	? 13	–	–	?
Demoscopia/El País	22–26 May 1987	?	73	38.2; 22	–	8.5; 4	19.2; 11	31.0; 18	1.1; 0	–	7.2
CIS	8–16 May 1987	1,593	?	47.9; 29	–	5.5; 3	12.2; 7	26.3; 16	–	–	21.6
1986 general election	22 Jun 1986	—N/a	73.4	37.3 (22)	36.0 (22)	5.7 (3)	13.7 (8)	(Note: Within AP–PDP–UL/AP–PDP–PL.)		2.3 (0)	1.3
1983 municipal election	8 May 1983	—N/a	70.8	48.4; 30	37.8; 23	6.8; 4	3.0; 0			–	10.6

== Results ==
← Summary of the 10 June 1987 City Council of Madrid election results →
Parties and alliances	Popular vote			Seats	
Parties and alliances	Votes	%	±pp	Total	+/−
Spanish Socialist Workers' Party (PSOE)	666,199	40.47	−7.97	24	−6
People's Alliance (AP)^{1}	555,599	33.76	n/a	20	+5
Democratic and Social Centre (CDS)	247,773	15.05	+12.00	8	+8
United Left (IU)^{2}	100,514	6.11	−0.67	3	−1
Workers' Party of Spain–Communist Unity (PTE–UC)	25,059	1.52	New	0	±0
The Greens (LV)	11,129	0.68	New	0	±0
Confederation of the Greens (CV)	4,858	0.30	New	0	±0
Spanish Phalanx of the CNSO (FE–JONS)	4,592	0.28	New	0	±0
People's Democratic Party (PDP)^{1}	3,727	0.23	n/a	0	−5
Humanist Platform (PH)	2,475	0.15	New	0	±0
Spanish Juntas (JJEE)	2,362	0.14	New	0	±0
Republican Popular Unity (UPR)^{3}	1,248	0.08	+0.03	0	±0
Revolutionary Workers' Party of Spain (PORE)	1,219	0.07	New	0	±0
Communist Workers' League (LOC)	1,164	0.07	New	0	±0
Internationalist Socialist Workers' Party (POSI)	1,083	0.07	New	0	±0
Liberal Party (PL)^{1}	n/a	n/a	n/a	0	−3
Blank ballots	16,972	1.03	+0.59		
Total	1,645,973			55	−2
Valid votes	1,645,973	98.88	−0.15		
Invalid votes	18,607	1.12	+0.15		
Votes cast / turnout	1,664,580	70.06	−0.72		
Abstentions	711,430	29.94	+0.72		
Registered voters	2,376,010				
Sources
Footnotes: ^{1} Within the People's Coalition alliance in the 1983 election.; ^{2} United Left results are compared to Communist Party of Spain totals in the 1983 election.; ^{3} Republican Popular Unity results are compared to Popular Struggle Coalition totals in the 1983 election.

Popular vote
PSOE	40.47%
AP	33.76%
CDS	15.05%
IU	6.11%
PTE–UC	1.52%
Others	2.06%
Blank ballots	1.03%

Seats
PSOE	43.64%
AP	36.36%
CDS	14.55%
IU	5.45%

== Aftermath ==
=== Government formation ===
Investiture
Ballot →	30 June 1987	
Required majority →	28 out of 55	
Juan Barranco (PSOE): • PSOE (24)	24 / 55	check
José María Álvarez del Manzano (AP): • AP (20)	20 / 55	X mark
Agustín Rodríguez Sahagún (CDS): • CDS (8)	8 / 55	X mark
Abstentions/Blank ballots: • IU (3)	3 / 55	
Absentees	0 / 55	

=== 1989 motion of no confidence ===
Motion of no confidence Nomination of Agustín Rodríguez Sahagún (CDS)
Ballot →	29 June 1989 (Note: 2 IU councillors cast invalid ballots.)
Required majority →	28 out of 55
Yes: • PP (20); • CDS (8); • FP (1)	29 / 55
No: • PSOE (24)	24 / 55
Abstentions	0 / 55
Absentees	0 / 55

== Bibliography ==
- Decreto 1674/1963, de 11 de julio, por el que se aprueba el texto articulado de la Ley que establece un régimen especial para el Municipio de Madrid (PDF) (Decree 1674/1963). Official State Gazette (in Spanish). 11 July 1963. BOE-A-1963-14593.
- Constitución Española (Constitution). Official State Gazette (in Spanish). 27 December 1978 [version as of 29 December 1978]. BOE-A-1978-31229.
- Ley 7/1985, de 2 de abril, Reguladora de las Bases del Régimen Local (Law 7/1985). Official State Gazette (in Spanish). 2 April 1985 [version as of 3 April 1985]. BOE-A-1985-5392.
- Ley Orgánica 5/1985, de 19 de junio, del Régimen Electoral General (Organic Law 5/1985). Official State Gazette (in Spanish). 19 June 1985 [version as of 3 April 1987]. BOE-A-1985-11672.
- Real Decreto 508/1987, de 13 de abril, de convocatoria de elecciones locales (Royal Decree 508/1987). Official State Gazette (in Spanish). 13 April 1987. BOE-A-1987-9222.
