= Timeline of Madrid =

Coordinates: 40°24′N 3°41′W

The following is a timeline of the history of the city of Madrid, Spain.

== Prior to 17th century ==
- Prehistory: Quaternary period or Lower Paleolithic – First archaeological signs of human occupation
- Roman period: mansion or staging-post (Miacum) established
- 5th century AD – archaeological remains reported in 2007 indicate Visigoth occupation
- 9th century – Muhammad I of Córdoba ordered the construction of an Alcazar
- 1085 – Alfonso VI of León and Castile takes the city in the Reconquista.
- 1339 – Treaty of Madrid secures collaboration between Aragon and Castile
- 1499
  - Cardinal Cisneros founded the Complutense University.
  - Fernando de Rojas publishes La Celestina in Madrid
- 1500 – Printing press in operation.
- 1505 – San Jerónimo el Real built.
- 1526 – Treaty of Madrid signed.
- 1537 – Casa de Cisneros built.
- 1547 – Birth of Miguel de Cervantes, later a Spanish writer.
- 1559 – Convent of Las Descalzas Reales founded.
- 1561
  - Court of Philip II moves from Toledo to Madrid.
  - Population: 20,000.
- 1562 – Anton van den Wyngaerde draws a Panorama of Madrid.
- 1584 – Bridge of Segovia built.

== 17th century ==
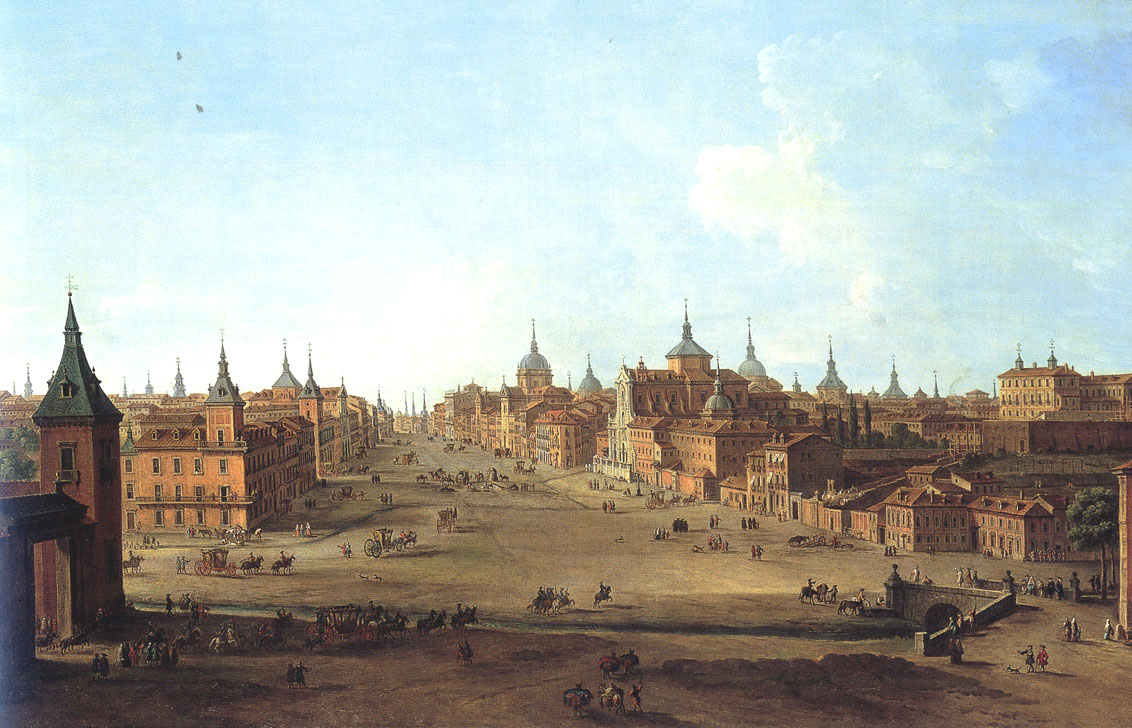
Small bridge in and view of the Paseo del Prado in mid-18th century by Italian painter Antonio Joli

- 1601 – Court of Philip III moves from Madrid to Valladolid.
- 1605 – Cervantes' novel Don Quixote published.
- 1606 – Court of Philip III returns to Madrid.
- 1613 – Palace of the Councils built.
- 1616 – Real Monasterio de la Encarnación inaugurated.
- 1619 – Plaza Mayor laid out; Casa de la Panadería built.
- 1633 – Church of San Antonio de los Alemanes built.
- 1636 – Royal Alcazar built.
- 1637 – Buen Retiro Palace built.
- 1643 – Palacio de Santa Cruz built.
- 1644 – Funeral of Isabel de Borbón.
- 1661 – Gazeta de Madrid begins publication.
- 1664 – San Isidro Church built.
- 1672 – Premiere of Guevara–Hidalgo's zarzuela Celos Hacen Estrellas.

== 18th century ==
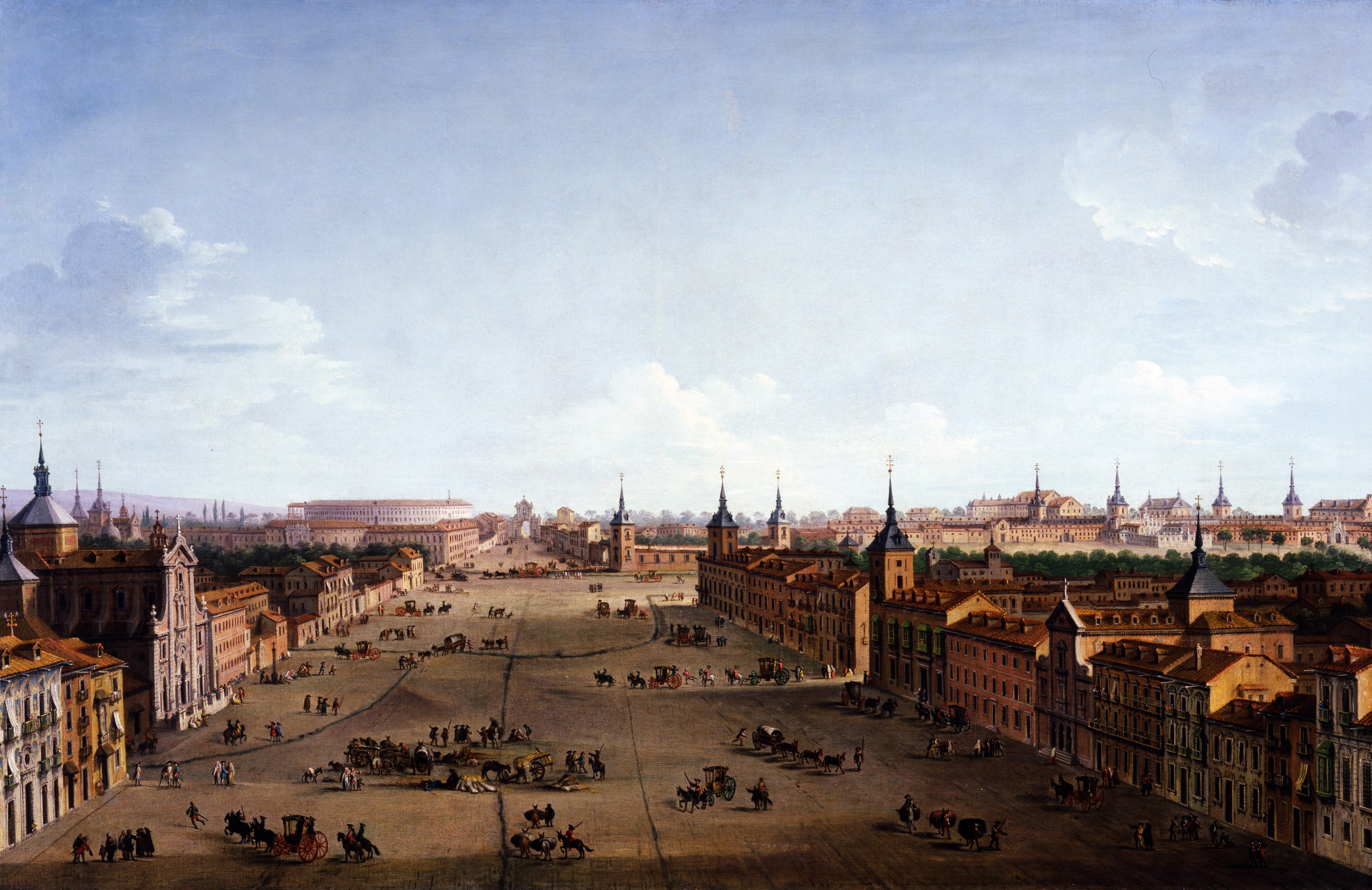
View of Calle de Alcalá in mid-18th century by Italian painter Antonio Joli

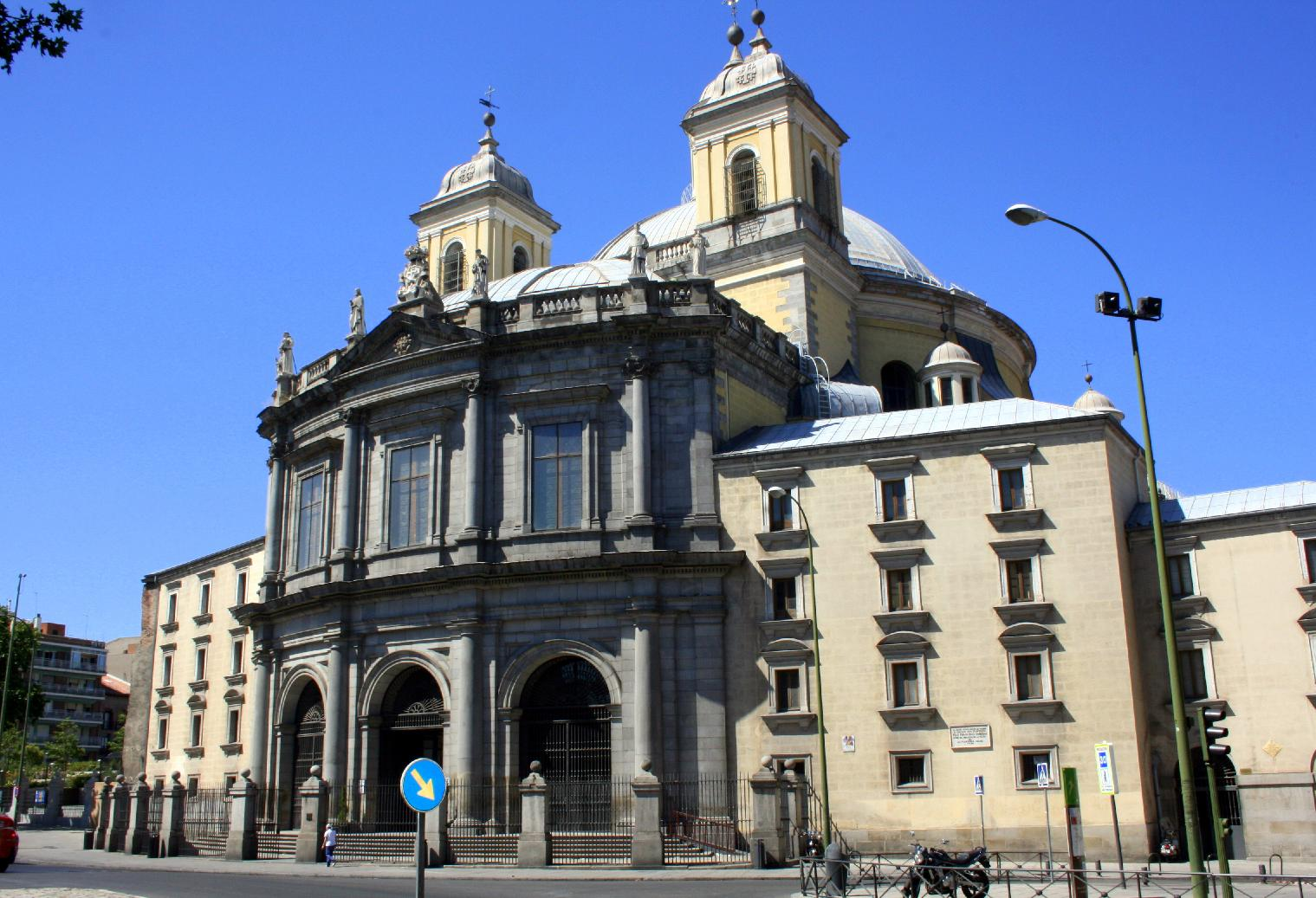
The San Francisco el Grande Basilica was finished in 1784

- 1706 – City occupied by Portuguese.
- 1713 – Royal Spanish Academy founded.
- 1714 – Real Biblioteca del Palacio formed.
- 1734 – Royal Alcazar burns down.
- 1737 – Real Colegio de Profesores Boticarios established.
- 1738 – Real Academia de la Historia founded.
- 1743 – Teatro de la Cruz renovated.
- 1751 – Compañía Guipuzcoana de Caracas headquartered in Madrid.
- 1752 – Real Academia de Bellas Artes de San Fernando founded.
- 1755 – Real Jardín Botánico founded.
- 1756 – Puerta de Recoletos built.
- 1766 – Esquilache Riots.
- 1767 – Buen Retiro Park opens.
- 1774 – Casa de Fieras del Retiro (zoo) opens.
- 1778 – Puerta de Alcalá inaugurated.
- 1782 – Cibeles Fountain built on Plaza de Cibeles.
- 1784 – San Francisco el Grande Basilica built.
- 1790 – Plaza Mayor reconstructed.
- 1798 – Royal Chapel of St. Anthony of La Florida built. Population: 170,000

== 19th century ==
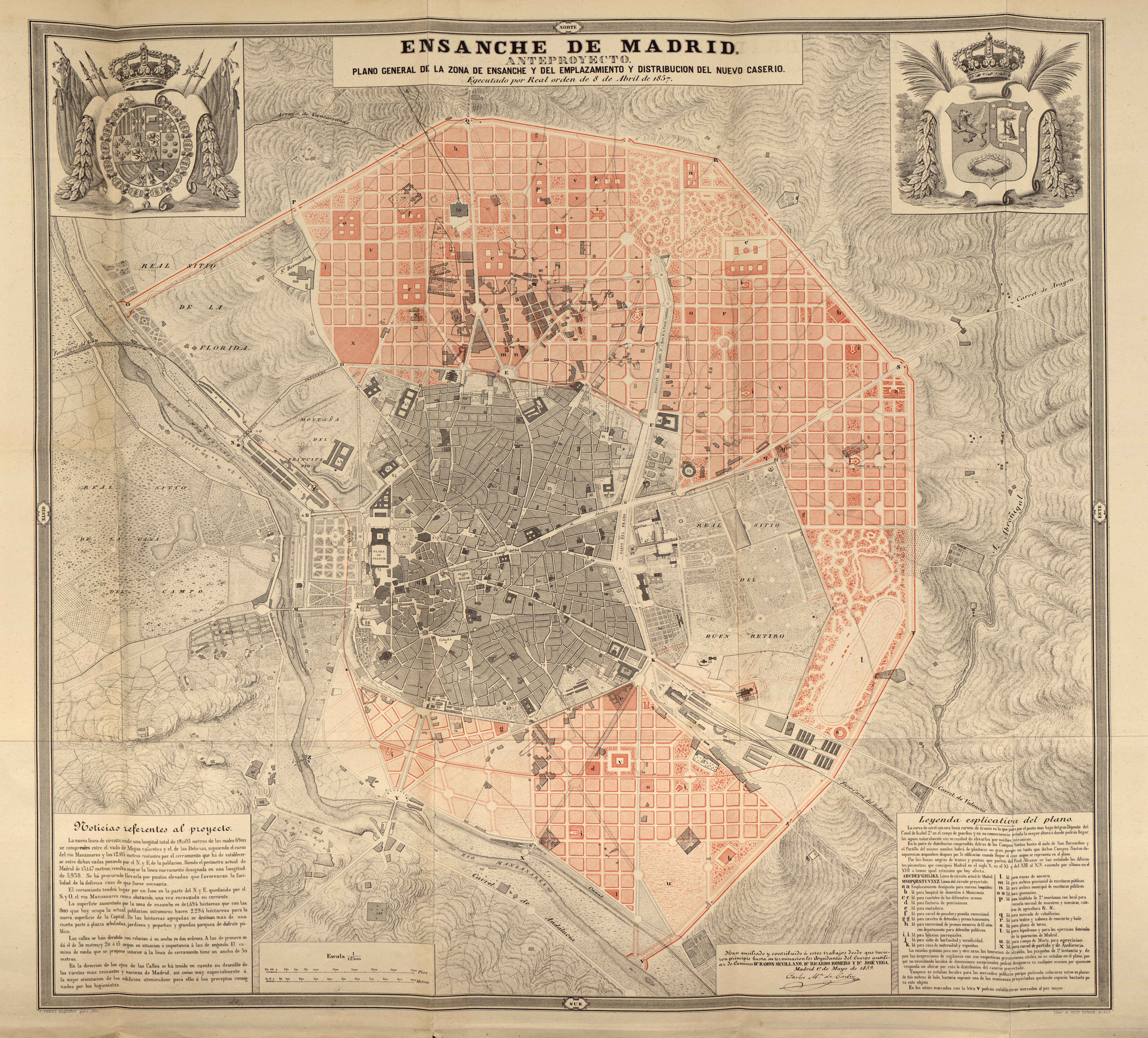
Map of Madrid, 1857

- 1808 – Dos de Mayo Uprising.
- 1812 – Wellington takes city from the French.
- 1817 – Moncloa Porcelain Factory in operation.
- 1819 – Museo del Prado established.
- 1830
  - Royal Conservatory of Music founded.
  - León Gil de Palacio creates a scale model of the city.
- 1831 – Bolsa de Madrid founded.
- 1832 – Lhardy patisserie in business.
- 1835 – Ateneo de Madrid founded.
- 1836
  - Biblioteca Nacional established.
  - Literary University relocates to Madrid.
- 1840 – Monumento a los Caidos por España inaugurated.
- 1843 – Museo Naval de Madrid inaugurated.
- 1850 – Teatro Real opera house opens.
- 1851 – Estación de Mediodía inaugurated.
- 1856
  - Teatro de la Zarzuela opens.
  - Escuela Superior de Diplomática (school) founded.
- 1864 – Hotel Paris opens.
- 1866 – Sociedad de Conciertos de Madrid founded.
- 1867 – National Archaeological Museum of Spain established.
- 1868 – City walls dismantled.
- 1869 – Jardín Zoológico established.
- 1874 – Bull ring constructed on Plaza de Toros.
- 1875 – Museo Nacional de Antropología inaugurated.
- 1877 – Population: 397,816.
- 1884 – Cementerio de la Almudena established.
- 1885
  - Roman Catholic diocese of Madrid established.
  - Theatre of María Guerrero built.
- 1887
  - Café Comercial in business.
  - Palacio de Cristal built.
  - Population: 472,228.
- 1888 – Café Gijón opens.
- 1891 – Bank of Spain Building completed.
- 1892 – Historical American Exposition held.
- 1893 – Fábrica Nacional de Moneda y Timbre formed.
- 1900 – Population: 539,835.

== 20th century ==
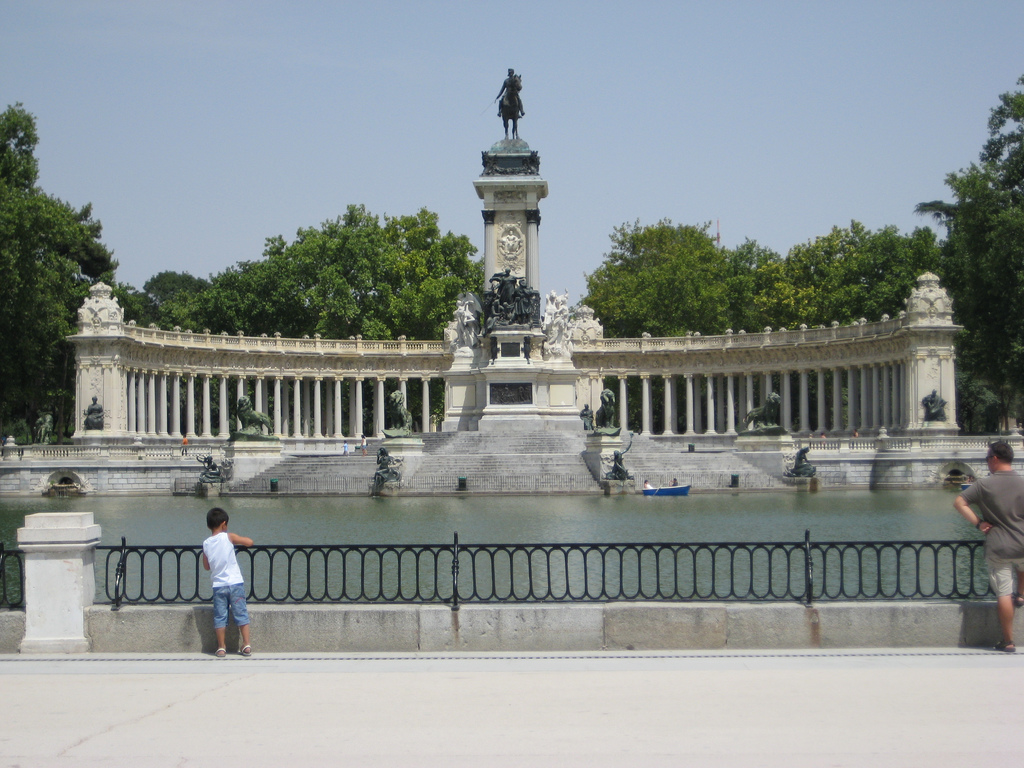
The Monument to Alfonso XII was finished in 1922

- 1902 – Real Madrid C.F. (football club) founded.
- 1903
  - Madrid Symphony Orchestra formed.
  - Atlético de Madrid football club founded.
- 1905 – Parque del Oeste inaugurated.
- 1909 – Cibeles Palace built.
- 1910
  - Museo Nacional de Ciencias Naturales established.
  - Residencia de Estudiantes founded.
- 1911
  - Cuatro Vientos Airport opens.
  - Metropolis Building inaugurated.
- 1912 – Hotel Palace opens.
- 1916 – Market of San Miguel constructed.
- 1919 – Metro begins operating.
- 1920 – Population: 750,896.
- 1922 – Monument to Alfonso XII inaugurated.
- 1923 – Teatro Monumental (theatre) built.
- 1924
  - Line 2 (Madrid Metro) begins operating.
  - Hotel Florida opens.
  - National Museum of Romanticism inaugurated.
- 1925 – Teatro Pavón (theatre) opens.
- 1928 – Catholic Opus Dei founded.
- 1929
  - Gran Vía constructed.
  - Cine Avenida opens.
- 1930
  - Teatro Munoz Seca (theatre) opens.
  - Cine Barceló built.
- 1931
  - City designated capital of Spanish Republic.
  - Madrid-Barajas Airport begins operating.
  - Ministry of Foreign Affairs and Cooperation (Spain) headquartered in Madrid.
- 1932 – Museo Sorolla and Cine Proyecciones (cinema) inaugurated.
- 1934 – Museum of the Spanish Village formed.
- 1935 – House-Museum of Lope de Vega and Cine Madrid-Paris (cinema) open.
- 1936
  - November: Siege of Madrid begins.
  - Line 3 (Madrid Metro) begins operating.
- 1939
  - March: Siege of Madrid ends; Nationalists in power.
  - Capital of Spanish State relocated to Madrid from Burgos.
- 1940
  - Spanish National Orchestra founded.
  - Population: 1,088,647.
- 1941 – Museum of the Americas founded.
- 1944
  - Carabanchel Prison built.
  - Museum Cerralbo opens.
  - Line 4 (Madrid Metro) begins operating.
- 1946 – Estadio Santiago Bernabéu opens.
- 1947 – Municipal bus company EMT Madrid founded.
- 1949 – Cine Pompeya (cinema) opens.
- 1950 – Lope de Vega Theater opens.
- 1951 – Museum of Lázaro Galdiano opens.
- 1953 – Cavalcade of Magi is officially celebrated in Madrid for the first time (unofficial Cavalcades had been celebrated since 1910).
- 1954 – Cine Benlliure (cinema) opens.
- 1956 – Real Madrid wins first European Cup.
- 1960 – Population: 2,259,931.
- 1965 – RTVE Symphony Orchestra formed.
- 1966 – Estadio Vicente Calderón opens.
- 1967 – City flag design adopted.
- 1968
  - Autonomous University of Madrid established.
  - Line 5 (Madrid Metro) begins operating.
- 1969
  - Comillas Pontifical University relocates to Madrid.
  - Eurovision Song Contest 1969 held.
- 1970 – Population: 3,146,071.
- 1971 – Technical University of Madrid formed.
- 1972
  - Zoo Aquarium built.
  - Temple of Debod installed.
- 1973 – Operación Ogro.
- 1974 – Line 7 (Madrid Metro) begins operating.
- 1975 – Dictator Francisco Franco dies in Madrid. Spanish transition to democracy begins.
- 1976 – Torres de Colón built.
- 1977 – Massacre of Atocha.
- 1978
  - Sabatini Gardens open.
  - Centro Dramático Nacional created.
- 1979
  - Enrique Tierno Galván becomes the first mayor of Madrid elected after the restoration of democracy in Spain.
  - Line 6 (Madrid Metro) begins operating.
  - Windsor Tower built.
- 1980
  - La Movida Madrileña begins.
  - Line 9 (Madrid Metro) begins operating.
- 1981
  - An attempted coup d'état takes place in the Congress of Deputies on 23 February.
  - Museo de Aeronáutica y Astronáutica founded.
- 1982
  - City hosts part of the matches of the 1982 FIFA World Cup, including the final, won by Italy.
  - Torrespaña, TVE broadcasting tower, inaugurated.
- 1983
  - November: Avianca Flight 011 accident.
  - December: Alcalá 20 nightclub fire.
- 1984 – Queen Sofía Chamber Orchestra formed.
- 1987 – Community of Madrid Orchestra founded.
- 1988 – National Auditorium of Music inaugurated.
- 1989 – El Mundo begins publication.
- 1990 – Editorial Verbum in business.
- 1991
  - City hosts Israeli–Palestinian peace conference.
  - Population: 2,984,576.
- 1992
  - Madrid–Seville high-speed rail line and Thyssen-Bornemisza Museum open.
  - Museo Nacional Centro de Arte Reina Sofía and Juan Carlos I Park established.
- 1993 – Almudena Cathedral consecrated.
- 1994 – Festimad music festival begins.
- 1996 – Gate of Europe and Islamic Cultural Center of Madrid built.
- 1997 – Teatro Real reopens.
- 1998 – Line 8 (Madrid Metro) and Line 11 (Madrid Metro) begin operating.

== 21st century ==
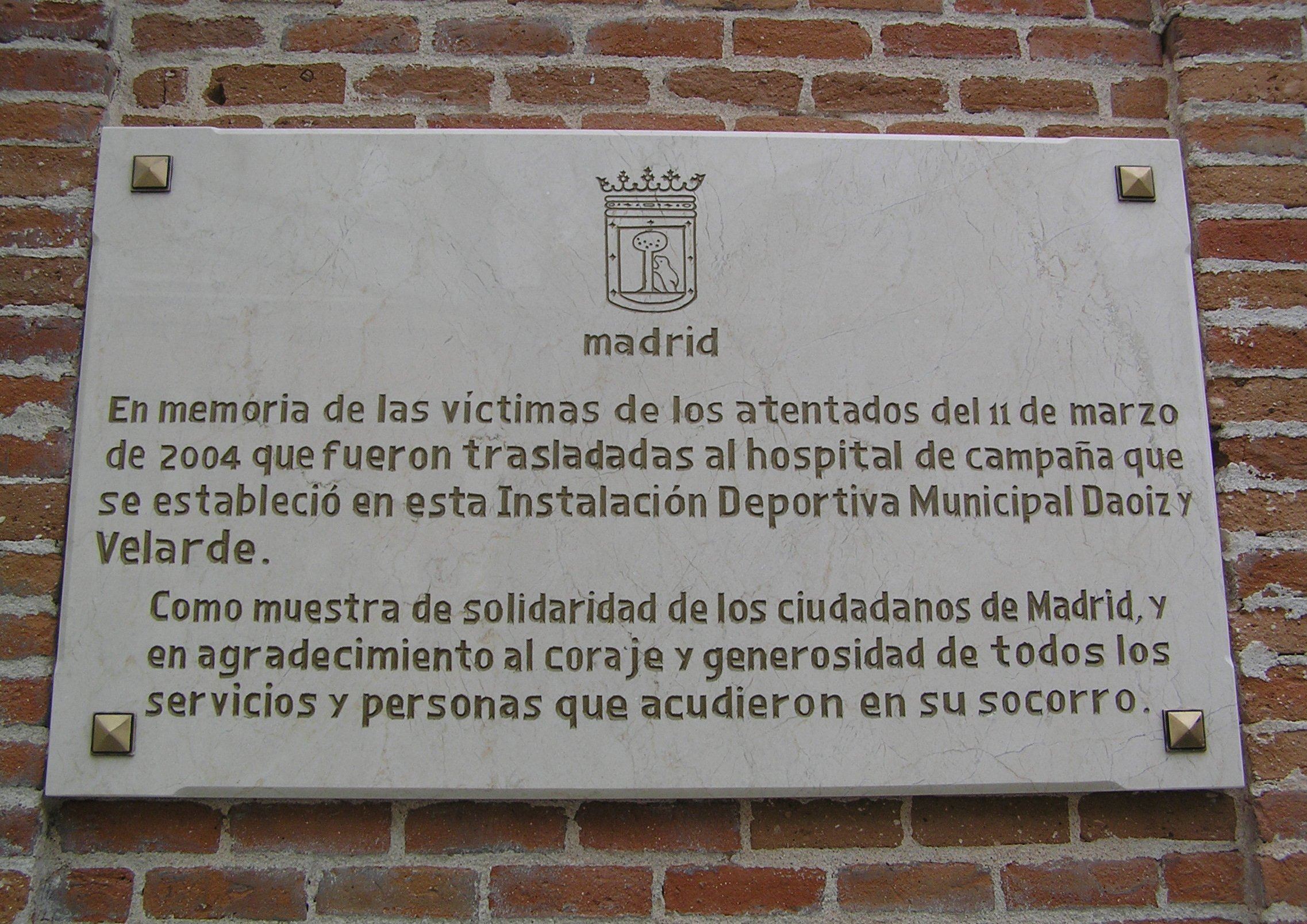
Plaque in memory of the victims of the 2004 Madrid train bombings

- 2001 – City named World Book Capital by UNESCO.
- 2002 – Madrid Arena opens.
- 2003
  - Alberto Ruiz-Gallardón becomes the new mayor, succeeding José María Álvarez del Manzano.
  - Manzanares Park inaugurated.
  - Line 12 (Madrid Metro) begins operating.
- 2004
  - March: Train bombings.
  - Museo del Traje established.
- 2005
  - Windsor Tower suffers a major fire and becomes demolished afterwards.
  - June: Demonstration against ETA.
  - Madrid–Toledo high-speed rail line begins operating.
  - Forest of Remembrance dedicated.
  - Madrid Ballet established.
- 2006
  - Art Madrid contemporary art fair begins.
  - Teatro Valle-Inclán opens.
  - December: Madrid-Barajas Airport bombing.
- 2007 – Metro Ligero begins operating.
- 2008
  - Madrid–Barcelona high-speed rail line begins operating.
  - Spanair Flight 5022 crash.
  - Caixa Forum opens.
  - Torre PwC, Torre Caja Madrid, Torre de Cristal, and Torre Espacio built.
  - Saturday Night Fiber music festival held.
- 2009 – Population: 3,264,497.
- 2011
  - 15-M Movement protests.
  - Parque Madrid Río inaugurated.
  - Ana Botella becomes the new City Mayor after Alberto Ruiz-Gallardón resigns.
- 2012
  - May: Economic protest.
  - November 1: Madrid Arena tragedy: five girls die due to a stampede during a Halloween party.
  - November: Anti-austerity protests.
- 2013 – September: 4th bid for the Summer Olympic Games fails.
- 2014 – After the death of former prime minister Adolfo Suárez, Madrid–Barajas Airport is renamed to Adolfo Suárez Madrid–Barajas.
- 2015
  - March: Parque Felipe VI inaugurated.
  - May: City Council election held; Manuela Carmena elected mayor.
- 2019
  - June: José Luis Martínez-Almeida elected mayor.
- 2021
  - January: Storm Filomena covers Madrid with snow, in a historic snowfall.
  - January: an explosion in a building kills 4 people and wounds 10 other.
- 2024
  - November: Madrid hosts the Junior Eurovision Song Contest 2024, won by Andria Putkaradze from Georgia with the song To My Mom.
- 2026
  - June 6-9: Pope Leo XIV visits Madrid. The events held include a mass at Plaza de Cibeles with nearly one million attendees.
  - September 11-13: Spanish Grand Prix is held at Madring for the first time, with Formula One returning to Madrid for the first time since 1981, when the race was held at Circuito del Jarama for the last time.
  - September 23: Maricarmen Abascal, a 87-year-old woman, is evicted from the rented home where she had lived since 1956. On September 26, more than 25,000 people protested at Puerta del Sol against evictions, with 1,000 of them camping there the following night, resulting in a scene similar to the 15-M protests at the same place fifteen years earlier. The protests against speculation and rent hikes were also replicated in other Spanish cities. After the protests began, Ms. Abascal reached an agreement with the property owner to return to her apartment, but she died in hospital on October 7, before she was able to return home.

== Evolution of the Madrid map ==
=== 17th century ===
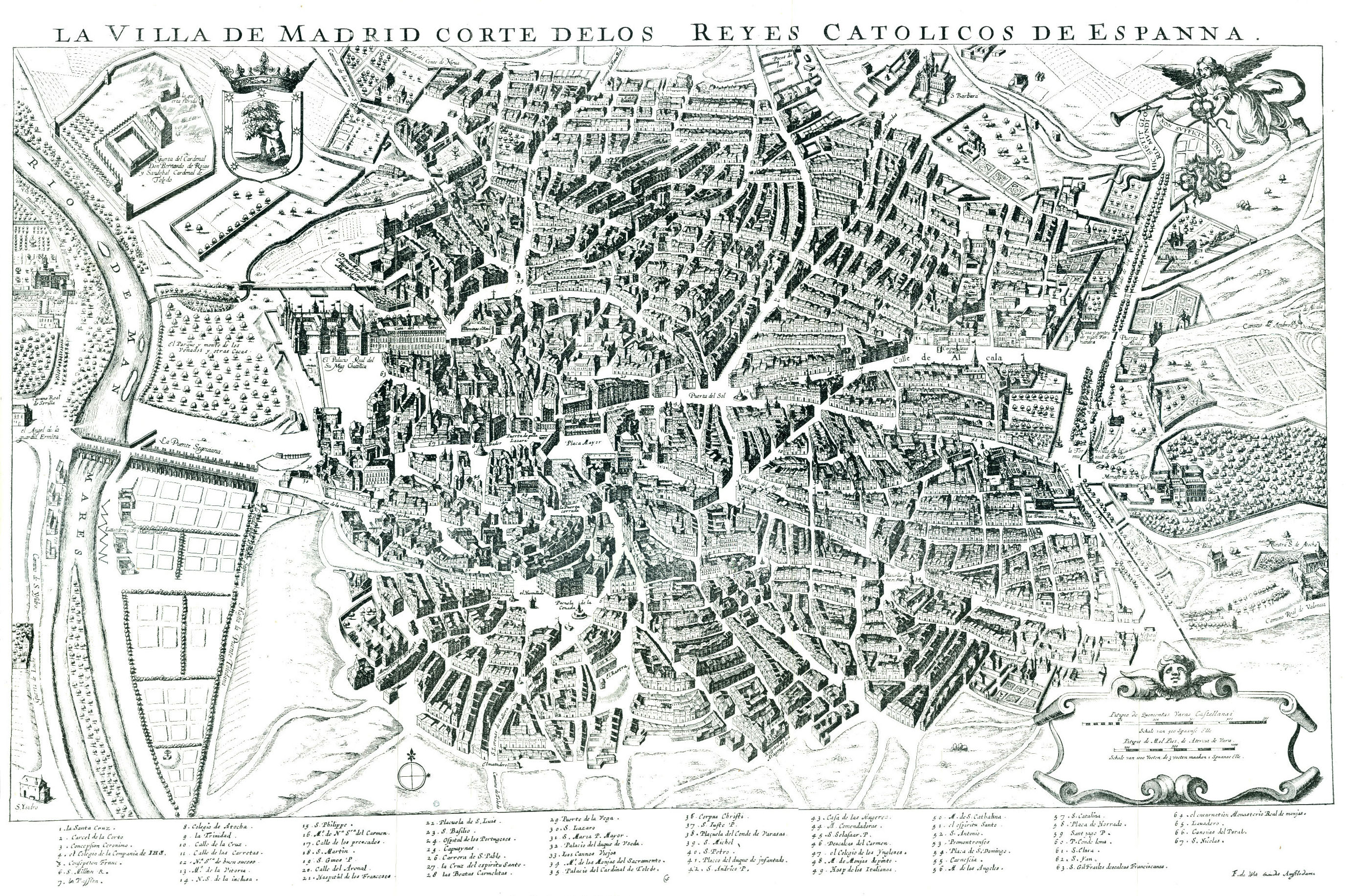
~1622-1635

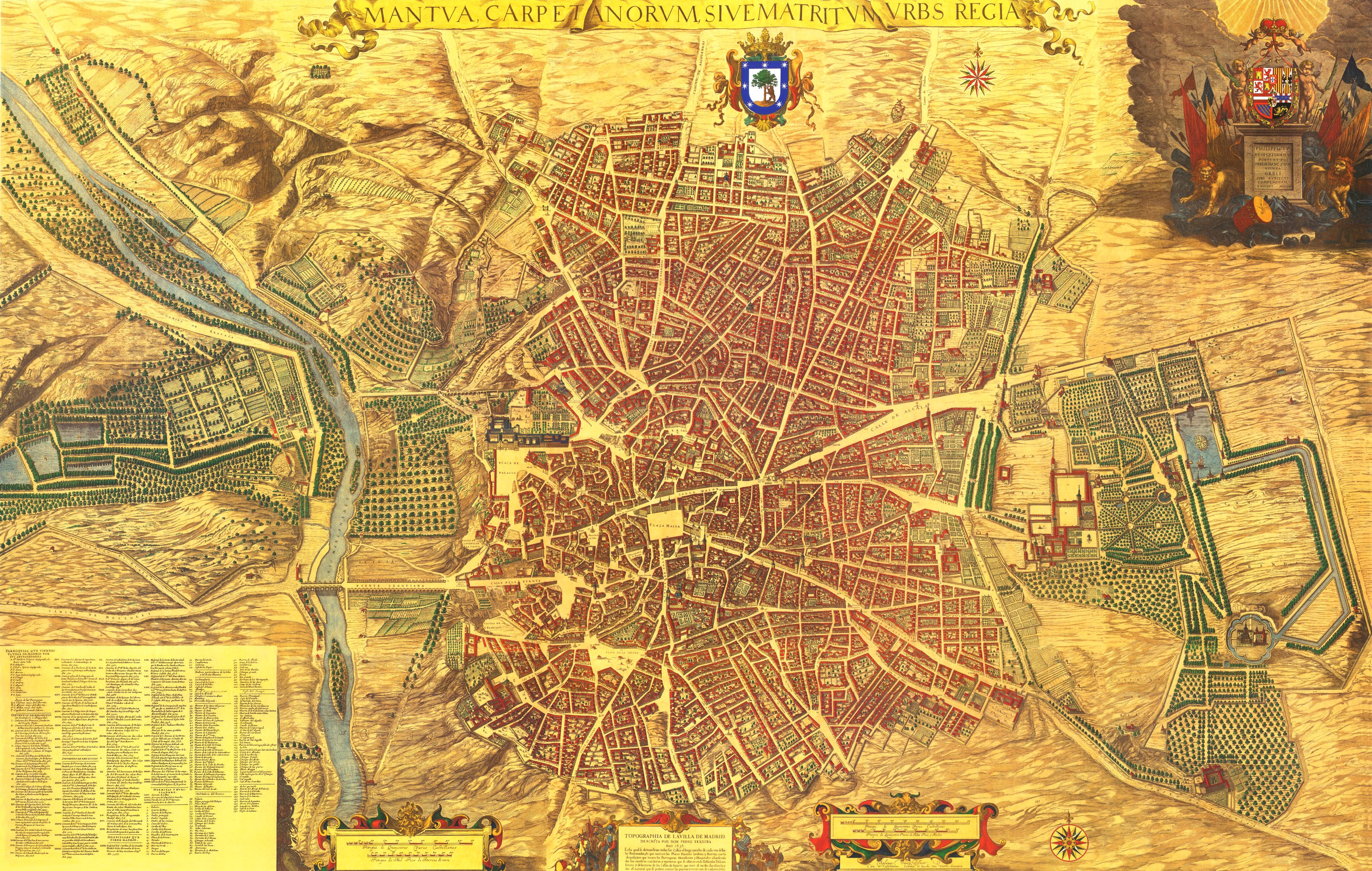
1656

=== 18th century ===
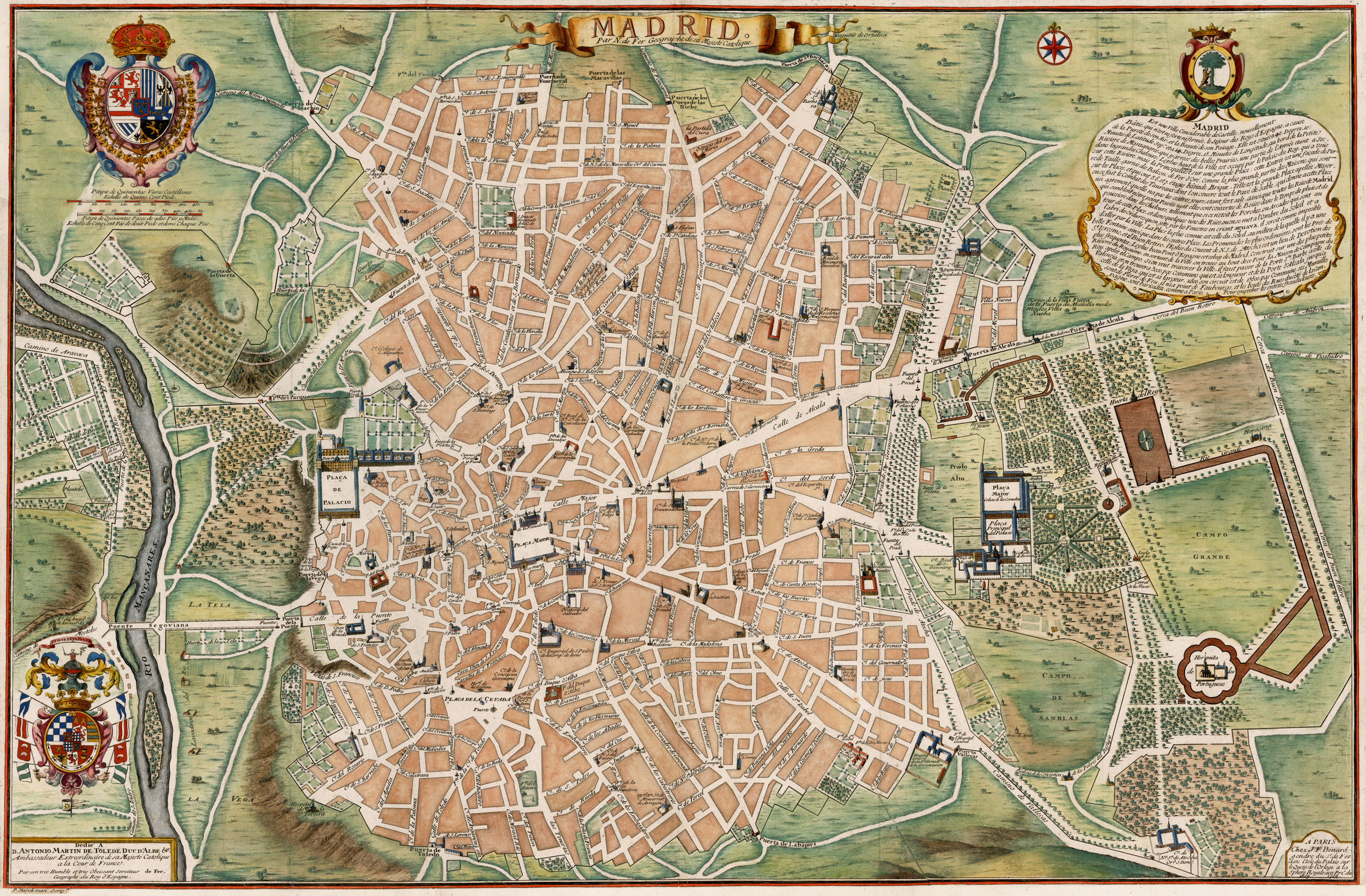
1705-1706

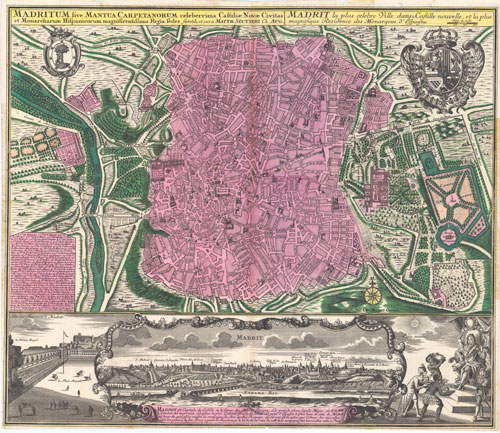
1730

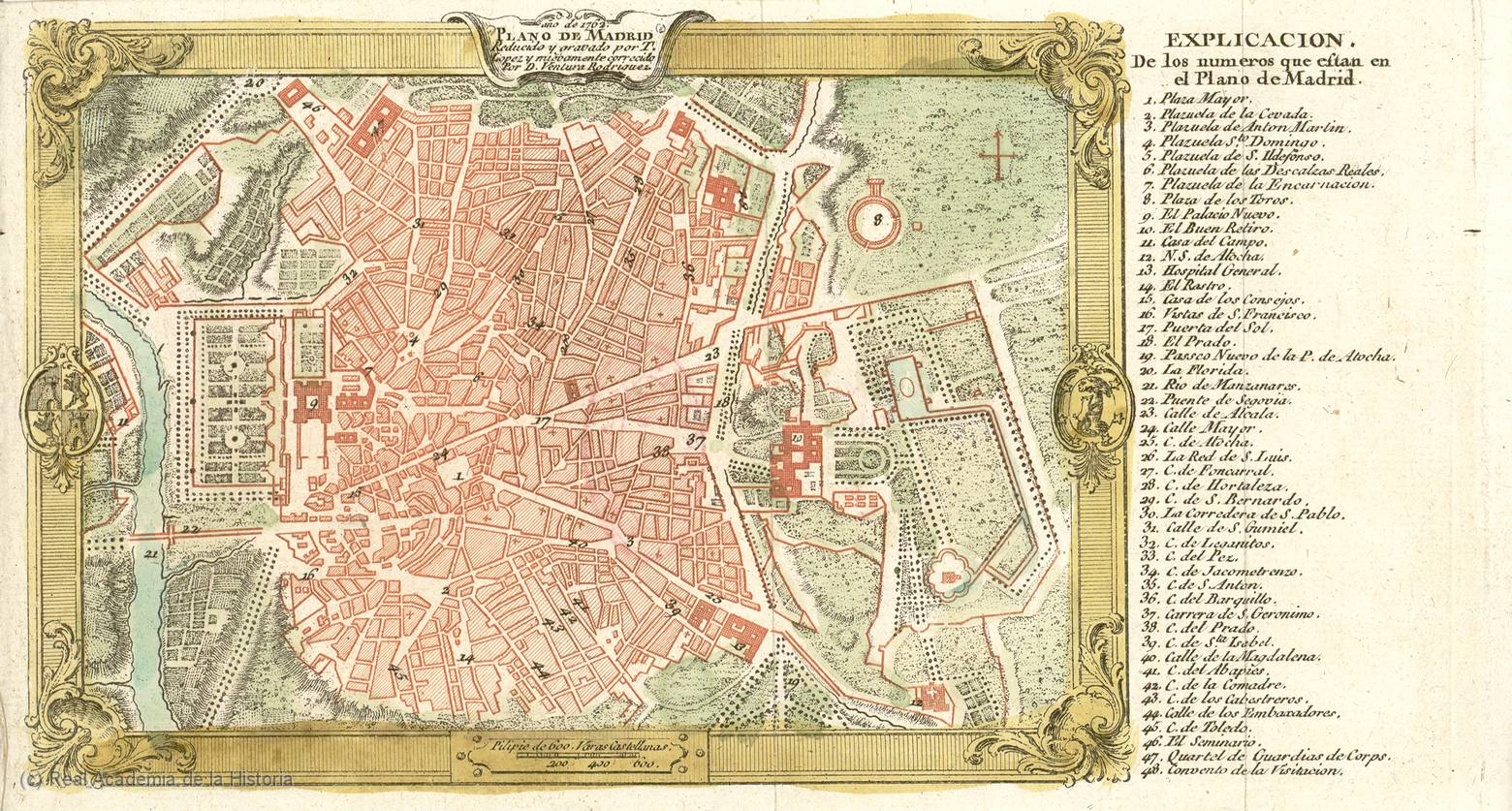
1762

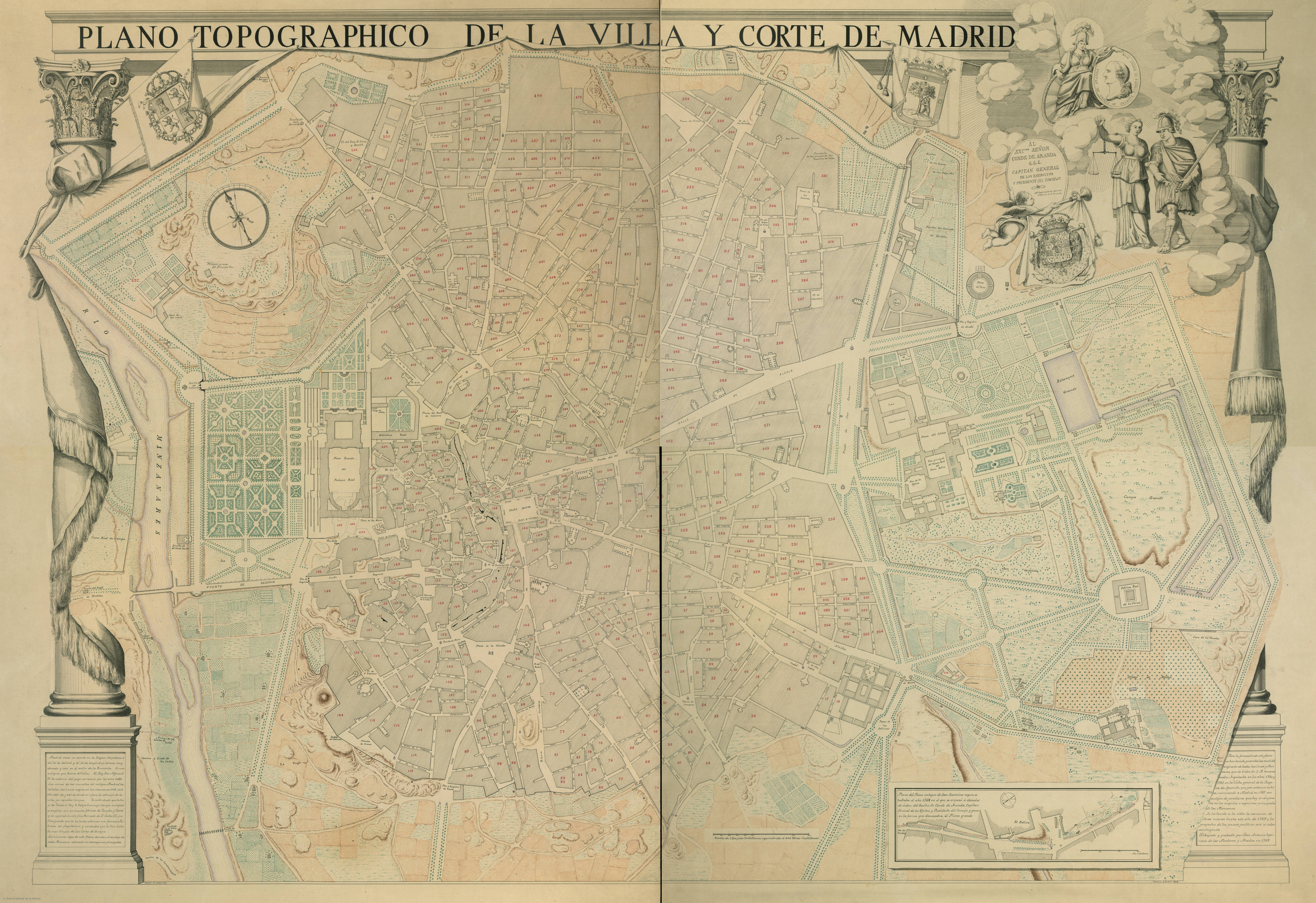
1769

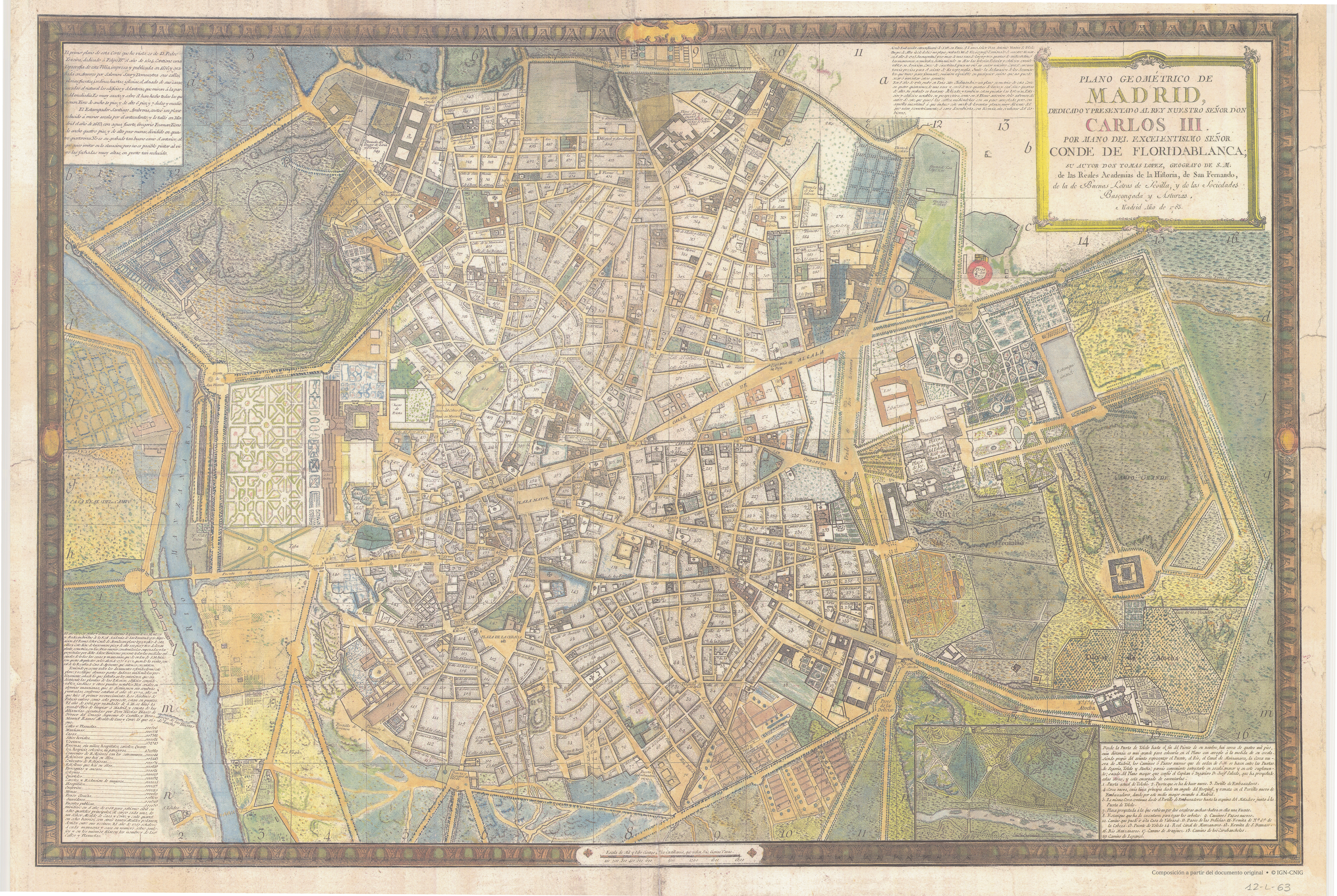
1785

=== 19th century ===
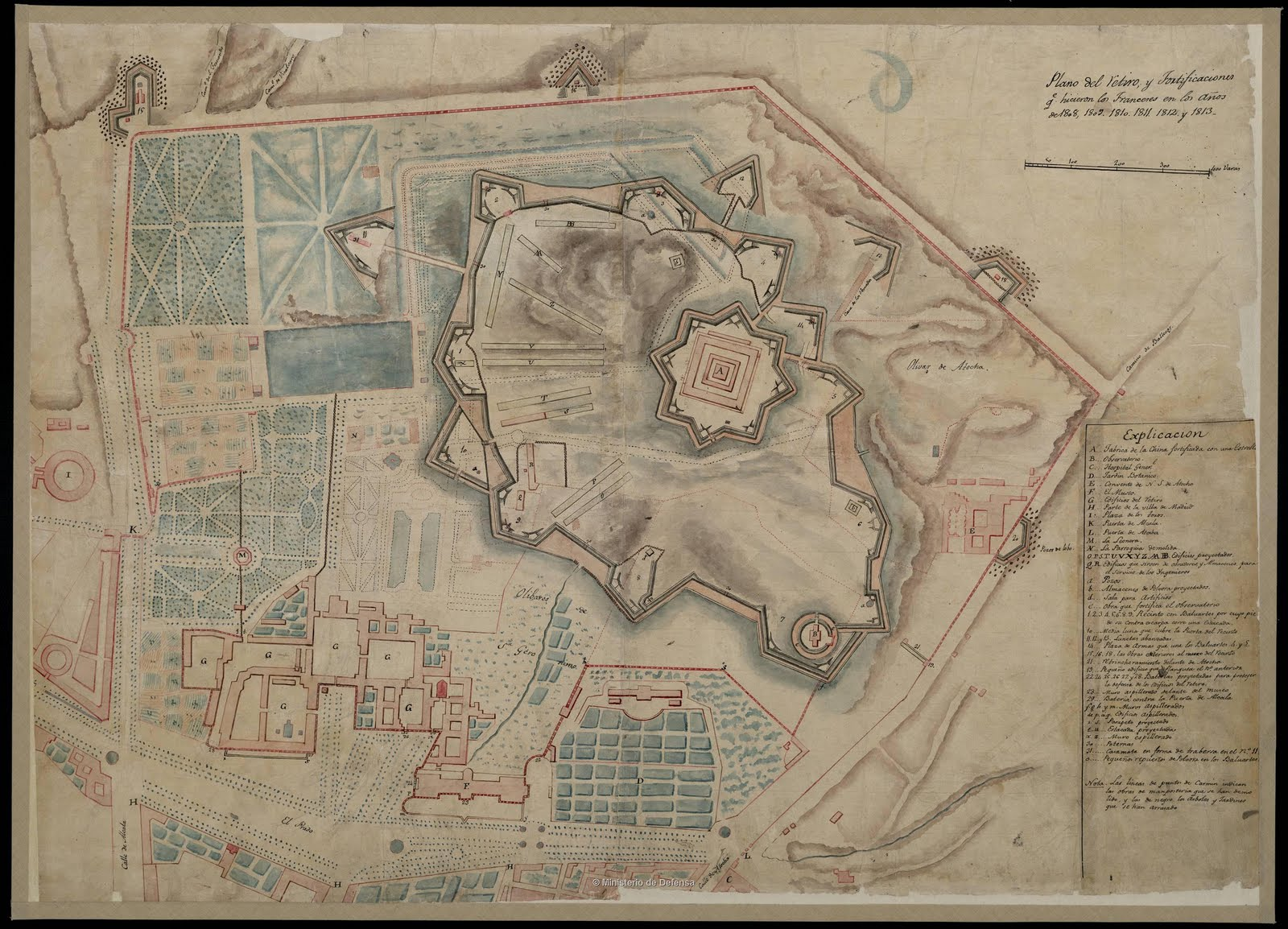
~1813

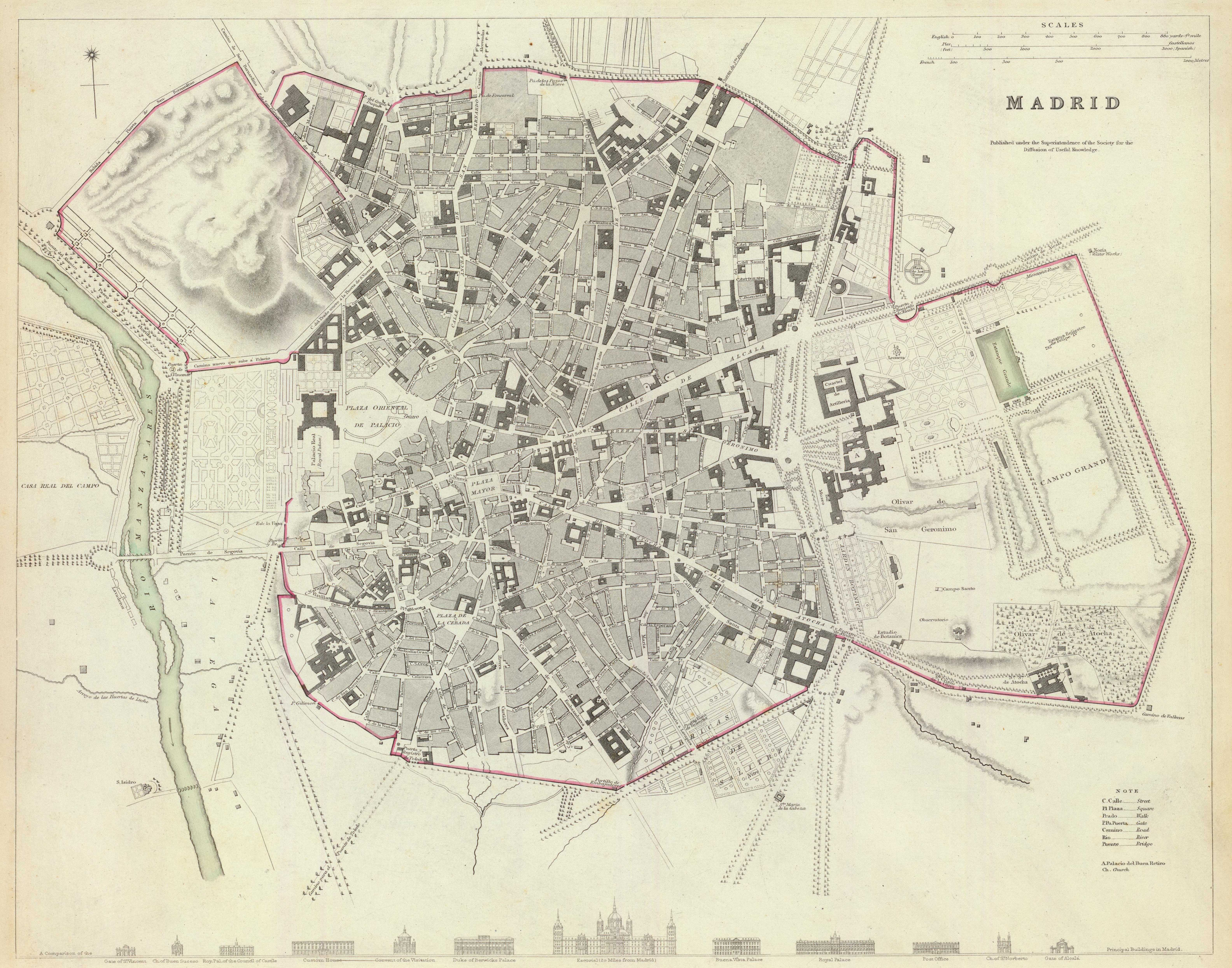
1831

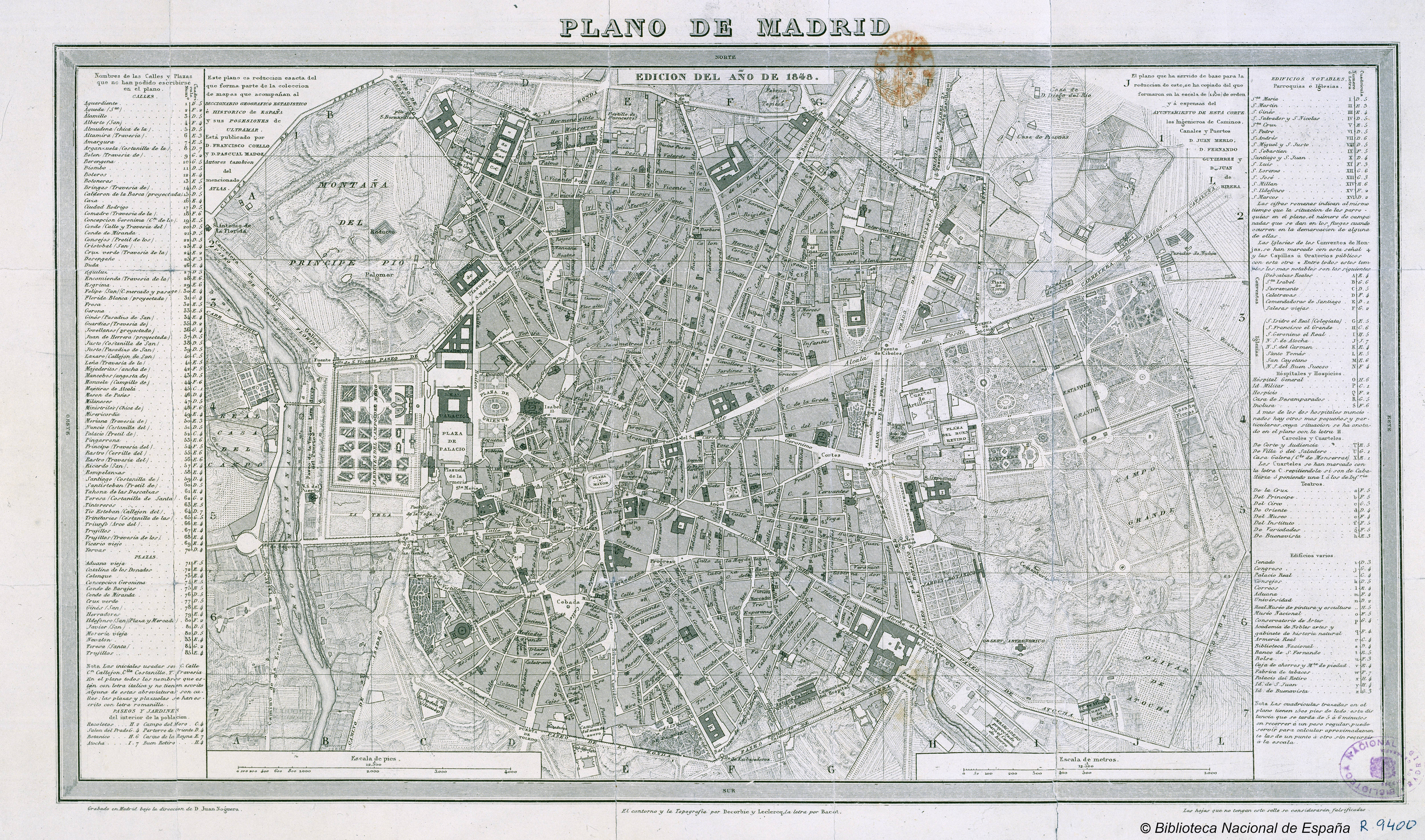
1848

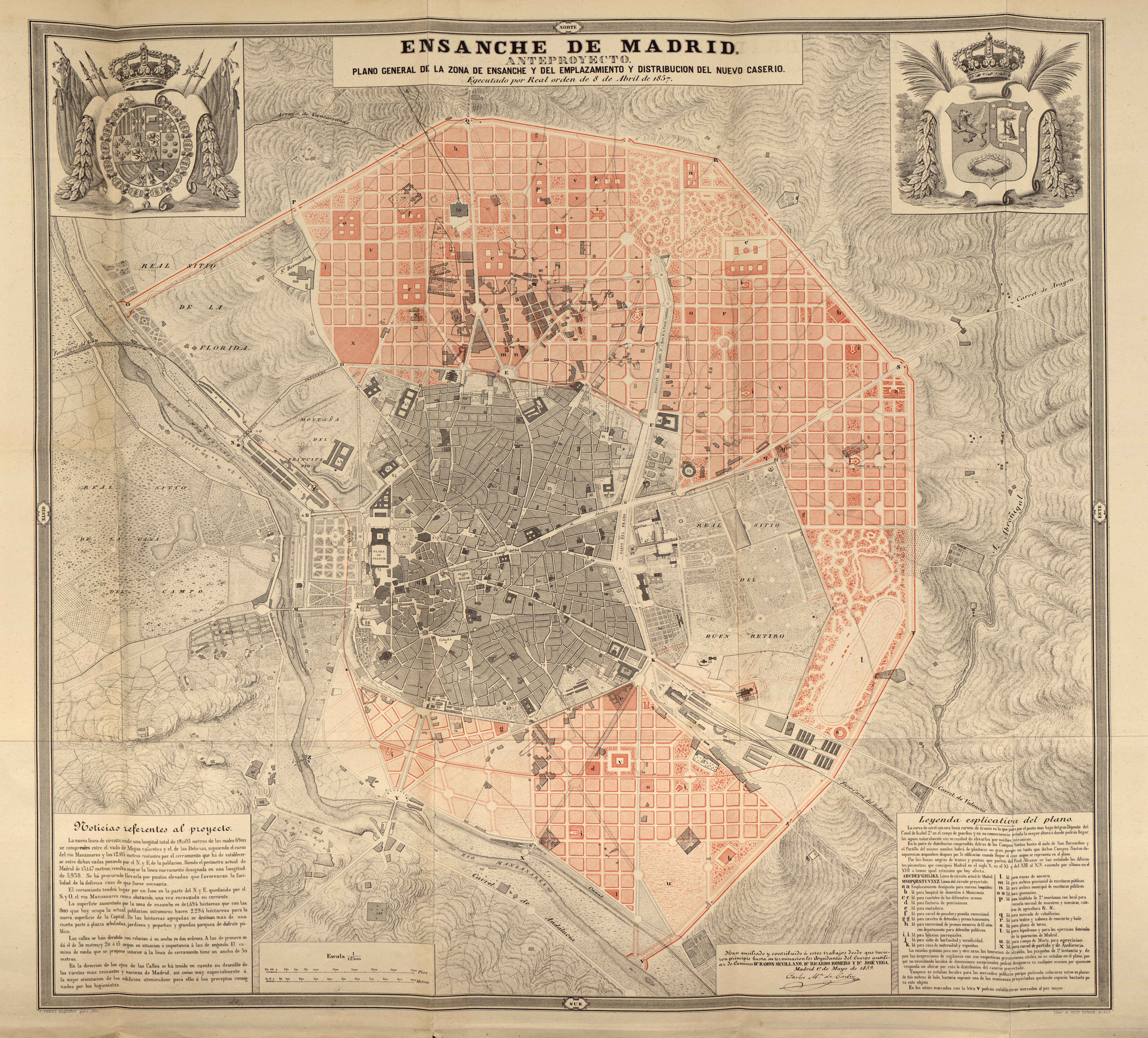
1859

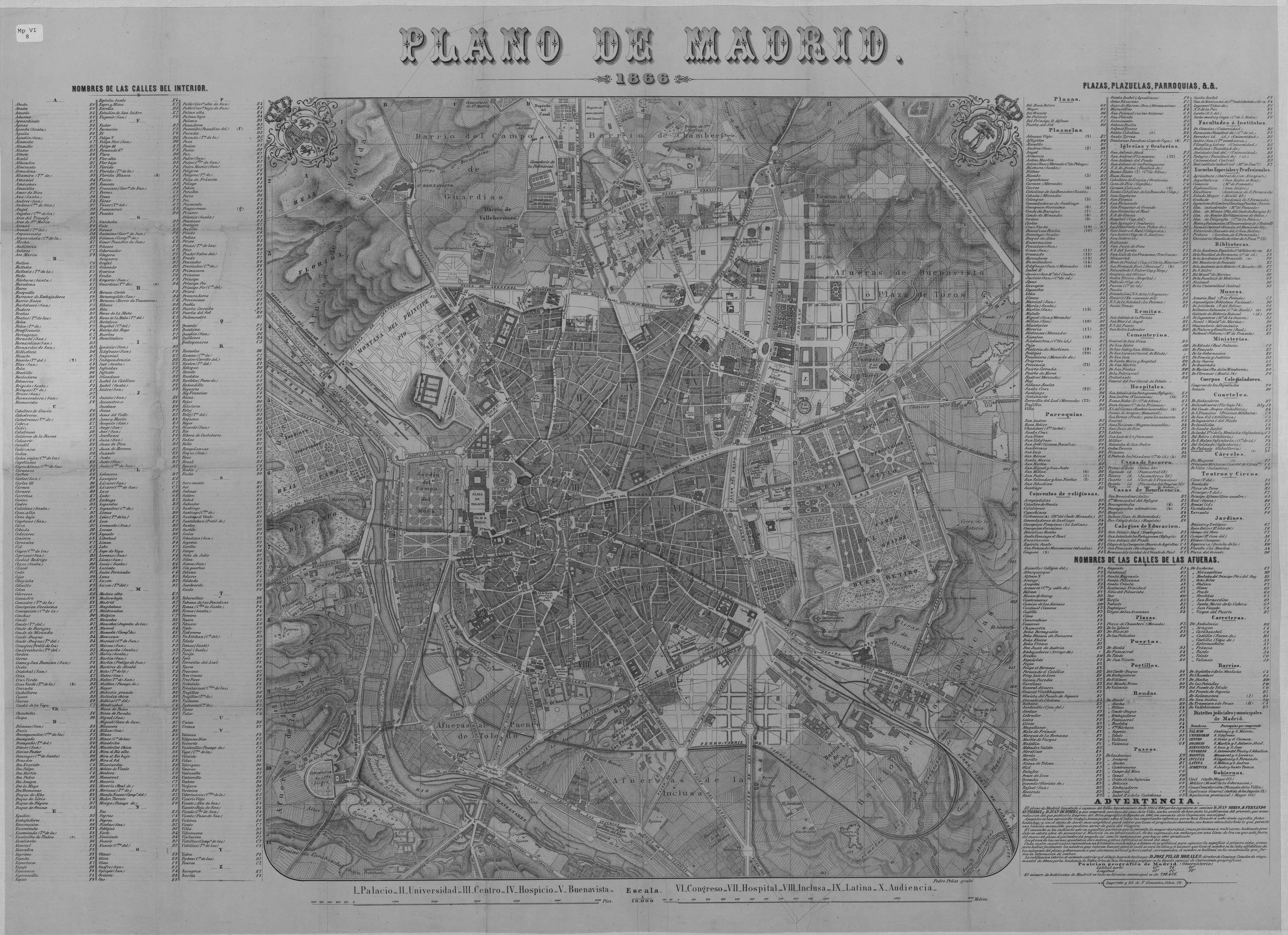
1866

1879

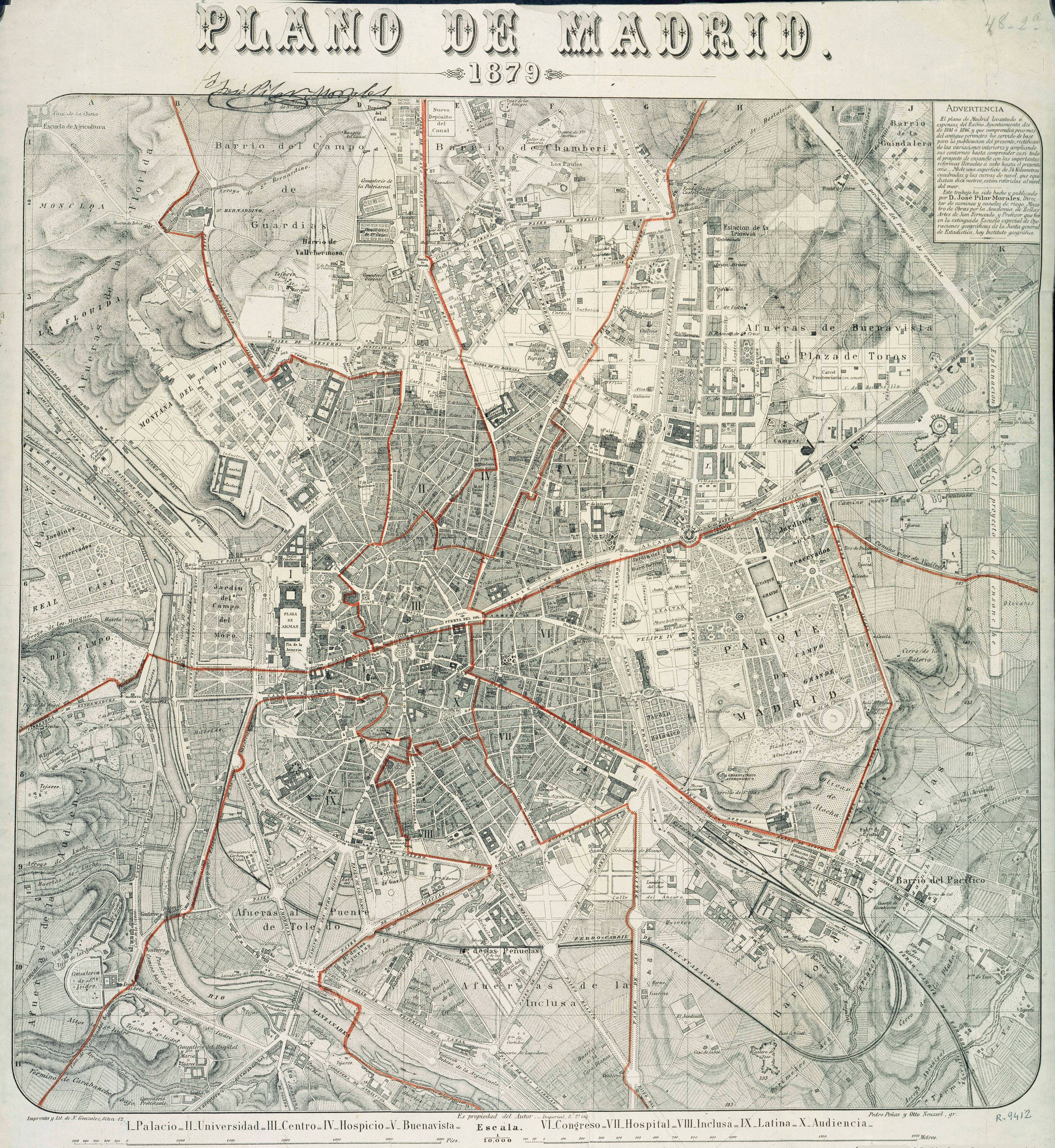
1879

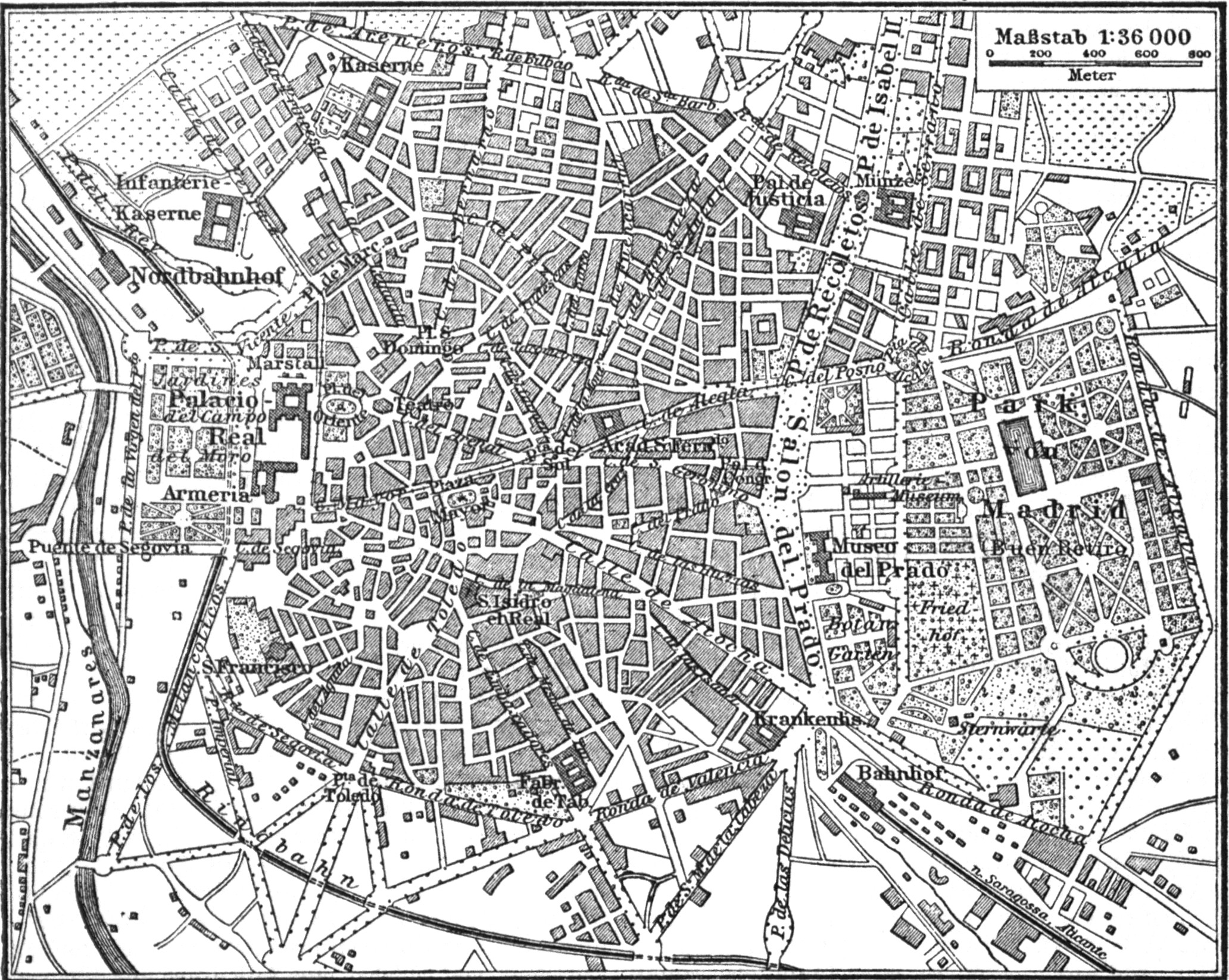
1890

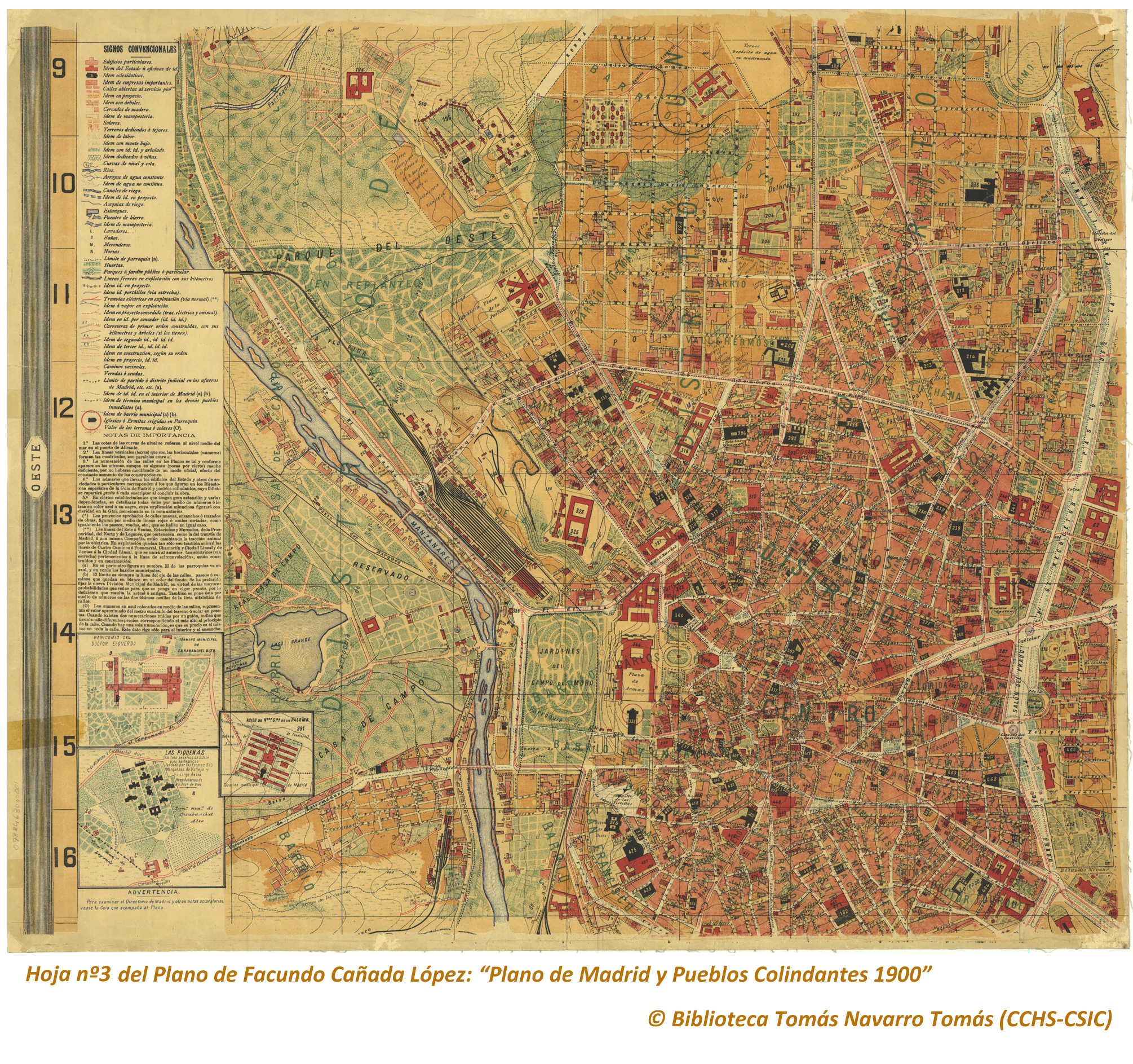
1900

=== 20th century ===
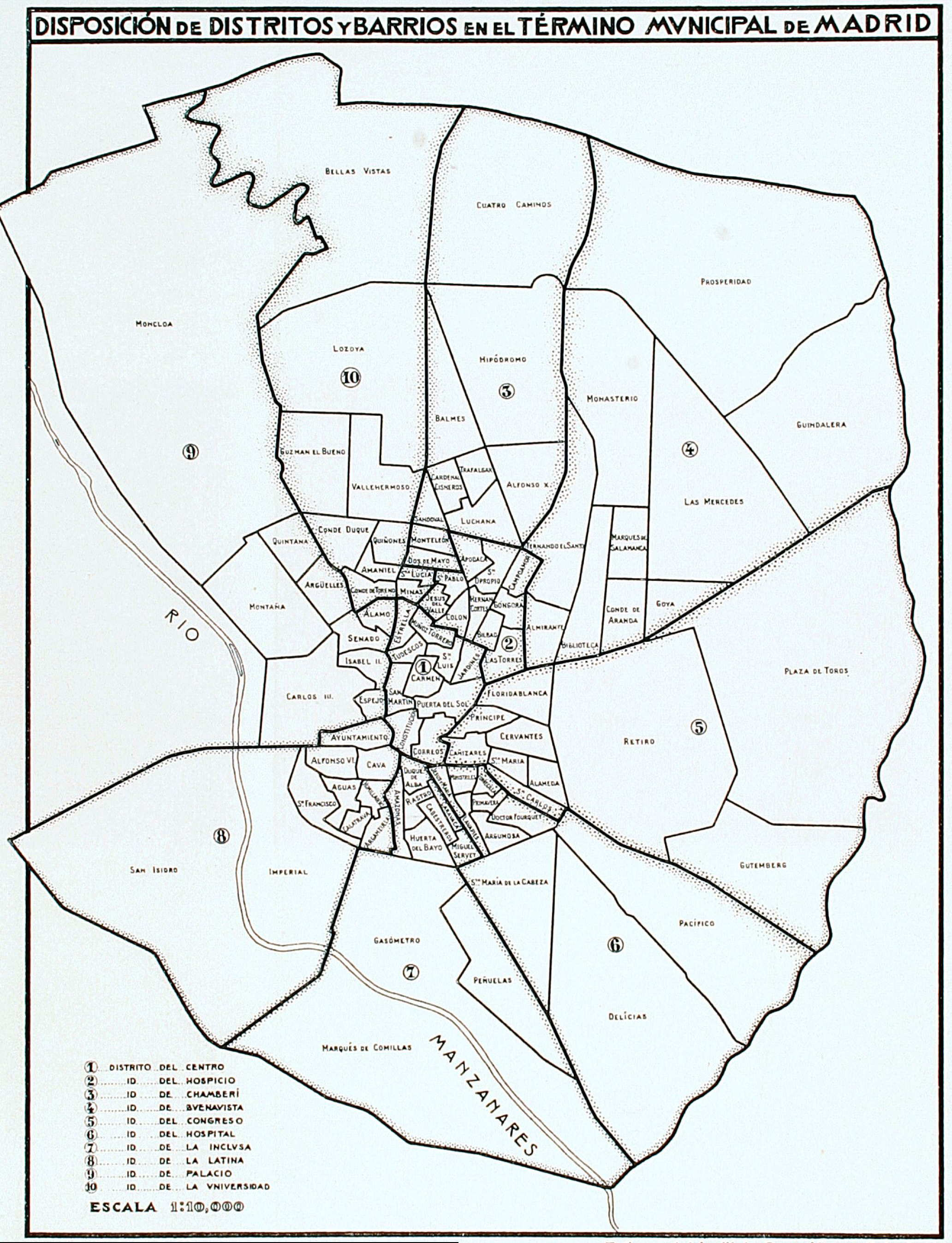
1929

1975

1982

1992

2000

=== 21st century ===
2012 (includes metropolitan area)

2015

== See also ==
- List of mayors of Madrid
- History of Madrid
- Madrid capital

== Bibliography ==
=== in English ===
Published in the 18th-19th century

- Thomas Nugent (1749), "Madrid", The Grand Tour, vol. 4, London: S. Birt, hdl:2027/mdp.39015030762580
- Jedidiah Morse; Richard C. Morse (1823), "Madrid", New Universal Gazetteer (4th ed.), New Haven, Connecticut: S. Converse
- David Brewster, ed. (1830). "Madrid". Edinburgh Encyclopædia. Edinburgh: William Blackwood.
- "Madrid", Cabinet Cyclopædia, vol. VII: Cities and Principal Towns of the World, London: Longman, Rees, Orme, Brown, & Green, 1830, OCLC 2665202
- Arthur de Capell Brooke (1831), "Madrid", Sketches in Spain and Morocco, London: Henry Colburn and Richard Bentley, OCLC 13783280
- Richard Ford (1855), "Madrid", A Handbook for Travellers in Spain (3rd ed.), London: John Murray, OCLC 2145740
- Samuel Sullivan Cox (1870), "Madrid", Search for Winter Sunbeams in the Riviera, Corsica, Algiers and Spain, New York: D. Appleton & Company, OCLC 1022285
- John Lomas, ed. (1889), "Madrid", O'Shea's Guide to Spain and Portugal (8th ed.), Edinburgh: Adam & Charles Black

Published in the 20th century

- "Madrid", Spain and Portugal: Handbook for Travellers (3rd ed.), Leipsic: Karl Baedeker, 1908, OCLC 1581249
- Albert Frederick Calvert (1909), Madrid, London: J. Lane, OCLC 1598573, OL 7014970M
- Herbermann, Charles George (1910). "Madrid-Alcala". Catholic Encyclopedia. New York.
- "Madrid (city)" . Encyclopædia Britannica. Vol. 17 (11th ed.). 1910. pp. 292–295.
- Nathaniel Newnham Davis (1911), "Madrid", Gourmet's Guide to Europe (3rd ed.), London: Grant Richards
- Francis Whiting Halsey, ed. (1914). "Madrid". Spain and Portugal. Seeing Europe with Famous Authors. Vol. 9. Funk & Wagnalls Company. hdl:2027/nyp.33433006214559 – via HathiTrust.
- Beatrice Erskine (1922), Madrid: Past and Present, London: John Lane, OL 7028442M
- Trudy Ring, ed. (1996). "Madrid". Southern Europe. International Dictionary of Historic Places. Vol. 3. Fitzroy Dearborn. OCLC 31045650.
- Michael Ugarte (1996), Madrid 1900, USA: Pennsylvania State University Press, ISBN 0271015594

Published in the 21st century

- J. Maldonado (2005). "Madrid". In Anton Kreukels; et al. (eds.). Metropolitan Governance and Spatial Planning: Comparative Case Studies of European City-Regions. Routledge. ISBN 978-1-134-49606-8.
- David Gilmour (2012). "Madrid". Cities of Spain. Random House. ISBN 978-1-4481-3833-3.

=== in other languages ===
- "Madrid". Castilla la Nueva. Recuerdos y bellezas de España (in Spanish). Vol. 1. 1853. hdl:2027/ucm.5325879622.
- Eusebio Blasco (1873), Madrid por dentro y por fuera: Guia de forasteros incautos [Madrid inside and out: stranger's guide] (in Spanish), Julian Peña, OCLC 34689580, OL 23446308M
- Madame d'Aulnoy (1874), Mme B. Carey (ed.), La cour et la ville de Madrid vers la fin du XVIIe siècle [The court and the city of Madrid in the late seventeenth century] (in French), Paris: E. Plon et cie, OL 24403114M
- Timoteo Domingo Palacio, ed. (1888), Documentos del Archivo General de la villa de Madrid [Documents from the Archives of the City of Madrid] (in Spanish), Madrid: Impr. y Lit. Municipal v.4
- "Madrid". Brockhaus' Konversations-Lexikon (in German) (14th ed.). Leipzig: Brockhaus. 1908.
