= Agustín Rodríguez Sahagún =

Spanish politician and businessman

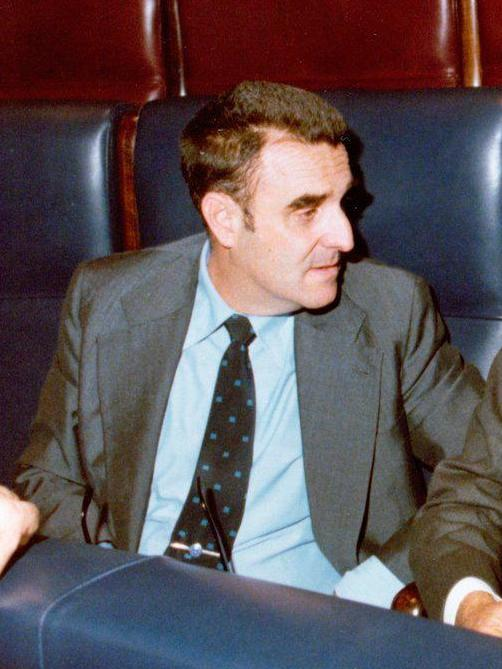
Agustín Rodríguez Sahagún (1980).

Agustín Rodríguez Sahagún (Ávila, 27 March 1932 – Paris, 13 October 1991) was a Spanish politician and businessman as well as being a doctor in economics and law who was best known as being the mayor of Madrid from 1989 to 1991.

He studied law at the University of Deusto in Bilbao, a city in which for some time he devoted to various activities in the publishing business. In 1976 he started the business Segovian Business Federation (Federación Empresarial Segoviana.) A year later, in 1977, he participated in the founding of the Spanish Confederation of Small and Medium Enterprises, of which he was elected president.

His career in politics began on 24 February 1978, when he became part of the Union of the Democratic Centre (Spain). The following year, in February 1979, took over the defence portfolio, a post he held during the 23-F coup d'état on 23 February 1981. In the March 1979 General Election he was elected MP representing Vizcaya Province.

In February 1981 he was elected chairman of the UCD, though he resigned from the party in August 1982 to accompany Adolfo Suárez in the creation of a new party, the Democratic and Social Centre (CDS). The CDS fared poorly in the 1982 General Election, losing 14 of its sitting 16 MPs. Rodríguez, together with Suárez were the only CDS MPs to hold their seats with Rodríguez representing Ávila Province. He was re-elected at the 1986 General Election.

In the municipal elections of 1987, he presented himself as a candidate for the Mayor of Madrid, though he only came in third place. In 1989, he stood against the then Mayor of Madrid, Juan Barranco Gallardo, and won with 29 votes out of 55 with the support of the People's Party (PP). On 20 June 1989 Rodríguez Sahagún was sworn in Mayor of the Spanish capital. During his tenure several tunnels were opened to traffic with the objective of reducing congestion in Madrid. He remained in office until April 1991, when he resigned due to bad health.

Rodríguez Sahagún died in Paris on 13 October 1991.

On 19 January 1995 a monument dedicated to the memory of Rodríguez Sahagún was opened, in the Madrid park that also bears his name.

== Quote ==
- En esta vida hay que ser solución, no problema. (In life you have to be solution, not the problem.)
