= Enrique Tierno Galván =

Mayor of Madrid

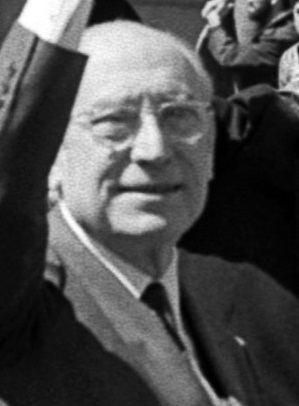

Mayor of Madrid
- In office 15 May 1979 – 19 January 1986
- Preceded by: Luis María Huete
- Succeeded by: Juan Barranco Gallardo

Member of the Congress of Deputies
- In office 15 June 1977 – 31 August 1982
- Constituency: Madrid

Personal details
- Born: Enrique Tierno Galván; 8 February 1918 Madrid, Spain
- Died: 19 January 1986 (aged 67) Madrid, Spain
- Party: PSOE
- Other political affiliations: PSP
- Profession: Lawyer

Enrique Tierno Galván (8 February 1918 – 19 January 1986) was a Spanish politician, sociologist, lawyer and essayist, best known for being the Mayor of Madrid from 1979 to 1986, at the beginning of the new period of Spanish democracy. His time as Mayor of Madrid was marked by the development of Madrid both administratively and socially, and the cultural movement known as the Movida madrileña.

== Career ==
=== Early career ===
He fought in the Spanish Civil War in the Republican faction. After the war ended, he continued his studies and got a Ph.D. in Law and another in Philosophy. He held a Chair of Professor at the University of Murcia from 1948 to 1953, and at the University of Salamanca from 1953 until 1965. Afterwards, he worked as a lawyer and occasional professor at Princeton University, Bryn Mawr College and the University of Puerto Rico in San Juan.

=== Writer ===
As a writer, he authored over 30 books, and translated important works such as the Tractatus Logico-Philosophicus of Ludwig Wittgenstein.

In 1978 he was chosen to write the preamble to the Spanish Constitution.

=== Politician ===
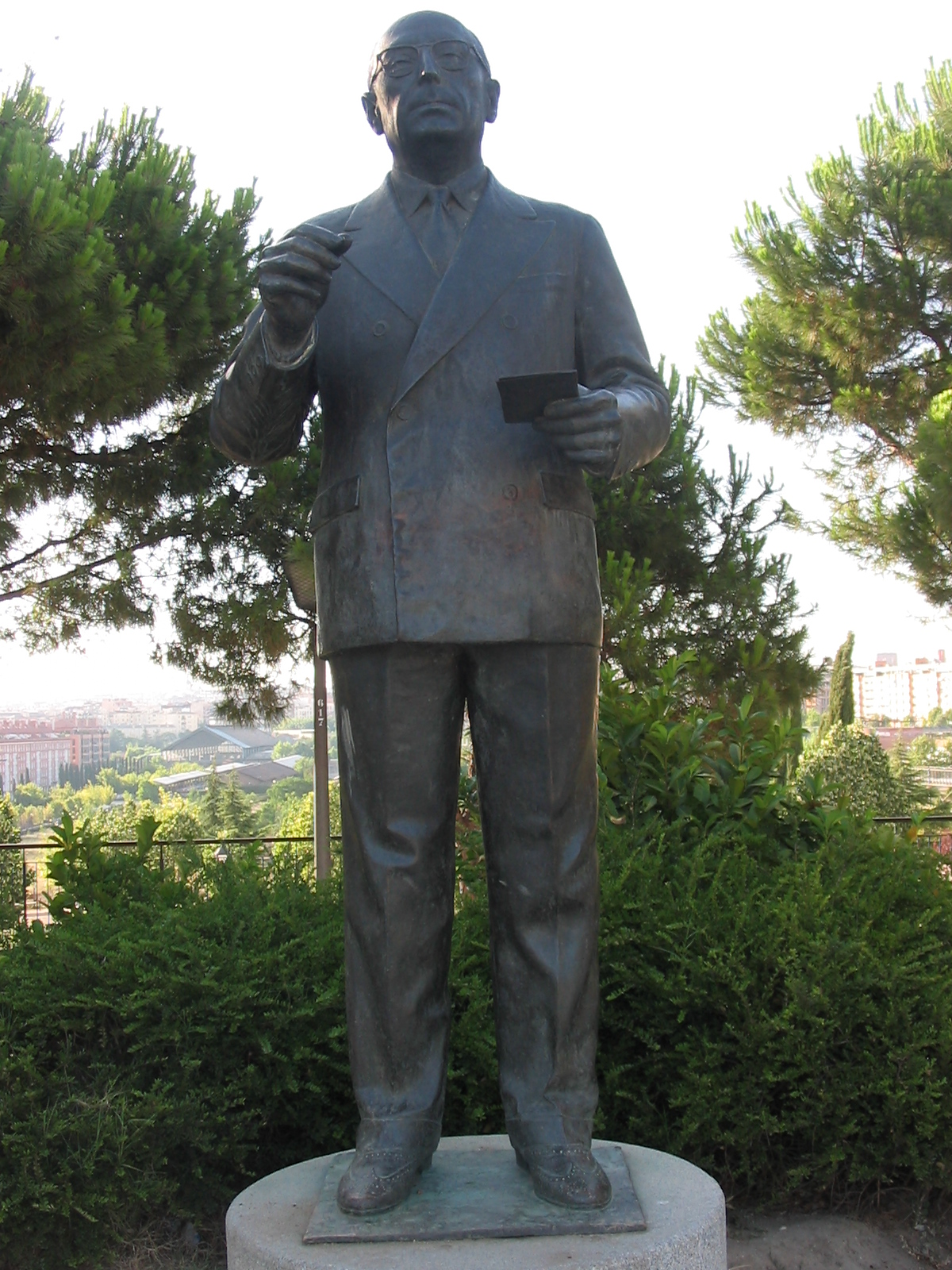
Statue of Tierno Galván in Madrid, in the park named after him

He founded the Popular Socialist Party (social democrats) in 1968 and was its president until 1978, when it merged with the larger Spanish Socialist Workers' Party. In 1979 and 1982 he was one of the members of that party elected to the Congress of Deputies.

He was elected Mayor of Madrid after the polls of 3 April 1979 as result of an agreement between the PSOE and PCE . As a candidate from the Spanish Socialist Workers' Party, he was the first leftist Mayor of Madrid after four decades of Francoist government. Reelected in 1983, he would remain in office until his death in 1986.

During his time as Mayor of Madrid, in addition to his support of the cultural changes of the Movida Madrileña, he promoted or finished many improvements to the city such as the traffic tunnels by the Atocha railway station, the development of incentives to use buses and other mass transports, the cleaning of the Manzanares river, the main market of the city (Mercamadrid) or the reorganization of the Districts of Madrid.

=== Death ===
He died in Madrid on 19 January 1986 from a cardiac arrest aged 67. He was interred at cementerio de la Almudena two days later.

Political offices
Preceded by Luis María Huete	Mayor of Madrid; 1979-1986	Succeeded by Juan Barranco Gallardo
Party political offices
Preceded by Party created	President of the Popular Socialist Party; 1968-1978	Succeeded by Party dissolved
