= Juan Barranco Gallardo =

Spanish politician (born 1947)

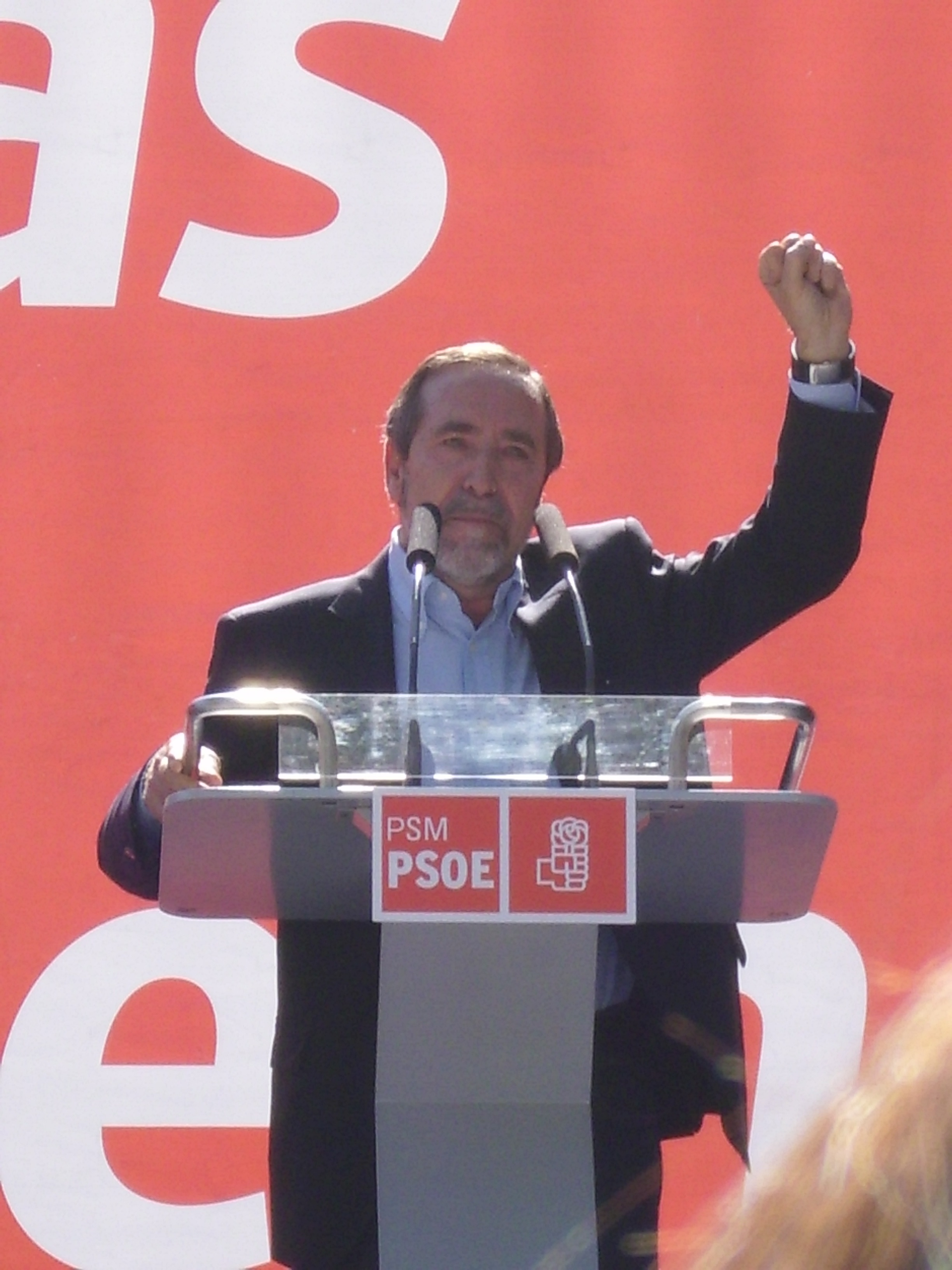
Juan Barranco Gallardo

Juan Antonio Barranco Gallardo (born 13 August 1947 in Santiago de Calatrava, Jaén Province) is a retired Spanish politician in the Spanish Socialist Workers' Party. He was Mayor of Madrid following the 1986 death of Enrique Tierno Galván, who had been Mayor since 1979.

Barranco won the following municipal elections in 1987, but lost the mayoral race in June 1989. Juan Barranco was a municipal councillor for Madrid from 1983 to 1999. He was also a Senator for Madrid from 1989 until 2008 when he returned to the congress of deputies, again representing Madrid.
