= Mayor of Madrid =

Spanish municipal office

- Alcalde de Madrid
- Coat of arms of Madrid

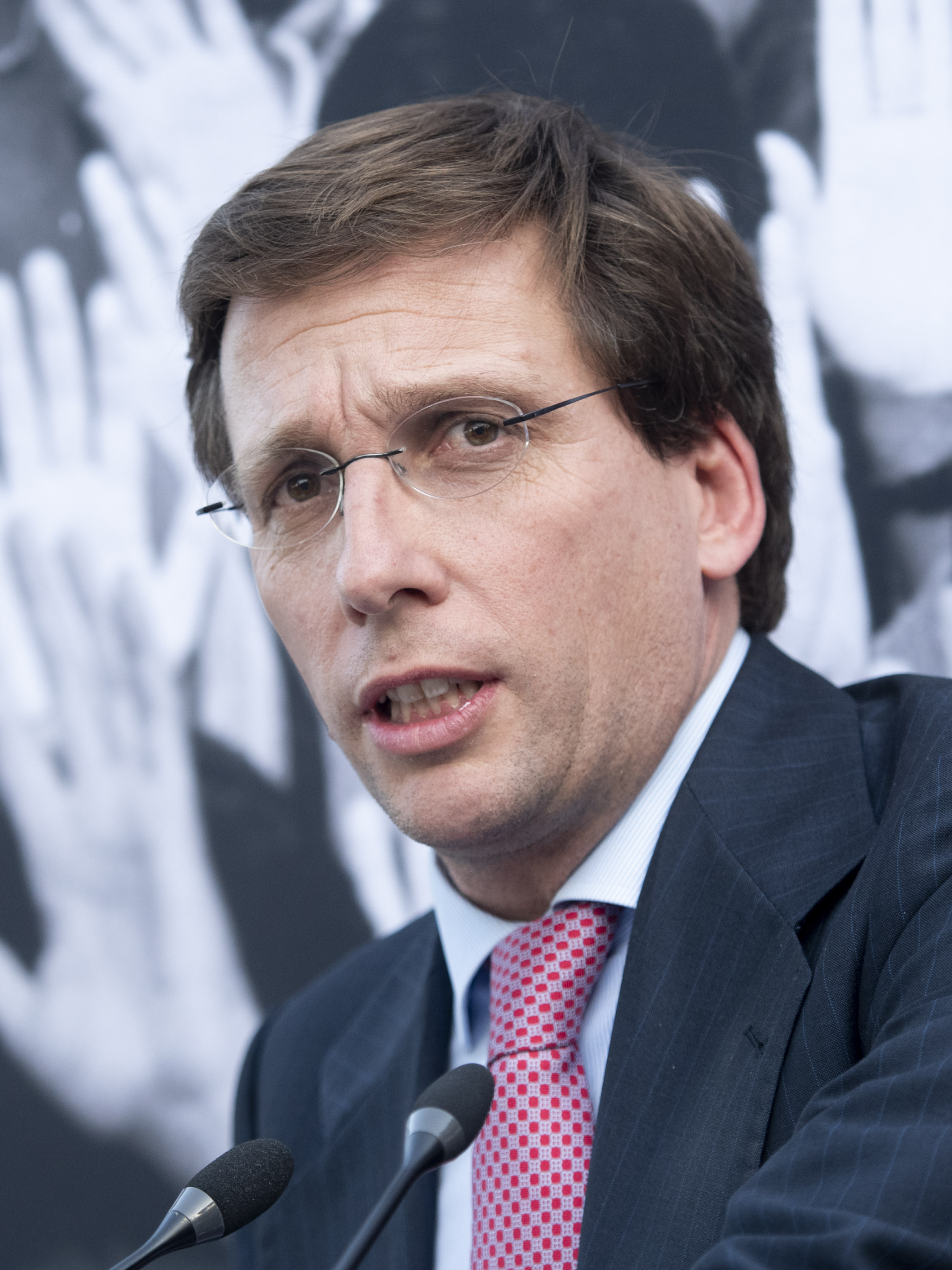
- Incumbent; José Luis Martínez-Almeida since 15 June 2019
- City Council of Madrid
- Style: The Most Excellent
- Appointer: Plenary
- Term length: Four years; no limit.
- Formation: 14th century
- Deputy: Lieutenant Mayor (Deputy Mayor)
- Salary: €106,130.52 (2019)

The Mayor of Madrid presides over the Madrid City Council, the government body of the capital city of Spain. The mayor has the duty of boosting the local policies, it directs the action of the other executive bodies, leads the Local Executive Administration and is accountable to the Plenary for its political management.

As head of government, the mayor leads the Government Board and appoints its members. The mayor is also entrusted with chairing the Plenary meetings, although this responsibility can be delegated to another councilmember.

The office of mayor has a local nature and must not be confused with the President of the Community of Madrid, the leader of the regional government.

== History ==
Initially Mayors of Madrid had the office of 'Corregidor' when first instituted in the Kingdom of Castile by Henry III in 1393 and later formalized by the Catholic Monarchs–Ferdinand II and Isabella I–in 1480. The Mayor of Madrid reported directly to the President of the Council of the Kingdom of Castile, and had jurisdiction over all parts of the district of Madrid, which included not only the town but also 36 neighbouring villages. In 1746 Ferdinand VI of Spain abolished the office, appointing a political and military governor in place, but the following year reversed this reform.

With 1833 territorial division of Spain the office of Corregidor was replaced by the office of Mayor, has continued to the present except for two periods: during the dictatorship of Primo de Rivera (1920-1930) and after the Second Spanish Republic, which suspended municipalities in Spain (1934-1936), when local governments a management committees created for this purpose. The mayor of Madrid, as well as Barcelona, is entitled to enjoy privileges of the third political rank.

== Duties and powers ==
The mayor has the responsibility to lead the local government and the local administration; represent the City Council; convene and preside over the sessions of the Plenary; manage, inspectorate and boost the local services and public works; dictate regulations; execute the local budget; head the civil service and hire, fire or sanction the personnel at its service; head the Madrid Police; lead the urban planning; exercise all judicial actions to defend the interests of the city; and adopt all necessary measures in case of catastrophe.

== Election ==
The election system of mayors is common to all the country. The citizens vote for the local assemblies or councils on the basis of universal suffrage, with all nationals over eighteen, registered in the corresponding municipality and in full enjoyment of all political rights entitled to vote. The mayor is in turn elected by the plenary assembly, with a legal clause providing for the candidate of the most-voted party to be automatically elected to the post in the event no other candidate is to gather an absolute majority of votes.

=== Cessation ===
As in the regional or State governments, the mayor can be removed by a vote of no confidence approved by the majority of the plenary. This motion necessarily needs to proposed an alternative candidate, being a constructive vote of no confidence. Unlike the previously mentioned governments, the local assemblies has the limit of one vote of no confidence per term.

The mayor itself can also propose a vote of confidence to be voted at the plenary in order to pass relevant by-laws or the budget and if the mayor fails to overcome the motion, it would automatically cease. The mayor cannot propose more than one vote of confidence per year and this kind of motions cannot be proposed on the last year of the 4-year term.

The general cases of cessation are death, incapacitation or resignation.

== Deputy Mayors ==
The mayor has the authority to appoint, among the councillors that are part of the executive branch, Deputy Mayors (Tenientes de Alcalde). The duties of the deputy mayors are to replace the mayor in cases of vacancy, absence or illness.

== See also ==
- Madrid
- Timeline of Madrid history
- History of Madrid
