= Fernando Suárez González =

Spanish politician (1933–2024)

Member of the European Parliament for Spain
- In office 1 January 1986 – 18 July 1994

Third Deputy Prime Minister of Spain
- In office 5 March 1975 – 12 December 1975
- Preceded by: Licinio de la Fuente
- Succeeded by: Juan-Miguel Villar Mir

Minister of Labour
- In office 4 March 1975 – 11 December 1975
- Preceded by: Licinio de la Fuente
- Succeeded by: José Solís Ruiz

Member of the Congress of Deputies
- In office 8 November 1982 – 15 July 1986
- Constituency: Madrid

Personal details
- Born: 10 August 1933; León, Spain
- Died: 29 April 2024 (aged 90); Madrid, Spain
- Political party: FET y de las JONS; People's Alliance; People's Party
- Profession: Politician, jurist

Fernando Suárez González (10 August 1933 – 29 April 2024) was a Spanish politician and jurist. From 2021 until his death in 2024, he was the last living minister who served in Francisco Franco's regime.

He was the rapporteur of the Political Reform Act in 1976 that allowed the elimination of the governmental structures of the Franco regime and initiated the democratic transition.

== Biography ==
Suárez was born on 10 August 1933. He graduated in law from the University of Oviedo, then completed his PhD at the University of Bologna. He worked as, among other things, an academic teacher at the Complutense University of Madrid, where he became professor of labour law. In 1969, he returned to Oviedo as chairman, and two years later as dean. He was also active in the state administration during the Francoist period. In 1973 he became the general director of the Instituto Español de Emigración, an institution dealing with migration policy. In 1975, in the last government headed by General Francisco Franco, Suárez served as Minister of Labour and Third Deputy Prime Minister.

After the political changes, Suárez was active in the People's Alliance and then the People's Party. In the years 1982–1986, he was a member of the Congress of Deputies of the second term. After the accession of Spain to the European Economic Community in 1986, he assumed the mandate of a member of the European Parliament for the second term. He kept it in the 1987 and 1989 general elections. He served as vice-chairman of the Budget Committee, vice-chairman of the Group for European Democracy and a member of the presidium of the European People's Party.

Suárez continued his academic activity at UNED. In 2007, he received a membership in the Real Academia de Ciencias Morales y Políticas.

In 2014, the Argentine judge María Romilda Servini issued an arrest and extradition order against several former ministers of the Franco dictatorship. Suárez was included in the order for his responsibility for the death penalty of the last five executions by the Franco dictatorship in 1975. The request for extradition was refused by the Spanish National Court on the basis that the statute of limitations had run out on the accusation against him.

Suárez died in Madrid on 29 April 2024, at the age of 90.
