= Carlos Cuerpo =

Spanish politician (born 1980)

The Most Excellent Carlos Cuerpo
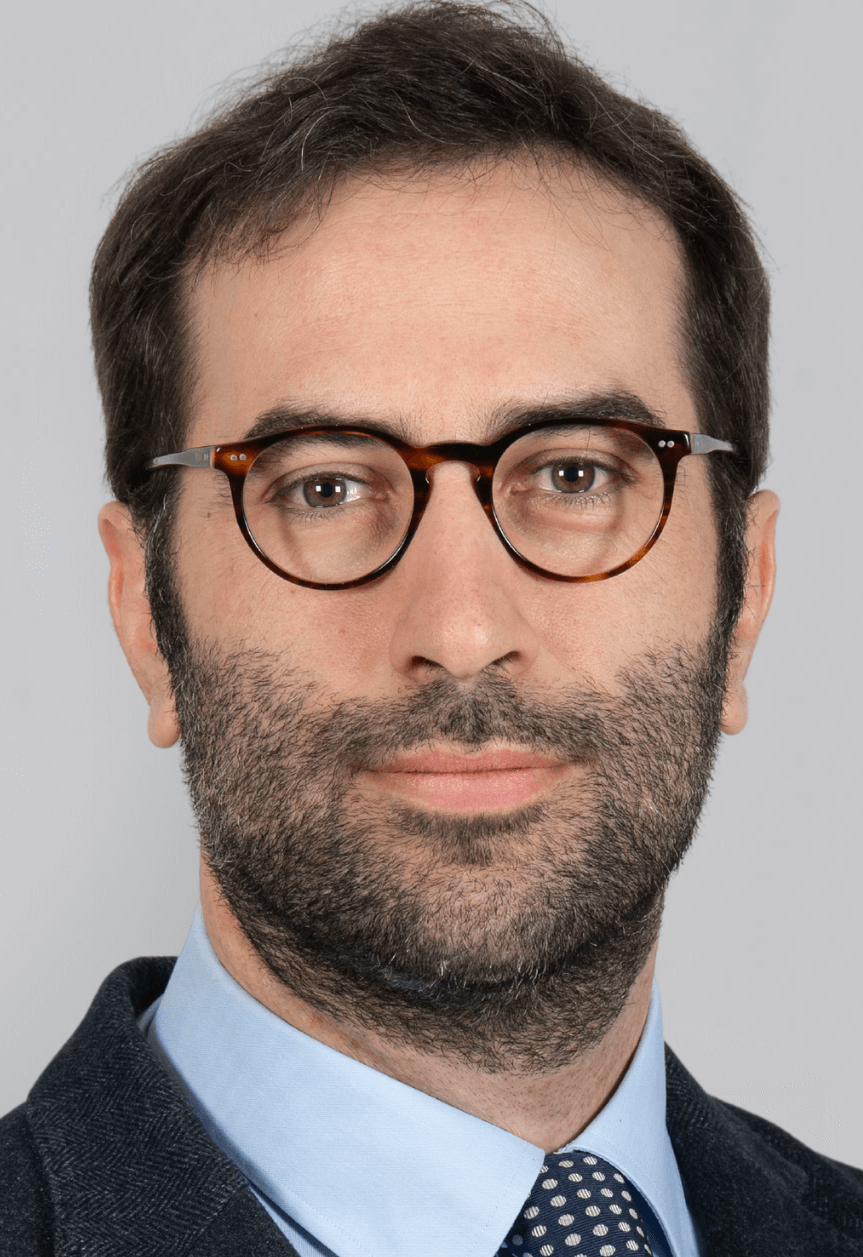
- Official portrait, 2024

First Deputy Prime Minister of Spain
- Incumbent
- Assumed office 27 March 2026 Serving with Yolanda Díaz and Sara Aagesen
- Monarch: Felipe VI
- Prime Minister: Pedro Sánchez
- Preceded by: María Jesús Montero

Minister of Economy, Trade and Enterprise
- Incumbent
- Assumed office 29 December 2023
- Monarch: Felipe VI
- Prime Minister: Pedro Sánchez
- Preceded by: Nadia Calviño

Minister of Transport and Sustainable Mobility
- Acting
- Assumed office 4 November 2026
- Monarch: Felipe VI
- Prime Minister: Pedro Sánchez
- Preceded by: Óscar Puente

Secretary-General for the Treasury and International Financing of Spain
- In office 25 August 2021 – 29 December 2023
- Prime Minister: Pedro Sánchez
- Preceded by: Pilar Mas Rodríguez
- Succeeded by: Paula Conthe Calvo

Director-General for Macroeconomic Analysis of Spain
- In office 4 February 2020 – 25 August 2021
- Prime Minister: Pedro Sánchez
- Preceded by: Carlos San Basilio
- Succeeded by: Víctor Ausín Rodríguez

Personal details
- Born: Carlos Cuerpo Caballero; 26 September 1980 (age 46) Badajoz, Spain
- Party: Independent
- Children: 1
- Education: Universidad de Extremadura; London School of Economics; Universidad Autonoma de Madrid

Carlos Cuerpo Caballero (born 26 September 1980) is a Spanish economist and politician who has been serving as minister of Economy, Trade and Enterprise in the government of Pedro Sánchez since 2023, succeeding Nadia Calviño after she was elected as president of the European Investment Bank; and as acting Minister of Transport since November 2026 following the resignation of Óscar Puente. Since 2008, he is a high-ranking civil servant in the High Corps of Spanish State Economists and Trade Experts.

In June 2025, Cuerpo put forward his candidacy to become the president of the Eurogroup, competing with fellow candidates Paschal Donohoe and Rimantas Šadžius; shortly after, he withdrew his name from consideration, citing insufficient support.

On 26 March 2026, Sánchez nominated him as first deputy prime minister, succeeding María Jesús Montero. He became Spain's first male deputy prime minister in fifteen years.

== Biography ==
Cuerpo was born in Badajoz in 1980, the son of two secondary education teachers. He spent part of his early life between Valle de la Serena and Switzerland, where his parents moved to work when he was nine years old. He graduated in economics at the University of Extremadura in 2003, specializing in macroeconomics. He would later obtain a MSc in economics at the London School of Economics, specializing in monetary economics. He holds a PhD in economics from the Autonomous University of Madrid, graduating in 2017.

Cuerpo worked as a professor at institutions such as the University of Extremadura, the Spanish Institute for Foreign Trade, the London School of Economics and George Washington University.

He joined the High Corps of Spanish State Economists and Trade Experts of Spain through a competitive examination process in 2008, and he started working for the Ministry of Economy and Finance that same year as an economic analyst in the General Directorate of Macroeconomics Analysis between May 2008 and April 2011.

He would later move to Brussels to work as an adviser for the Directorate-General for Economic and Financial Affairs of the European Commission.

Back to Spain, He served as Deputy Director General for Public Debt at AIReF (the Independent Authority for Fiscal Responsibility of Spain) from May 2014 to October 2016. In November 2016, he was appointed Director of the Economic Analysis Division at AIReF, a position he held until February 2020, when he was appointed Director General for Macroeconomic Analysis.

During the COVID-19 pandemic, he was part of the "council of experts" that advised the government on the design of the de-escalation process and assisted the Department of Economics in the development of new tools to monitor economic activity during this period.

== Other activities ==
=== European Union organizations ===
- European Investment Bank (EIB), Ex-Officio Member of the Board of Governors (since 2024)
- European Stability Mechanism (ESM), Member of the Board of Governors (since 2024)

=== International organizations ===
- Asian Infrastructure Investment Bank (AIIB), Ex-Officio Member of the Board of Governors (since 2024)
- Central American Bank for Economic Integration (CABEI), Ex-Officio Member of the Board of Governors (since 2024)
- European Bank for Reconstruction and Development (EBRD), Ex-Officio Member of the Board of Governors (since 2024)
- Inter-American Investment Corporation (IIC), Ex-Officio Member of the Board of Governors (since 2024)
- International Monetary Fund (IMF), Ex-Officio Member of the Board of Governors (since 2024)
- Multilateral Investment Guarantee Agency (MIGA), World Bank Group, Ex-Officio Member of the Board of Governors (since 2024)
- World Bank, Ex-Officio Member of the Board of Governors (since 2024)

== Personal life ==
Apart from his native Spanish, he speaks English and French, as well as having some knowledge of Japanese. He is married and has one daughter.

Political offices
Preceded by Nadia Calviño	Minister of Economy, Trade and Enterprise of Spain; 2023–present	Incumbent
