= High Corps of Spanish State Economists and Trade Experts =

Ministry of Economy and Competitiveness

Department overview
- Jurisdiction: Kingdom of Spain
- Minister responsible: Nadia Calviño, Minister for Economic Affairs

The Spanish State Economists and Trade Experts (Spanish: Técnicos Comerciales y Economistas del Estado, TCEE) is the body of officials which belongs to the Central Administration specialized in the development and implementation of economic and trade policies of the Spanish government.

The extensive knowledge and training of its members qualify them in a convenient way for any field in the local, regional, central and foreign administrations where knowledge of economic, financial, commercial and regulatory aspects is required. In addition, their knowledge qualifies them for important roles in specialized and regulatory agencies (domestic or international ones) in their fields of expertise, as well as in multilateral organizations. Its economic and commercial training is guaranteed by the demanding entry exams, promoted by the Spanish State, which is recognized both nationally and internationally.

This special body was created in 1984 by the integration of both the Special Body of Facultative State Trade Experts and that of the State Economists, although its origin is the Law Decree 681/1930, of 28 February, which creates the Technical Body of Commercial Secretaries and Officials.

== History ==
=== Two separated corps ===
It was created in 1984 by the integration of both the Special Body of Facultative State Trade Experts and that of the State Economists. The first one was created in 1933 by the Decree/Law 681 of 1930, with the name of the Technical Body of Commercial Secretaries and Officials. By doing so, the Government emphasized the importance acquired by international trade in the years following the Great Depression and the need to devote attention and expertise to the defense of Spanish commercial interests.

In 1940, maintaining the same functions, the body changed its name to Trade Experts of the State and in 1950, with the creation of the Ministry of Commerce, it was consolidated as a reference in the definition of economic and trade policy in Spain. The milestone in this respect was the Stabilization Plan of 1959, which allowed the incorporation of Spain into the institutions created by the Bretton Woods agreements: the International Monetary Fund, the World Bank and the GATT (General Agreement on Tariffs and Trade).

Meanwhile, the Body of Economists of the State was created by Act of May 12, 1956. It was ascribed directly to Prime Minister and was assigned, among other functions, with the duties of performing economic studies and advising centers and ministerial departments whose projects did affect Spanish economy. Its first and major achievement was the implementation and management of the Development Plans, which marked the Spanish economic development throughout the sixties and the first half of the seventies.

In the late 70s, the role of both bodies was paramount in the design and subsequent implementation of the economic side of the so-called Moncloa Pacts. In the first half of the 80s, the main task of the State Economists was to prepare and negotiate, in close collaboration with the Ministries of Foreign Affairs, Agriculture and Industry, the economic conditions for Spain‘s access to the European Economic Community.

=== A unified single corp ===
Since 1984, with the Law 30/1984 on Measures to Reform of Public Administration, the current State Economists and Trade Experts body merges the two bodies, and assumes the primary responsibility for economic and trade policy, being one of its first key features the Spanish contribution to the definition of the European Monetary Union and the preparation of Spain for its membership.

The history of the TCEEs is linked in time to the expansion and practical application of the Economic Science. The TCEE body has starred various milestones in the Spanish economic history, such as the inclusion of the peseta in the European Monetary System, the development of the ECU and the subsequent negotiations of the European Monetary Union and the Euro. They also collaborated in the creation of the Development Assistance Fund (currently the Company Internationalization Fund), the Spanish participation in all liberalizing rounds of GATT and the World Trade Organization (WTO) and the creation of the complete network of support for the internationalization of the Spanish companies, which gets its form through the Spanish Institute for Foreign Trade (ICEX), the Spanish Company for Development Finance (COFIDES) and the Spanish Company of Credit Insurance to Exports (CESCE). Together with the latter, the TCEEs have been a major player in the consolidation and institutionalization of the Competition and Regulatory policies, which include, on the one hand, reforms and liberalizations in the markets of products, services and factors (including the important energy sector) and, on the other hand, the establishment of the National Competition Commission (now the National Commission for Markets and Competition).

== Functions and Destinations ==
A feature of the TCEEs is the versatility in both the functions and destinations they face. In the Spanish Administration, the TCEEs perform their work mainly in the Ministry of Economy and Competitiveness, and also in the Ministry of Finance and Public Administration and in the Ministry of Industry, Energy and Tourism.

Within the Ministry of Economy and Competitiveness, the TCEE are present in the Secretariat of State for Economy and Business Support, and within it, in the Secretariat General for the Treasury and Financial Policy, in the Directorate General for Economic Policy and in the Directorate General for Macroeconomic Analysis and International Economy. The TCEE also can be found throughout the organizational structure of the Secretariat of State for Trade, which includes the network of Economic and Commercial Offices abroad, the commercial services of the Spanish representation vis a vis the international organizations (Permanent Representation of Spain vis a vis the European Union, the OECD and the UN), the Spanish Chambers of Commerce abroad, and several state agencies such as the ICEX and the local offices spread across the Spanish regions. TCEE can also be found in independent bodies, such as the National Commission for Markets and Competition or the Independent Authority for Fiscal Responsibility. TCEE members are also present in other departments of the Central Government with marked economic aspects.

In the European administration, the TCEEs play roles related to economic and trade policies in both the European Commission and the European Parliament. In international organizations, they also carry out their work in International Financial Institutions such as the International Monetary Fund, the World Bank Group and Regional Development Banks.

== Prominent members ==
The number of TCEE that have acquired notoriety and gained public recognition thanks to the importance of their contribution to the process of design and management of the Spanish economic policy, either in academia or in private enterprises, is very high. Without being exhaustive, some of them are the following:

Spanish government:

Vicepresidents: Enrique Fuentes Quintana, Juan Antonio García Diez y Pedro Solbes

Ministers of Economy: Luis de Guindos, Pedro Solbes o Enrique Fuentes Quintana

Minister of Industry, Tourism and Energy: Jose Manuel Soria

Minister of Public Administration: Jordi Sevilla

Minister of Labour: Álvaro Rengifo Calderón

Minister of Economic Trade and Tourism: Juan Antonio García Diez

Minister of Commerce: Agustín Cotorruelo

Minister of Industry and Energy: Carlos Bustelo

Minister of Trade and Tourism and Minister of Transport: Luis Gámir

Minister of the Presidency: Matías Rodríguez Inciarte

Head of the Economic Office of the President: Álvaro Nadal

Secretaries of State for Trade: Agustín Hidalgo de Quintana, Luis de Velasco, Apolonio Ruiz Ligero, Miguel Ángel Feito, Pedro Mejía Gómez, Silvia Iranzo Gutiérrez, Alfredo Bonet Baiget y Jaime García Legaz

Secretaries of State for Economy: Pedro Perez Fernandez, José Ramón Álvarez Rendueles, Guillermo de la Dehesa, Miguel Ángel Fernández Ordoñez, Manuel Conthe, Luis de Guindos, Fernando Jiménez Latorre e Iñigo Fernandez de Mesa

Secretaries of State for Energy: Nemesio Fernández Cuesta y Alberto Nadal

Secretary of State for Relations with the European Community: Pedro Solbes

Secretary of State for Foreign Affairs: Miquel Nadal Segalá

Secretary of State for the European Union: Fernando Eguidazu Palacios

Bank of Spain

Governors of the Bank of Spain: José Ramón Álvarez Rendueles, Luis Ángel Rojo Duque, Jaime Caruana Lacorte, Miguel Ángel Fernández Ordoñez y Luis María Linde

International organizations

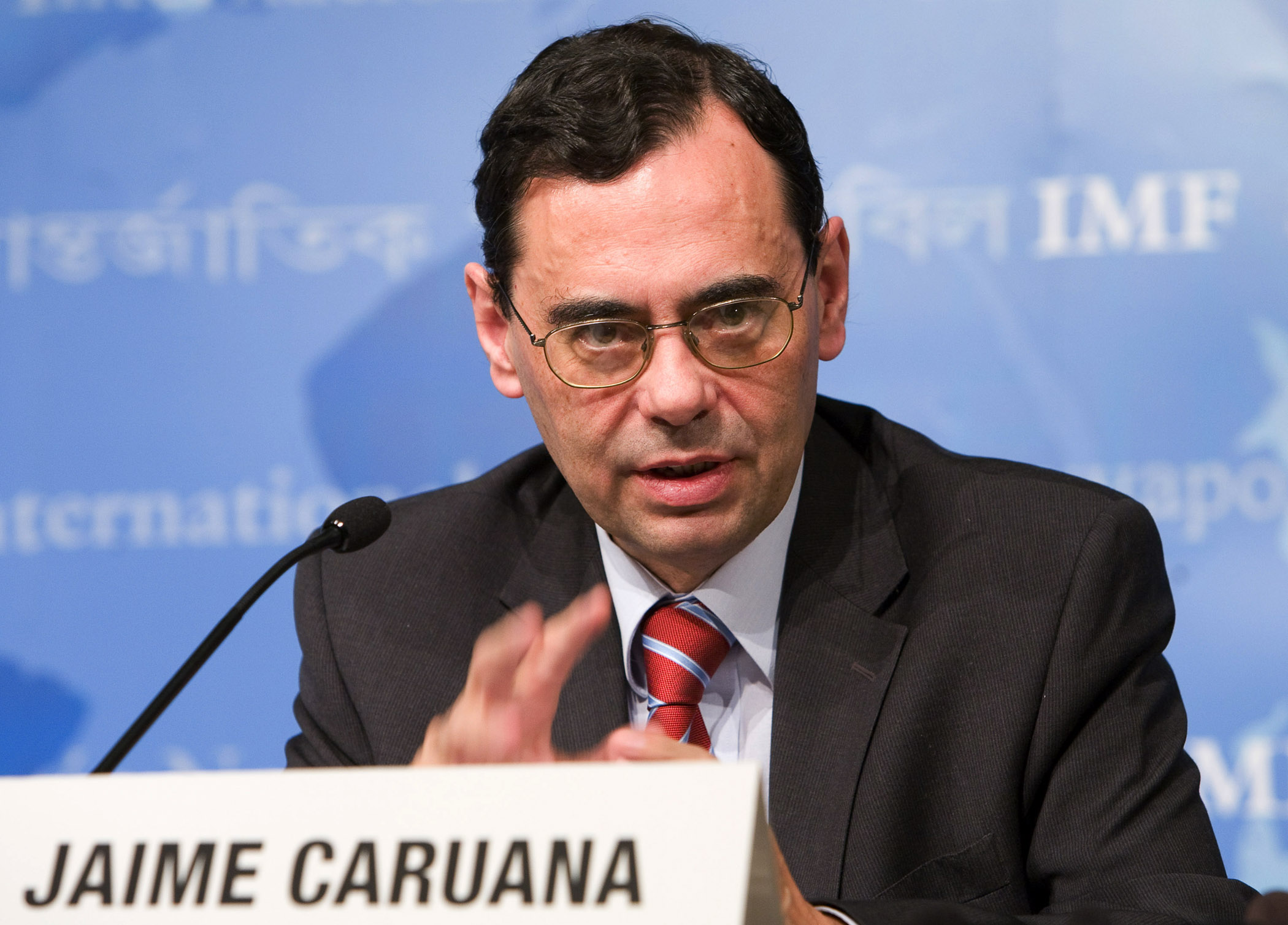
Jaime Caruana, General Manager of the Bank for International Settlements

Jaime Caruana as General Manager of the Bank for International Settlements (BIS), as Head of Monetary and Capital Markets in the IMF and a current member of the Group of 30

Manuel Conthe as Vice President for Financial Sector in the World Bank

Antonio Carrascosa as member of the Adjudication Board in the Single Settlement Mechanism of the European Union

Guillermo de la Dehesa as Chairman of the Centre for Economic Policy Research (CEPR) and Senior Member of the Group of 30

Several Executive Directors at the Executive Board of the IMF such as Ramón Guzman Zapater and Fernando Jiménez Latorre

Other members of the body have stood out for their contributions to the academic world as professors. This applies, among others, to Enrique Fuentes Quintana, Luis Angel Rojo, Manuel Varela Parache, Luis Gámir, Ramon Tamames, Jaime Requeijo, Angel Viñas, Paulina Beato and Jose Miguel Andreu.

Finally, there are also a large number of members of the body who have held and currently hold leadership positions in public and private companies as well as banks and financial institutions.
