= Licinio de la Fuente =

Spanish politician (1923–2015)

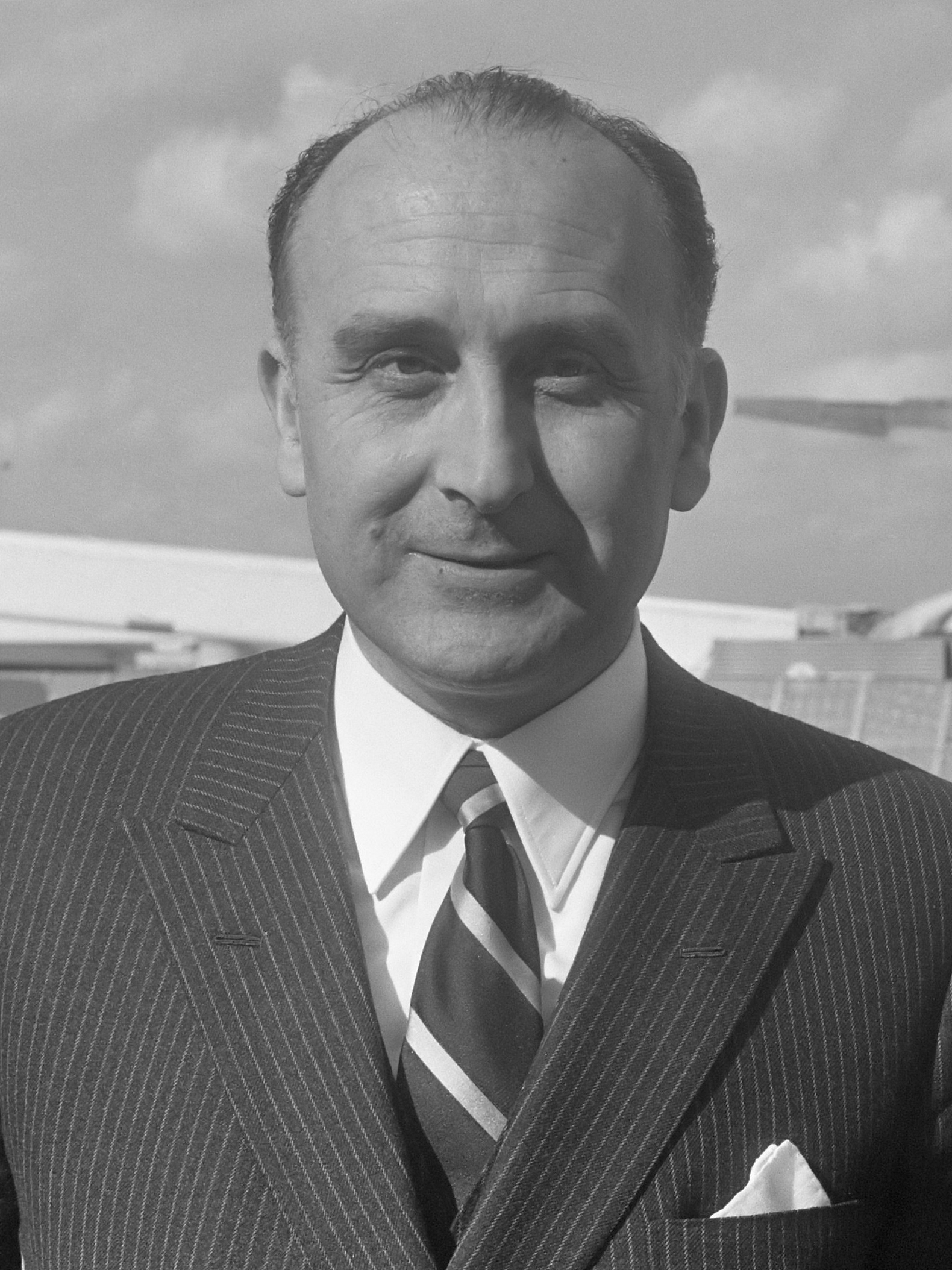
- In 1970

Third Deputy Prime Minister of Spain
- In office 4 January 1974 – 5 March 1975
- Prime Minister: Carlos Arias Navarro
- Preceded by: Office established
- Succeeded by: Fernando Suárez González

Minister of Labour of Spain
- In office 30 October 1969 – 5 March 1975
- Prime Minister: Francisco Franco; Luis Carrero Blanco; Carlos Arias Navarro
- Preceded by: Jesús Romeo Gorría
- Succeeded by: Fernando Suárez González

Personal details
- Born: Licinio de la Fuente y de la Fuente; 7 August 1923 Noez, Spain
- Died: 26 February 2015 (aged 91) Madrid, Spain
- Party: FET y de las JONS; Democracia Social (c. 1976–1977); People's Alliance (1976–1977)
- Occupation: Politician, State lawyer

Licinio de la Fuente y de la Fuente (7 August 1923 – 26 February 2015) was a Spanish Francoist politician who served as Minister of Labour from 1969 to 1975. Promoter of the Democracia Social party during the Spanish Transition, he was one of the "Magnificent Seven", the seven political leaders who founded the federation of People's Alliance (AP) in 1976.

== Biography ==
Licinio de la Fuente was born on 7 August 1923 in Noez, a small village of the province of Toledo, as the son to a staunchly Conservative family of farmers. In the midst of the Spanish Civil War, the family fled to the Francoist zone.

He earned a licentiate degree in Law from the University of Madrid, later becoming a member of the State Lawyers Corps. He served as State Lawyer in Ciudad Real (1950–1954) and Segovia (1954–1956) before his appointment, as Civil Governor of the province of Cáceres, where he remained for four years. National Delegate of the Instituto Nacional de Previsión from 1960 to 1963, he briefly resumed his activities as State Lawyer, this time at the Supreme Court, between 1963 and 1965.

Following a spell as responsible for the National Service for Cereals and as National Delegate of Wheat, he was appointed as Minister of Labour in October 1969. He remained in the post throughout the successive appointments of Carrero Blanco and Carlos Arias Navarro as heads of government. He handed in his resignation as Minister of Labor in February 1975 after the refusal of the Government of Arias to pass a new decree for collective conflicts that intended to recognise the right of strike.

During the Spanish Transition, he promoted Democracia Social (DS), a proto-party that espoused an "evolutionary neofalangist" brand of Francoism. In 1976, he joined other politicians united around the idea of limited political reform to create the coalition of People's Alliance (AP). It was together with the Spanish People's Union (UDPE) the component party that provided AP with some demands of "social justice" linked to the joseantonian falangist tradition. De la Fuente stood as AP candidate to the Congress of Deputies in the electoral list in Toledo vis-à-vis the June 1977 general election. He was elected as legislator but, weeks after, in August 1977, he announced his exit from the parliamentary group and his posts at AP, amid disagreements with the collegiate direction. Following the end of the legislative term in 1979, de la Fuente left politics and switched to the business sector.

He was member of the Boards of Directors of Dragados y Construcciones, Banco Central Hispano Hipotecario, Banco Gallego, Banco de Granada, Banco Internacional del Comercio, Española del Zinc and Ibermutua.

He was awarded with the Knight of Honour title bestowed by the Francisco Franco National Foundation (FNFF) on 18 July 2012.

He died on 26 February 2015 in Madrid.

== Works ==
- — (1998). Valió la pena. Memorias de Licinio de la Fuente. Madrid: EDAF.
