= Fernando Abril Martorell =

Spanish politician

Second Deputy Prime Minister of Spain Minister of Economy
- In office February 28, 1978 – September 9, 1980
- Preceded by: Enrique Fuentes Quintana
- Succeeded by: Leopoldo Calvo-Sotelo y Bustelo

Third Deputy Prime Minister of Spain
- In office July 5, 1977 – February 28, 1978
- Preceded by: Juan-Miguel Villar Mir (1976)
- Succeeded by: Manuel Chaves (2009)

Minister of Agriculture, Food and Environment
- In office 5 July 1976 – 6 July 1977
- Preceded by: Virgilio Oñate Gil
- Succeeded by: José Enrique Martínez Genique

Personal details
- Born: 31 August 1936; Valencia, Spain
- Died: 16 February 1998 (aged 61); Madrid, Spain
- Political party: UCD
- Profession: Politician, agronomist

Fernando Abril Martorell (31 August 1936 – 16 February 1998) was a Spanish politician and agricultural engineer.

== Biography ==
Born in Valencia, Spain, in 1936, he studied Agricultural Engineering and Political Sciences in Madrid, later obtaining a doctorate in both. In 1969 he was named a president of the Diputación Provincial de Segovia (Provincial Delegation of Segovia) and was appointed a civil governor by Adolfo Suárez. After this, he was a technical director of the FORPPA (1971-1972) and a director of general Agrarian Production (1972-1974). He was appointed a Minister of Agriculture in Spain from (1976-1977), a member of the Senate (1977-1979), and he was one of the founders of Unión de Centro Democrático (Union Democratic Center) (UCD). He was elected regional president of it in Valencia Province. He was the third Vice-president of the government for Political Subjects (1977-1978) and the second vice president Minister of Economy (1978-1980). He was one of the writers of the 1978 Constitution.

Fernando Abril was also president of the Naval Union of the East (controlled by the Central bank) and vice-president of the Hispanic Central bank (1991).

In June 1990, following a proposal by Felipe González, of the Commission of Analysis and Evaluation of the National System of Health created by the Ministry of Health, he was involved in initial discussions of reforms in the Spanish sanitary system, particularly in Madrid.

He died in Madrid, on 16 February 1998, of lung cancer.
