= Teresa Ribera =

Spanish politician (born 1969)

The Most Excellent Teresa Ribera
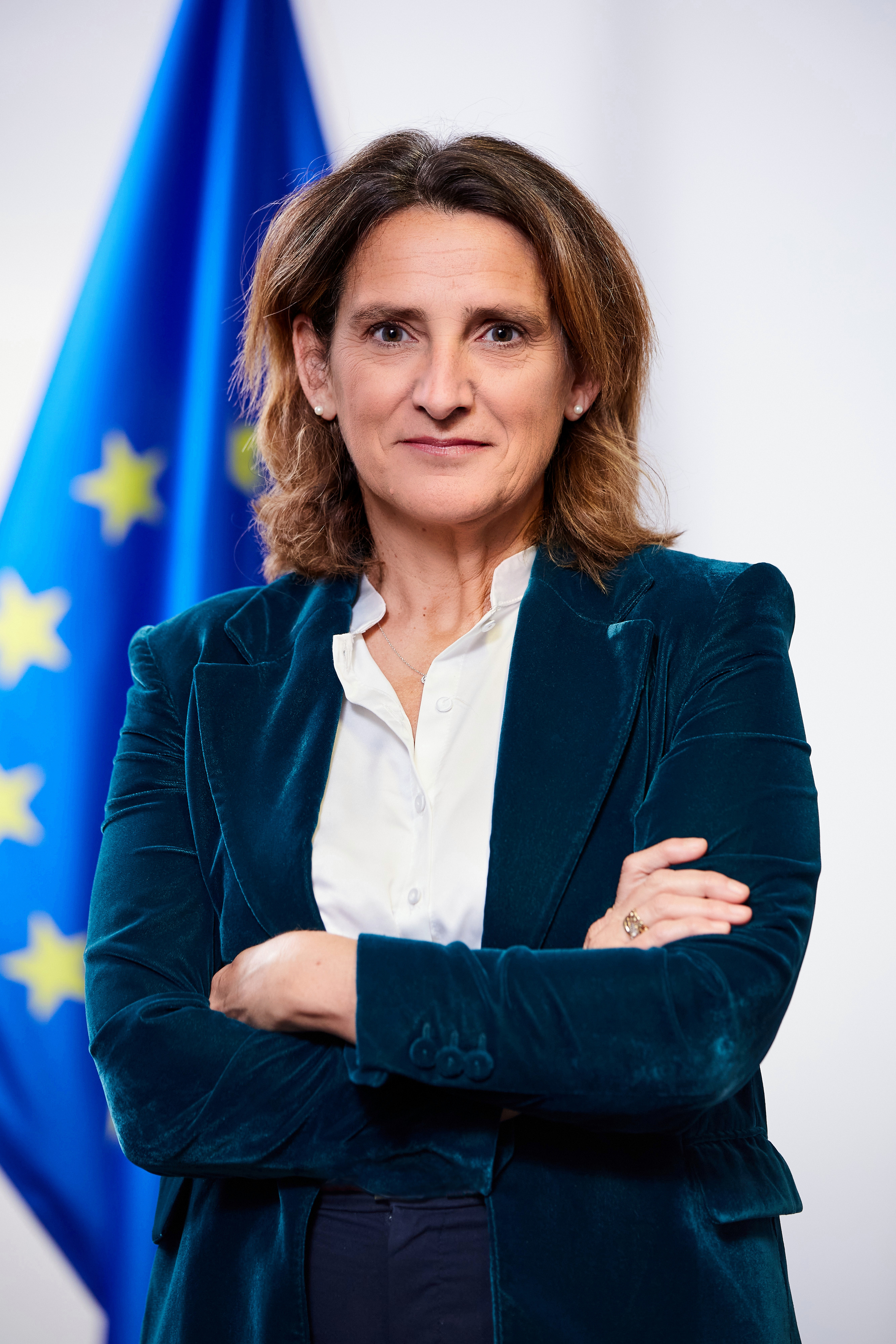
- Official portrait, 2024

First Executive Vice-President for Clean, Just and Competitive Transition of the European Commission
- Incumbent
- Assumed office 1 December 2024
- Commission: Von der Leyen II
- Preceded by: Maroš Šefčovič

European Commissioner for Competitiveness
- Incumbent
- Assumed office 1 December 2024
- Commission: Von der Leyen II
- Preceded by: Margrethe Vestager

Third Deputy Prime Minister of Spain
- In office 12 July 2021 – 25 November 2024 Serving with Nadia Calviño, María Jesús Montero and Yolanda Díaz
- Prime Minister: Pedro Sánchez
- Preceded by: Yolanda Díaz
- Succeeded by: Sara Aagesen

Minister for the Ecological Transition and the Demographic Challenge of Spain
- In office 7 June 2018 – 25 November 2024
- Prime Minister: Pedro Sánchez
- Preceded by: Isabel García Tejerina (environment); Álvaro Nadal (energy)
- Succeeded by: Sara Aagesen

Fourth Deputy Prime Minister of Spain
- In office 13 January 2020 – 12 July 2021 Serving with Carmen Calvo, Nadia Calviño and Yolanda Díaz
- Prime Minister: Pedro Sánchez
- Preceded by: Office established
- Succeeded by: María Jesús Montero

Member of the Congress of Deputies
- In office 17 August 2023 – 1 December 2023
- Succeeded by: Javier Rodríguez Palacios
- Constituency: Madrid
- In office 21 May 2019 – 21 February 2020
- Constituency: Madrid

Secretary of State for Climate Change
- In office 22 April 2008 – 30 December 2011
- Prime Minister: José Luis Rodríguez Zapatero
- Preceded by: Office established
- Succeeded by: Office abolished

Director of the Spanish Office for Climate Change
- In office 11 February 2005 – 22 April 2008
- Prime Minister: José Luis Rodríguez Zapatero

Personal details
- Born: Teresa Ribera Rodríguez; 19 May 1969 (age 57) Madrid, Spain
- Party: Spanish Socialist Worker's Party (2011–present)
- Other political affiliations: Independent (until 2011)
- Spouse: Mariano Bacigalupo
- Children: 3
- Education: Complutense University of Madrid
- Occupation: Jurist • Lawyer • Professor • Politician

Teresa Ribera Rodríguez (Note: Spanish pronunciation: [teˈɾesa riˈβeɾa]) (born 19 May 1969) is a Spanish jurist, civil servant, academic, and politician. Since 2024, she has served as the First Executive Vice-President of the European Commission for a Clean, Just, and Competitive Transition in the second von der Leyen Commission, while simultaneously holding the position of European Commissioner for Competitiveness.

Ribera previously held the position of Minister for the Ecological Transition of Spain from 2018, following Prime Minister Pedro Sánchez's rise to power after a successful no-confidence vote against Mariano Rajoy. In 2020, she was appointed Fourth Deputy Prime Minister, and in 2021, she was promoted to Third Deputy Prime Minister.

Earlier in her career, from 2005 to 2008, Ribera served as Director of the Spanish Office for Climate Change. From 2008 to 2011, she served as Secretary of State for Climate Change during the second administration of Prime Minister José Luis Rodríguez Zapatero. Between 2014 and 2018, she was Director of the Institute for Sustainable Development and International Relations (IDDRI) in Paris.

== Early years and education ==
Ribera was born on 19 May 1969 in Madrid. She graduated with a Bachelor of Laws from the Complutense University of Madrid in 1992, with further studies at the Center for Constitutional Studies attaining her another degree in constitutional law and political science.

== Early career ==
Ribera belongs to the Superior Body of Civil Administrators of the State of which she has been a surplus official since 2012. Ribera has been an adjunct professor of the Department of Public Law and Philosophy of Law at the Autonomous University of Madrid.

Ribera has held various technical positions in public administration, such as the position of Chief of Coordination of the Ministry of Development and of Technical Adviser in the Cabinet of the Assistant Secretary for the Environment and Head of the Compliance and Development area. Between 2004 and 2008 she was general director of the Office of Climate Change and between 2008 and 2011 she assumed the Secretary of State for Climate Change (in the Ministry of Agriculture and Fisheries, Food and Environment) during the government of president José Luis Rodríguez Zapatero.

== International work ==
Ribera is also a member of several advisory councils, including the Global Leadership Council of the United Nations Sustainable Development Solutions Network (UNSDSN), the global climate change advisory council of the World Economic Forum, and the Momentum For Change initiative of United Nations Framework Convention on Climate Change (UNFCCC); belongs to the international council of the BC3, to the advisory council of the Institut pour la Recherche du Développement (IRD) and to the patronages of Fundipax and Fundación Alternativas. In September 2013, she began to collaborate with the Institute for Sustainable Development and International Relations (IDDRI), based in Paris, and in June 2014 she assumed its direction. The organization is dedicated to the analysis of strategic issues related to sustainable development, climate change, protection of biodiversity, food security and management of the urbanization process.

In May 2014, the prosecutor's office denounced the development of a gas storage site, called Project Castor, which was halted because of seismic activity. Environmental prevaricación was alleged, and one of the accusations was directed against Teresa Ribera because when the project was approved by the Government in 2008, she occupied the State Secretariat of Climate Change and was the person who signed the environmental impact assessment by which the project was authorized. In 2015, 18 people were charged from the Geological and Mining Institute of Spain and the General Directorate of Quality and Environmental Evaluation. However, they held posts of a technical nature and no politicians were charged, including Ribera. In 2015, she joined Pedro Sánchez's expert panel to prepare the Socialist Party's electoral program.

== Political career ==
=== Minister for the Ecological Transition ===
In June 2018, it was announced that Ribera would be the Minister for the Ecological Transition of the Sánchez government, following the motion of censure that the PSOE presented against the previous government of Mariano Rajoy (PP) and that was approved by the Congress of Deputies. On 1 June 2018, Sánchez appointed her as Minister in the new Spanish government. Felipe VI sanctioned by royal decree of June her appointment as holder of the portfolio of Minister for the Ecological Transition. On 7 June she took office as Minister before the King at Palace of Zarzuela.

The first measures that Ribera carried out as minister was to end the so-called "sun tax" to allow the free production of power in an effort to increase ecological power and to reduce the price of electricity. In an effort to end coal pollution and to transform the power production of Spain, Ribera reached an agreement with unions to close most of the coal mines that still survived in the north of the country by investing €250 million to avoid a fall in the miners' standard of living and to restore the environmental balance of the area.

In a letter sent to their counterparts in the European Commission – Miguel Arias Cañete and Pierre Moscovici – in May 2019, Ribera and Budget Minister María Jesús Montero called on the European Union to assess a potential carbon tax on power imports to protect the bloc's interests and help it to pursue its environmental targets amid growing public concern over climate change.

Under Ribera's leadership, the Spanish government stepped in to host the 2019 United Nations Climate Change Conference after riots over inequality prompted Chile to withdraw with just one month's notice.

=== Deputy Prime Minister ===
On 13 January 2020, Ribera assumed the office of Fourth Deputy Prime Minister and Minister for the Ecological Transition and Demographic Challenge before the King in Zarzuela Palace in the Sánchez second cabinet. It was the first time in the history of Spain that a government would have four vice-presidencies.

In April 2020, the Prime Minister commissioned Ribera to carry out the plan to ease the lockdown, that is, the way in which the country would exit the State of Alarm activated due to the COVID-19 viral pandemic. For this objective, Ribera organized a group of experts in all areas, from economics to epidemiologists. In statements to EFE news agency in April, Ribera said that the recovery should be done with "green" and "solidary" measures. She then called for a "Green New Deal" for Spain to both further environmentalism and help the country get out of the national lockdown. She stated in May that tourism, which accounts for 12% of Spanish GDP, was of "particular concern" when it came to the impending economic recession in Spain due to the coronavirus.

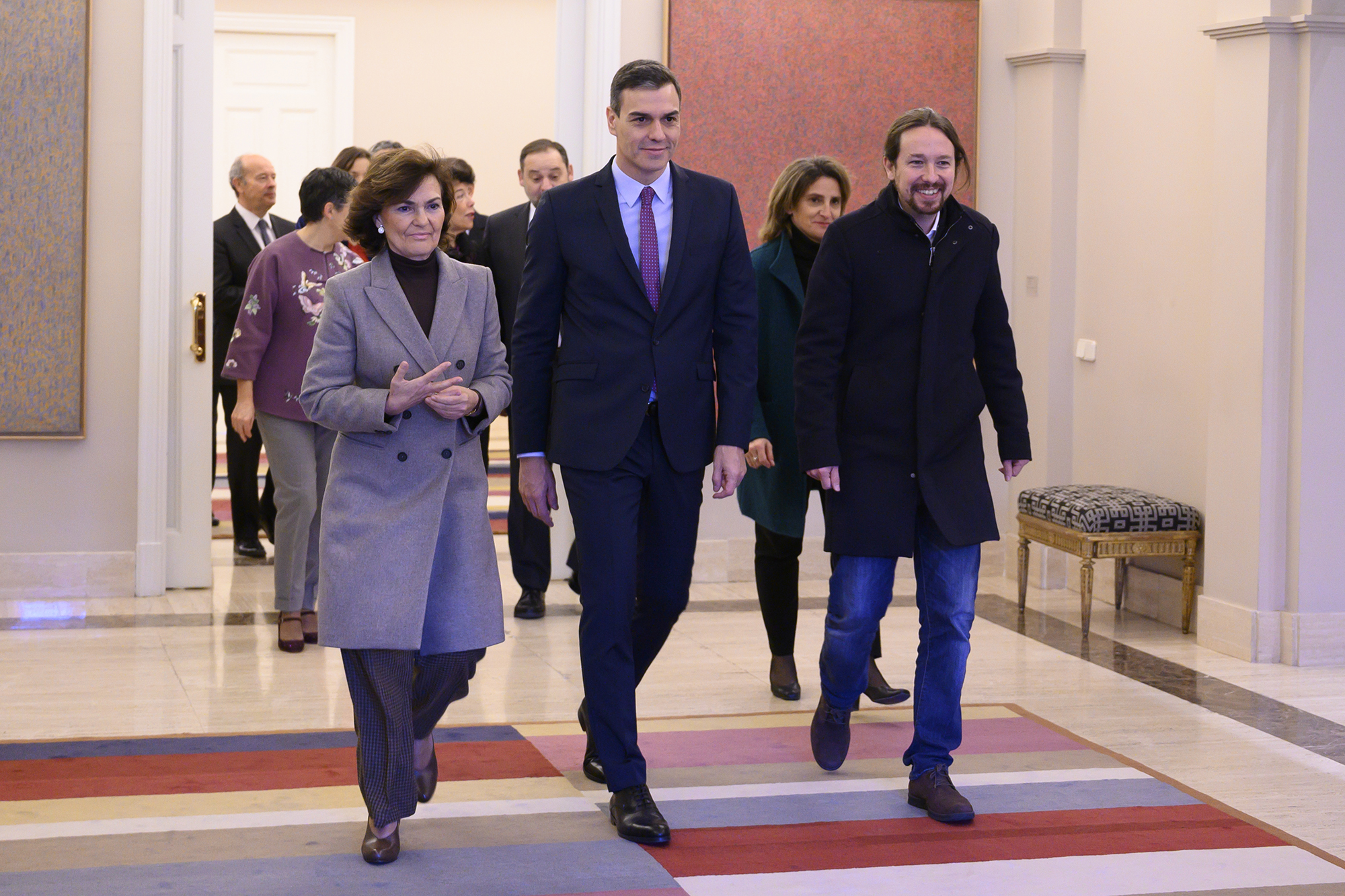
Ribera with Spanish Prime Minister Pedro Sánchez, Deputy Prime Minister Carmen Calvo and Podemos leader Pablo Iglesias Turrión, 14 January 2020

On 15 December 2020, Ribera was one of the first European ministers to declare that if it was not possible to make the Energy Charter Treaty compatible with the Paris Agreement, there would be no choice but to withdraw from it.

In July 2021, after the resignation of Second DPM Pablo Iglesias, Ribera's post was suppressed and she was appointed Third Deputy Prime Minister.

In May 2021, the Spanish parliament passed the Climate Change and Energy Transition Act.

In late 2021, the cabinet approved Ribera's 16.3 billion euro energy plan, which is to allocate 6.9 billion euros ($7.8 billion) to renewables, green hydrogen and energy storage over two years and to attract another 9.45 billion euros in private funding under its COVID-19 recovery plan.

Ribera, along with Shauna Aminath, led the working group at the 2022 United Nations Climate Change Conference that facilitated consultations on mitigation.

=== European Commissioner ===
On 17 September 2024, the president of the European Commission, Ursula von der Leyen, announced the composition of the College of Commissioners for the period 2024–2029. In the case of Teresa Ribera, who had been proposed by the Government of Spain as commissioner, she was chosen to occupy the Competition portfolio, one of the most relevant of the commission, as well as an executive vice presidency in charge of environmental affairs, energy transition and competition.

During her hearings for her commissioner's role, the European People's Party questioned Ribera over the management of the disastrous flash floods of October in Valencia, accusing her of ignoring the needs to update, drain and improve the Rambla del Poyo as the head of the Ministry of Environment. Despite this initial opposition, her appointment was approved by Parliament on 27 November 2024, assuming the office on 1 December.

Ribera expressed support for the European Green Deal and the green transition. She said in an interview with El Pais: "Ursula Von der Leyen has given me a vice presidency: It's a signal that [the green agenda] remains a priority. Environmental transition is one of the great engines of the approaching economic and industrial transformation." In December 2024, Ribera warned that the commission would not postpone the ban on the sale of combustion engine cars in the EU after 2035.

On 7 August 2025, Ribera became the first high-ranking acting member of the EC to accuse the state of Israel of committing genocide against Palestinians in the Gaza war. The European Commission has distanced itself from Ribera's claim that Israel is committing genocide in Gaza.

According to a study by scientists from Utrecht University published in August 2025, the Atlantic meridional overturning circulation (AMOC) could start to collapse as early as the 2060s. The collapse of the AMOC would be a severe climate catastrophe, resulting in a cooling of the Northern Hemisphere. Ribera suggested that AMOC should be "added to the list of national security acronyms in Europe" given the serious consequences of AMOC's collapse.

In her address at the Escuela Diplomática de Verano in Madrid in June 2026, she presented a strategic blueprint highlighting how the green transition serves as an economic necessity to strengthen EU industrial competitiveness and energy independence. She warned automakers in 2024 that the European Commission will not delay or roll back its planned 2035 ban on new internal combustion engine car sales.

== Recognition ==
- 2018 – Climate Reality Project Award in the category of 'Public Personality', awarded by the Climate Reality Project

== See also ==
- List of Complutense University of Madrid people
