= Third Deputy Prime Minister of Spain =

Spanish senior governmental position

- Vicepresidencia Tercera del Gobierno de España
- Coat of arms of Spain

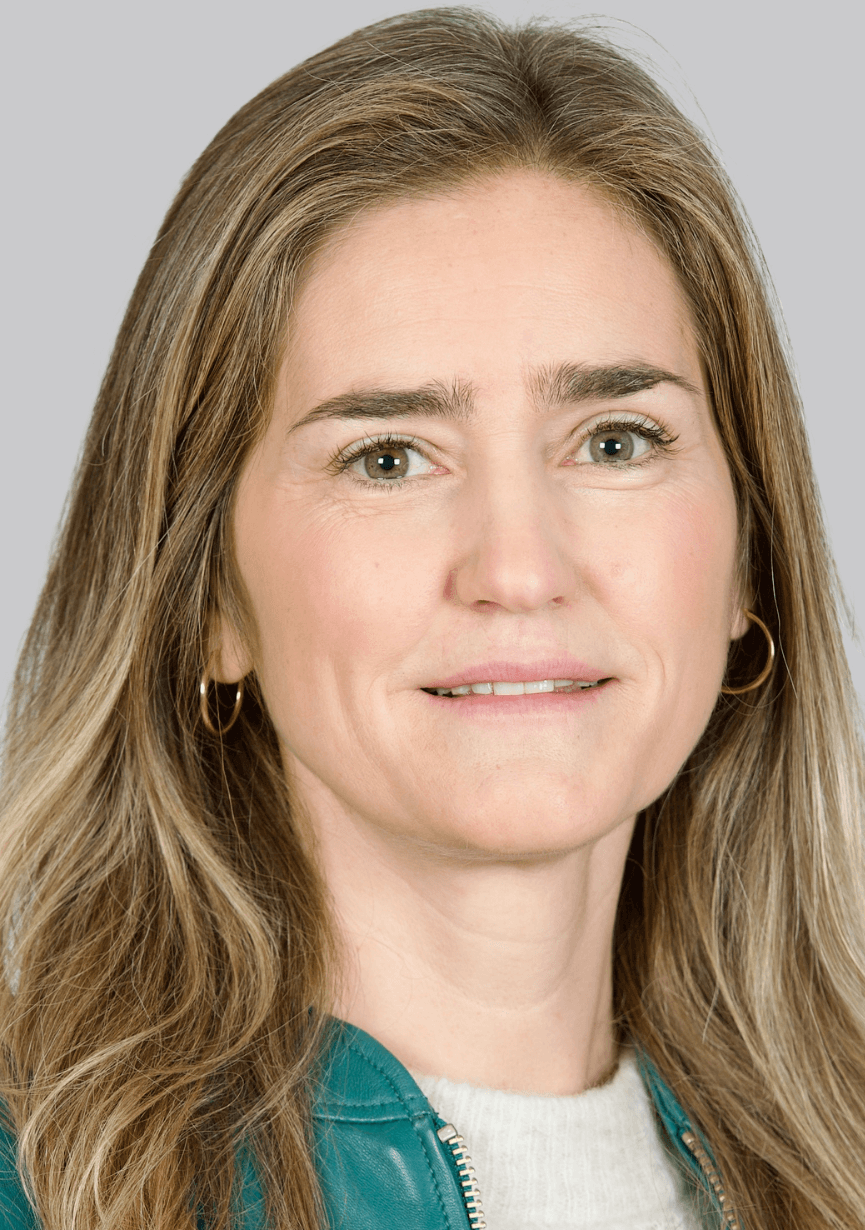
- Incumbent; Sara Aagesen since 25 November 2024
- Government of Spain; Council of Ministers
- Style: Excelentísimo/a Señor/a
- Member of: Cabinet
- Residence: Palacio de la Moncloa
- Seat: Madrid, Spain
- Nominator: Prime Minister
- Appointer: Monarch; Countersigned by the Prime Minister of Spain
- Term length: No fixed term No term limits
- Constituting instrument: Organic Act of the State of 1967 (original); Constitution of 1978 (current)
- Formation: 3 January 1974 (52 years ago)
- First holder: Licinio de la Fuente

The third deputy prime minister of Spain, officially the third vice president of the Government (Spanish: Vicepresidente tercero del Gobierno), is a senior member of the Government of Spain. The office is not a permanent position, existing only at the discretion of the prime minister.

It has rarely been utilized, being occupied three times in the last years of the Franco dictatorship and three times in the following democratic period (1977–1978; 2009–2011; and since 2020).

The office does not possess special constitutional powers beyond its responsibility as a member of the Council of Ministers. The position is regulated by the Government Act of 1997 and only specifies that the office's purpose is to replace the PM when that office is empty due to a vacancy, absence, or illness. The third deputy PM only assumes this responsibility if the first and second deputies cannot.

== History ==
Like the position of second deputy PM, the office of third deputy PM was created in January 1974, although its legal framework dates back to the 1967 Organic Law of the State. The first person to hold this position was Licinio de la Fuente, who was also Minister of Labour. De la Fuente distanced himself greatly from PM Arias Navarro, strongly criticizing the position of third deputy PM as symbolic and without possession of any extra powers. This distancing increased when the prime minister refused to create a Government Delegated Committee to deal with social issues, a committee that De la Fuente wanted to chair. After many arguments with the government members and the PM, De la Fuente resigned on March 5, 1975.

De la Fuente was replaced by Fernando Suárez González as both Third Deputy and Labour Minister, and he managed to pass laws of De la Fuente's that were left pending. A few months later, Navarro appointed Juan-Miguel Villar Mir as Third Deputy, as well as Minister of Economy and Finance.

Adolfo Suárez did not use this position until his second term, in 1977, appointing Third Deputy PM Fernando Abril Martorell. The official title of Abril Martorell was Deputy Prime Minister for Political Affairs, and he was mainly responsible for the relations between the Government and Parliament.

Afterwards, the position was not used for more than 30 years, until 2009 when PM Zapatero appointed Manuel Chaves as Third Deputy PM and Minister of Territorial Policy. Chaves left office in 2011 when he was promoted to Second Deputy.

The conservative PM Mariano Rajoy never used this position, and PM Pedro Sánchez did not use it in his first government, but did in his second one. Sánchez appointed Economic Affairs Minister Nadia Calviño as Third Deputy PM in 2020, and she served until 2021 when she was promoted to Second Deputy, with Labour Minister Yolanda Díaz replacing her as Third Deputy.

== List of officeholders ==
Office name:

- Third Vice Presidency of the Government (1974–1975; 1977–1978; 2009–2011; 2020–present)
- Vice Presidency of the Government for Economic Affairs (1975–1976)

| Portrait | Name (Lifespan) | Term of office | | | Party | Government | Prime Minister (Tenure) | Ref. |
| Portrait | Name (Lifespan) | Took office | Left office | Duration | Party | Government | Prime Minister (Tenure) | Ref. |
|---|---|---|---|---|---|---|---|---|
| | Licinio de la Fuente (1923–2015) | 4 January 1974 | 5 March 1975 | 1 year and 60 days | National; Movement (FET–JONS) | Arias Navarro I | Carlos Arias Navarro (1973–1976) | |
| | Fernando Suárez González (1933–2024) | 5 March 1975 | 12 December 1975 | 282 days | National; Movement (Nonpartisan) | Arias Navarro I | Carlos Arias Navarro (1973–1976) | |
| | Juan Miguel Villar Mir (1931–2024) | 12 December 1975 | 5 July 1976 | 206 days | National; Movement (Nonpartisan) | Arias Navarro II | Carlos Arias Navarro (1973–1976) | |
Office disestablished during this interval
| | Fernando Abril Martorell (1936–1998) | 5 July 1977 | 25 February 1978 | 235 days | Independent | Suárez II | Adolfo Suárez (1976–1981) | |
Office disestablished during this interval
| | Manuel Chaves (born 1945) | 7 April 2009 | 12 July 2011 | 2 years and 96 days | PSOE | Zapatero II | José Luis; Rodríguez Zapatero (2004–2011) | |
Office disestablished during this interval
| | Nadia Calviño (born 1968) | 13 January 2020 | 31 March 2021 | 1 year and 77 days | Independent | Sánchez II | Pedro Sánchez (2018–present) | |
| | Yolanda Díaz (born 1971) | 31 March 2021 | 12 July 2021 | 103 days | PCE | Sánchez II | Pedro Sánchez (2018–present) | |
| | Teresa Ribera (born 1969) | 12 July 2021 | 21 November 2023 | 3 years and 136 days | PSOE | Sánchez II | Pedro Sánchez (2018–present) | |
| | Teresa Ribera (born 1969) | 21 November 2023 | 25 November 2024 | 3 years and 136 days | PSOE | Sánchez III | Pedro Sánchez (2018–present) | |
| | Sara Aagesen (born 1976) | 25 November 2024 | Incumbent | 1 year and 287 days | Independent | Sánchez III | Pedro Sánchez (2018–present) | |

== See also ==
- Deputy Prime Minister of Spain
- Second Deputy Prime Minister of Spain
- Fourth Deputy Prime Minister of Spain
