= José Enrique Martínez Genique =

Spanish politician

Minister of Agriculture of Spain
- In office 5 July 1977 – 25 February 1978
- Prime Minister: Adolfo Suárez
- Preceded by: Fernando Abril Martorell
- Succeeded by: Jaime Lamo de Espinosa

Personal details
- Born: José Enrique Martínez Genique; 2 January 1935 Ávila, Spain
- Party: Independent

José Enrique Martínez Genique (born 2 January 1935) is a Spanish politician who served as Minister of Agriculture of Spain between 1977 and 1978.
