= Javier Rodríguez Palacios =

Spanish politician (born 1972)

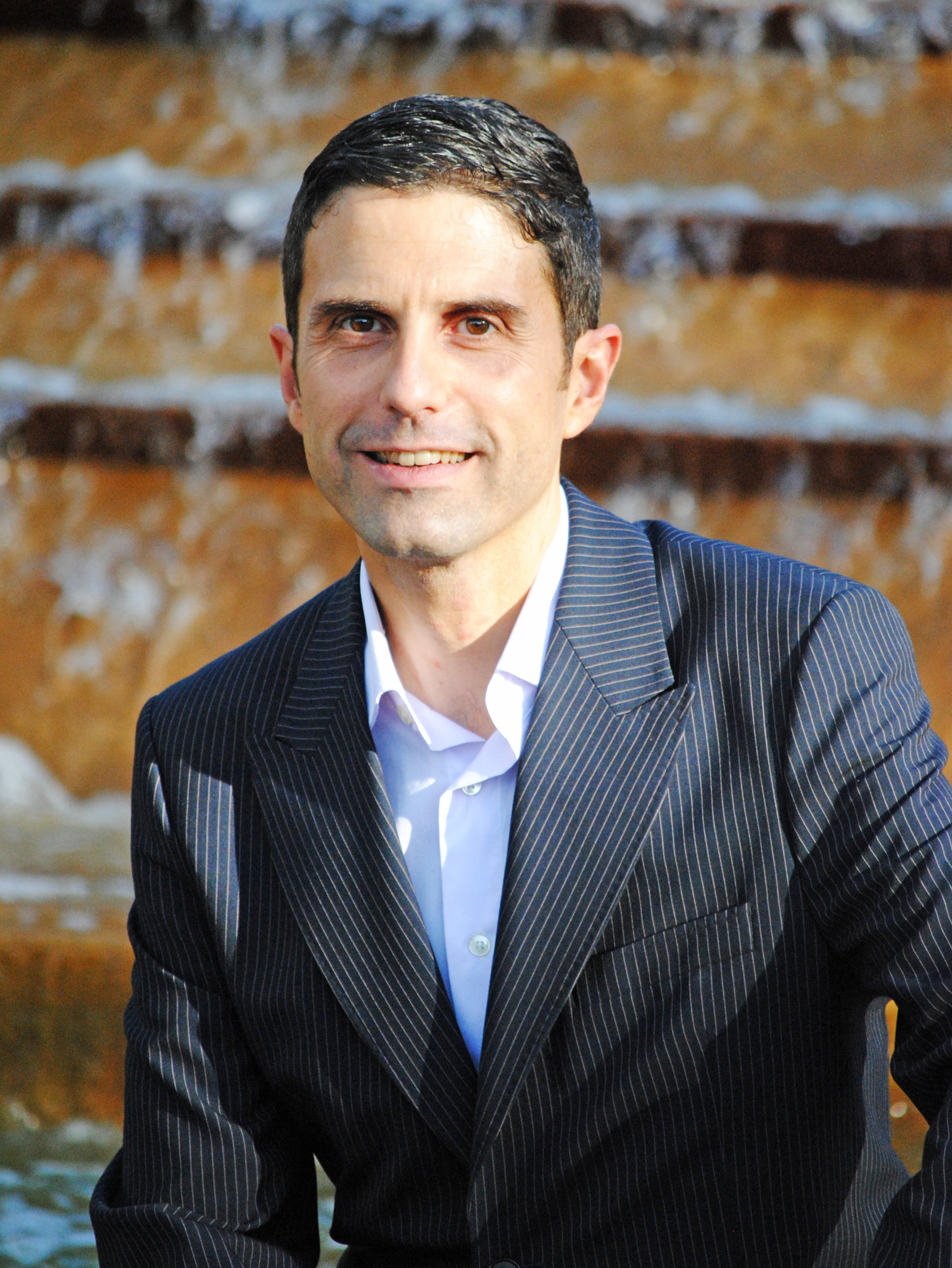
- Rodríguez in 2011

Member of the Congress of Deputies
- Incumbent
- Assumed office 5 December 2023
- Preceded by: Teresa Ribera
- Constituency: Madrid

Personal details
- Born: 5 April 1972 (age 54)
- Party: Spanish Socialist Workers' Party

Javier Rodríguez Palacios (born 5 April 1972) is a Spanish politician serving as a member of the Congress of Deputies since 2023. From 2015 to 2023, he served as mayor of Alcalá de Henares.
