= Suso Díaz =

Spanish trade unionist (1944–2025)

Suso Díaz (8 September 1944 – 8 July 2025), also known as Xesús Díaz, was a Spanish trade unionist.

== Life and career ==
Ferrol-born Díaz began his career at the age of 14 in the shipyards of Astano (now Navantia Fene) where he came into contact with workers' movements. In 1962 he participated in his first strike and joined the clandestine Workers' Commissions and the PCE during the Franco dictatorship, which led to two arrests and a period of imprisonment.

In 1978, with the legalisation of trade unions, he joined the management of CCOO Galicia. During his term as general secretary he promoted the creation of the 10 March Foundation and promoted the recognition of 10 March as the Day of the Galician Working Class. He received the 10 de Març Award (2010) and the Luís Tilve Foundation Award (2023). He participated in the Commission for the Recovery of Historical Memory and in SOS Public Health, and gave symbolic support to the Sumar candidacies in 2023 and 2024.

Díaz died of cancer on 8 July 2025, at the age of 80. His daughter is politician Yolanda Díaz.
