= Yolanda Díaz =

Spanish politician and lawyer (born 1971)

The Most Excellent Yolanda Díaz MP
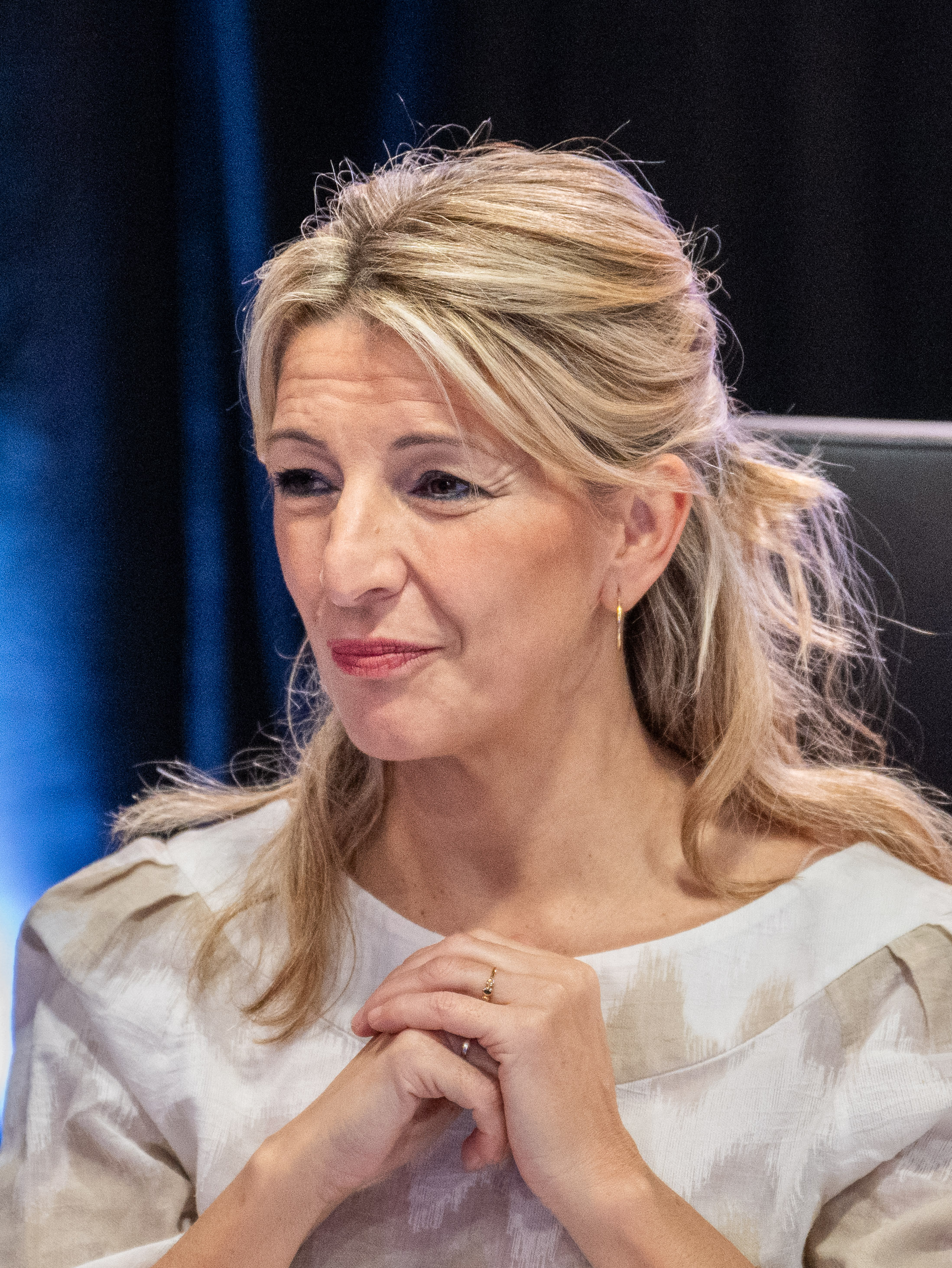
- Díaz in 2024

Second Deputy Prime Minister of Spain
- Incumbent
- Assumed office 12 July 2021 Serving with Carlos Cuerpo and Sara Aagesen
- Monarch: Felipe VI
- Prime Minister: Pedro Sánchez
- Preceded by: Nadia Calviño

Minister of Labour and Social Economy of Spain
- Incumbent
- Assumed office 13 January 2020
- Monarch: Felipe VI
- Prime Minister: Pedro Sánchez
- Preceded by: Magdalena Valerio

Third Deputy Prime Minister of Spain
- In office 31 March 2021 – 12 July 2021 Serving with Carmen Calvo, Nadia Calviño and Teresa Ribera
- Monarch: Felipe VI
- Prime Minister: Pedro Sánchez
- Preceded by: Nadia Calviño
- Succeeded by: Teresa Ribera

Member of the Congress of Deputies
- Incumbent
- Assumed office 13 January 2016
- Constituency: A Coruña (2016–2019); Pontevedra (2019–2023); Madrid (2023–present)

Member of the Parliament of Galicia
- In office 13 November 2012 – 4 January 2016
- Constituency: A Coruña
Additional positions
First Deputy Mayor of Ferrol
In office 17 June 2007 – 18 October 2008
National Coordinator of Esquerda Unida
In office 7 November 2005 – 3 June 2017
Preceded by	Pilar Díaz
Succeeded by	Eva Solla
Member of the Ferrol City Council
In office 14 June 2003 – 13 November 2012

Personal details
- Born: Yolanda Díaz Pérez; 6 May 1971 (age 55) Fene, Spain
- Party: Communist Party of Spain (1986–present); Movimiento Sumar (2023–present)
- Other political affiliations: United Left (1986–2019)
- Spouse: Juan Andrés Meizoso (m. 2004)
- Children: 1
- Education: University of Santiago de Compostela
- Occupation: Labour lawyer; politician

Yolanda Díaz Pérez (Spanish: [ɟʝoˈlanda ˈði.aθ]; born 6 May 1971) is a Spanish politician and labour lawyer, currently serving as Second Deputy Prime Minister since 2021, and Minister of Labour and Social Economy of the Government of Spain since 2020. A longtime member of the Communist Party of Spain, in 2023 she founded the electoral alliance Sumar, as well as its instrumental party Movimiento Sumar, resigning as the leader of the alliance in 2024. She has been a member of the Congress of Deputies since 2016, having previously been a Ferrol municipal councillor (2003–2012) and member of the Parliament of Galicia (2012–2016). She was also the National Coordinator of Esquerda Unida (EU) from 2005 to 2017.

== Early life and education ==
Born in San Valentín, Fene, on 6 May 1971, next to the shipyard of Astilleros y Talleres del Noroeste (ASTANO), Díaz is a member of a family of renowned trade unionists in Galicia who were strongly involved in anti-Francoist activism. Her father was Suso Díaz (1944–2025).

Díaz graduated with a licentiate degree in law from the University of Santiago de Compostela (USC), and later earned three post-graduate degrees. Upon concluding her studies, she commenced working as a paralegal for a law firm. Later, she registered as an attorney at law and opened her own law firm, which specialised in labour law.

== Political career ==
=== Career in regional politics ===
Díaz joined the Communist Party of Spain (PCE) at an early age, before entering institutional politics in 2003, when she became member of the Ferrol municipal council. In 2005, she was elected leader (National Coordinator) of Esquerda Unida (EU), the Galician federation of United Left (IU).

Díaz stood as candidate in the list of the Galician Left Alternative (AGE) coalition between EU and Anova in the October 2012 Galician regional election, (Note: She hired a then relatively unknown Pablo Iglesias Turrión as an aide for the electoral campaign.) becoming a member of the 9th Parliament of Galicia, representing the constituency of A Coruña.

=== Career in national politics ===
Díaz ran as a candidate for En Marea in the 2015 Spanish general election, becoming a member of the 11th session of the Lower House of the Spanish parliament. She retained her seat in the 2016, April 2019, and November 2019 general elections, running as candidate for the En Marea in the former, and for En Común–Unidas Podemos and Galicia en Común in the latter. She left the role of EU Coordinator General in June 2017, and was replaced by Eva Solla.

Following the failure of talks to build a coalition government between the PSOE and Unidas Podemos in the summer of 2019, Díaz spoke out in favour of such a coalition, unlike other voices within IU. She advocated the sole investiture of Pedro Sánchez, while reaching an agreement on a programme for government. She distanced herself from IU over disagreements over how IU had handled the negotiations and eventually left the party in October 2019, while remaining a member of the PCE.

=== Minister of Labour, 2020–present ===
Appointed as minister of Labour and Social Economy of the Sánchez II Government, Díaz was sworn in on 13 January 2020. Díaz, who put the struggle against precarious work as the main goal of her mandate, vowed to repeal the 2012 labour market reform. She chose Joaquín Pérez Rey to hold the post of Secretary of State for Labour and Social Economy, making him the effective second-in-command in the Ministry.

As Minister of Labour, Díaz took part in the negotiations that paved the way for the increase of the minimum wage to 950 euros per month, in addition to outlawing employee dismissal for medical leave. She also took part in the dispatch of labour inspections to the agricultural sector to monitor the working conditions of rural workers. In response to the COVID-19 pandemic, Díaz negotiated with unions and employers the implementation of a furlough scheme (in Spanish, Expediente de Regulación Temporal de Empleo - ERTE) and its extensions, as well as the creation of the 'Working From Home Law' (in Spanish, Ley del Teletrabajo).

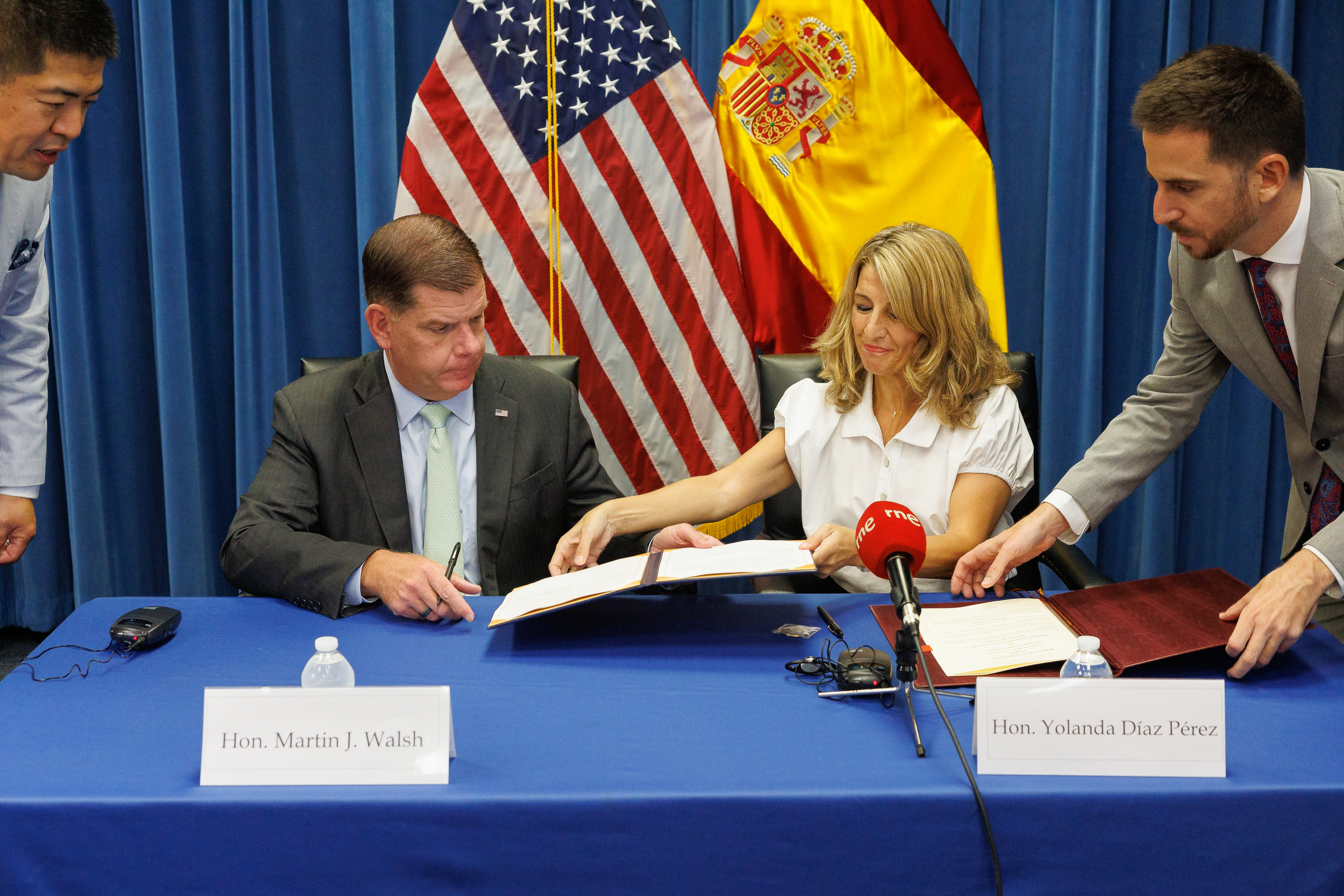
U.S. Secretary of Labor Marty Walsh hosts MOU signing ceremony with Yolanda Díaz.

On 15 March 2021, the then second vice-president of the government, Pablo Iglesias, announced that he would leave the post to run as Podemos candidate for the regional elections in the Community of Madrid, which had been brought forward due to the collapse of the conservative government of Isabel Díaz Ayuso formed by PP and Ciudadanos, with the support of Vox. Announcing his candidacy, Pablo Iglesias handed over the vice-presidency to Yolanda Díaz as his successor, who officially accepted the position that same day. On the same Monday, in a press conference from Montauban, the President of the Government, Pedro Sánchez, also confirmed the succession of the vice-presidency to Díaz, declaring that he had "the highest regard" for her. In July 2021, Díaz was promoted from third to second Deputy Prime Minister.

In November, Díaz announced her intention to create a political platform to contest in the next Spanish general elections, starting a "listening process" after the Christmas holidays, popularly identified by the media as a "broad front". That same month, Díaz also announced that by the end of 2022 labour reforms under Mariano Rajoy would be abolished and replaced. It was finally approved on 3 February 2022.

Also in November 2021, Díaz led a group of left-leaning female leaders (Ada Colau, Mónica Oltra, Mónica García, and Fátima Hamed Hossain) in unveiling a new initiative called Otras Políticas, a play on words meaning both "other female politicians" and "other policies".

On 18 May 2022, Díaz publicly announced a new electoral platform named Sumar ("Unite"), with the intention to contest in the 2023 Spanish general election. The platform was also registered as a political party under the name Movimiento Sumar ("Unite Movement" in English) in order to form coalitions with other leftist parties.

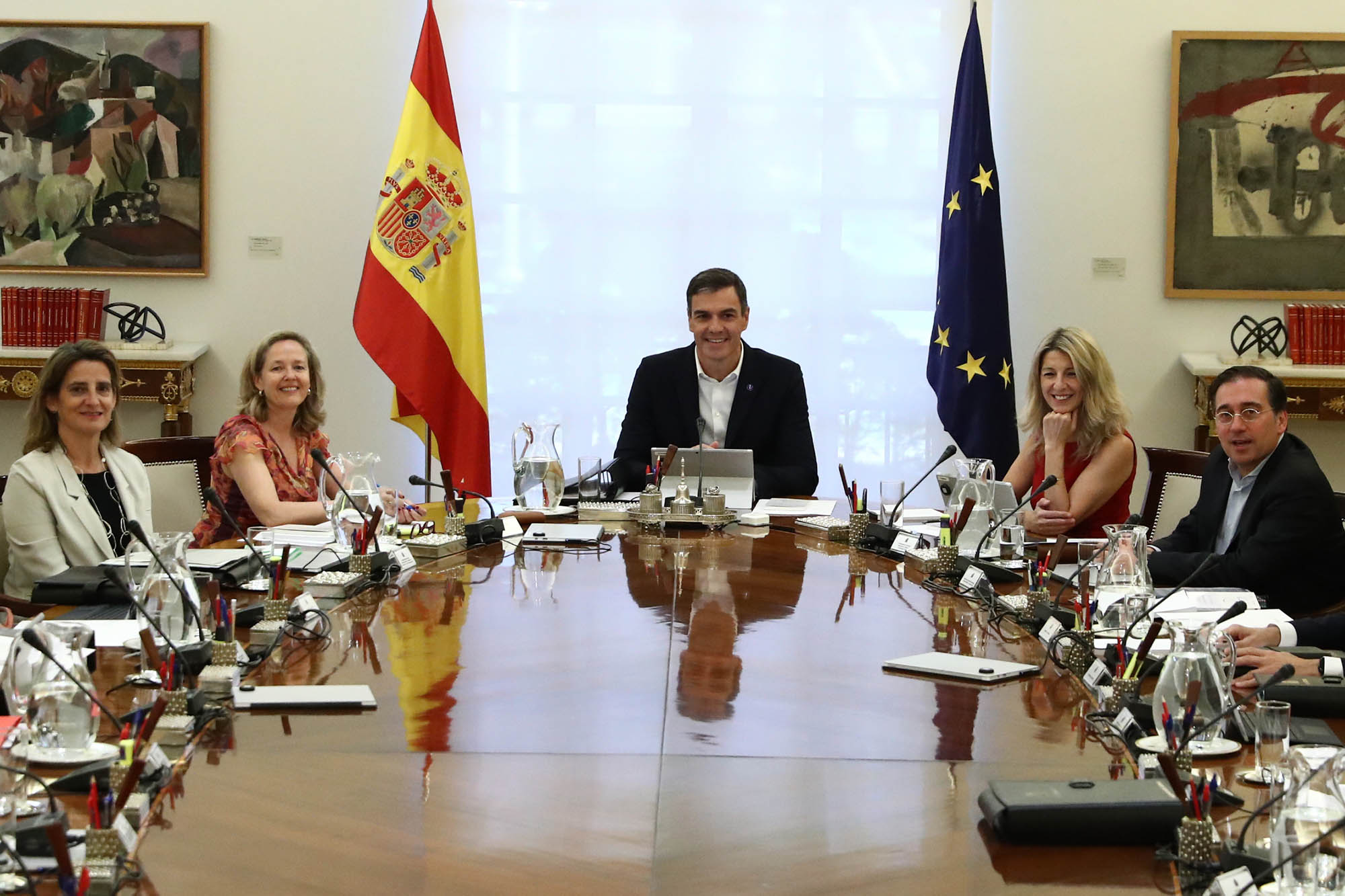
Díaz with Spanish Prime Minister Pedro Sánchez in July 2023

In November 2023, she was ratified in her government positions for the third government of Pedro Sánchez.

=== Leaving Sumar's leadership ===
The Sumar electoral coalition participated in the regional elections of Galicia, the Basque Country and Catalonia at the beginning of 2024. In none of these elections did it achieve good results. Yolanda Díaz maintained her intention to run in the European elections on 9 June, with Estrella Galán at the helm. In these elections, Sumar obtained three seats out of 61, results valued negatively by the members of the coalition, especially by United Left, a party that was left without parliamentary representation as its MEP, Manu Pineda, lost re-election due to him being placed fourth on the list. As a consequence, on 10 June 2024, Díaz announced that she was leaving her leadership positions at Sumar, remaining as deputy prime minister and labour minister.

Despite her resignation, Díaz keeps great influence in the political party, being the de facto leader of Sumar. Díaz is member of the governing board of the party as a "permanent guest".

== Political positions ==
Diaz, still a member of the Communist Party of Spain, now avoids declaring herself as one and focuses entirely on left-wing voters, although she has praised the regimes of Fidel Castro in Cuba and of Hugo Chávez in Venezuela in the past.

In 2021, Díaz wrote positively of The Communist Manifesto, stating that "Throughout all this time, The Communist Manifesto has continued to develop its programmatic character to the tempo of the century, with its global economic crises and great revolutions. Capitalism has been ever present in all of its diverse and voracious mutations, ready to engulf, corrupt, and disintegrate the very reality that constitutes it, but without ever being able to escape the theories of Marx and the transforming power of this text. A book that speaks to us of utopias encrypted in our present and in which beats, today as yesterday, a vital and passionate defense of democracy and freedom."

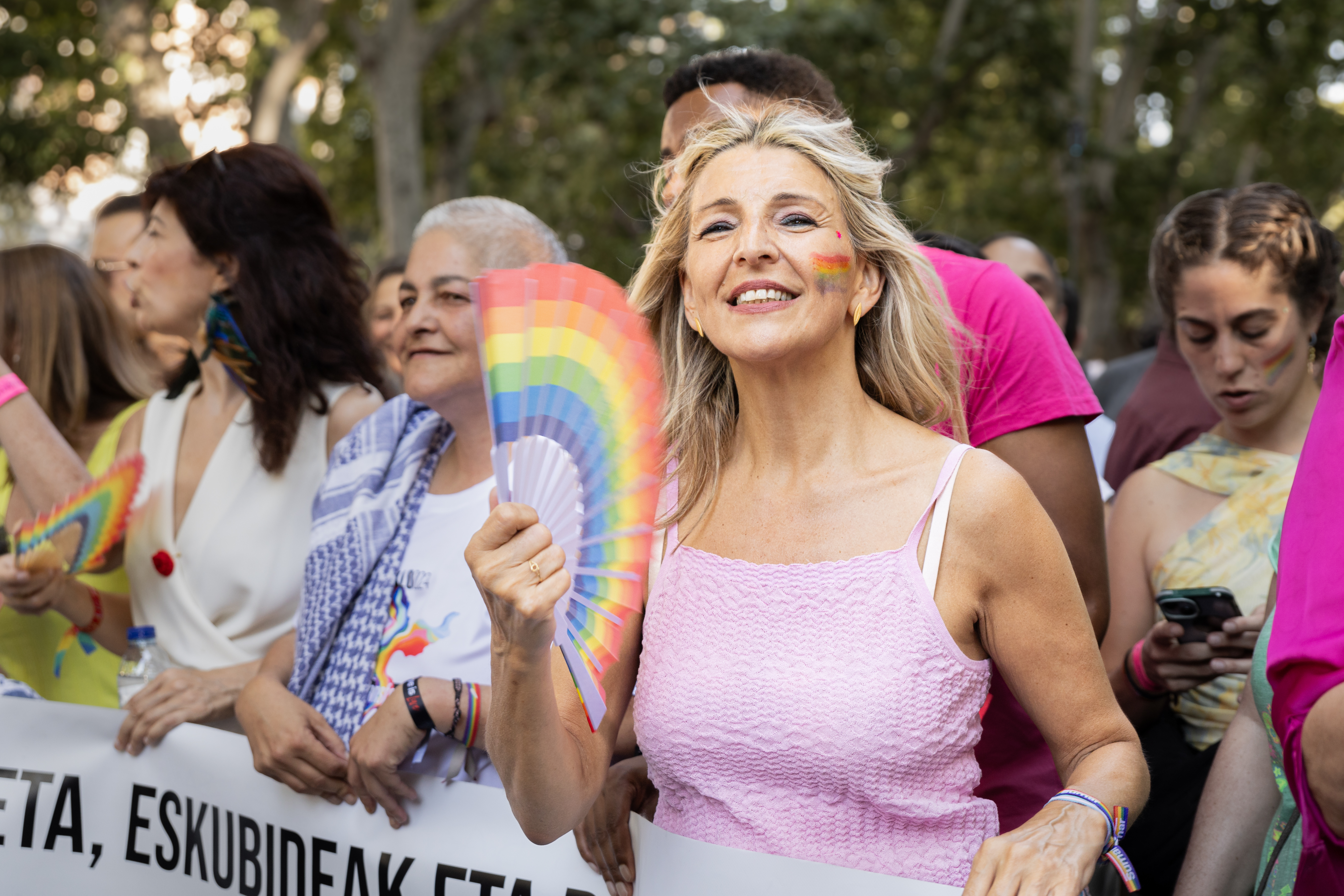
Díaz at the 2024 Madrid Pride Parade

While campaigning for 2023 elections in Madrid, she expressed her desire to break with bipartisan politics. Though Diaz describes herself as an atheist, she claims meeting Pope Francis, who regularly criticised uncontrolled capitalism, was "the most important encounter" of her life, and the two kept in touch because they "have so much in common."

In 2023, Díaz defended the social record of the coalition, arguing that "Despite the "re-armament of the defense of neoliberal policies" in this progressive coalition government "we have been able to deconstruct the myths of capitalism." She cited examples such as measures to prevent unemployment, a reduction in the gender pay gap, and a fall in the temporary employment rate.

Díaz firmly opposes holding an independence referendum in Catalonia and emphasizes that the only solution is dialogue and a peaceful resolution to the issue, asserting that Catalonia will remain part of Spain in her country model.

In October 2023, Díaz called on the international community to put pressure on Israel to stop what she called a massacre in Gaza. In reaction to Spain's decision to recognize Palestine as an independent state, Díaz declared: "We can't stop here, Palestine will be free from the river to the sea" in May 2024.

In January 2024, Díaz committed to making the next step of reducing the working week from 40 hours to 37.5 hours, without any reduction in pay. She also proposed opening "a major social debate" on the "rationalisation of working hours", given that Spanish workers on average finish their working day later than their European counterparts. The right-wing opposition parties strongly opposed this plan. Vox went so far as to claim that the government wanted to ban "joy and celebration" and impose "communist terror".

In February 2026, Díaz criticized all X users, claiming the platform promoted "policies of hate" and announcing she had stopped using it. Her remarks sparked controversy and critics saw it as part of a broader push for stricter regulation of online speech.
