= Enrique Fuentes Quintana =

Spanish politician (1924–2007)

Second Deputy Prime Minister of Spain
- In office 5 July 1977 – 25 February 1978
- Prime Minister: Adolfo Suárez
- Preceded by: Alfonso Osorio
- Succeeded by: Fernando Abril Martorell

Personal details
- Born: 13 December 1924 Carrión de los Condes (Palencia), Spain
- Died: 6 June 2007 (aged 82) Madrid, Spain
- Party: Independent
- Education: Complutense University of Madrid

Enrique Fuentes Quintana (1924 – 2007) was a Spanish economist, academic and politician, who served as deputy prime minister of Spain between 1977 and 1979 in the first cabinet after the Francoist State.

== Early life and education ==
Fuentes was born in Carrión de los Condes, Palencia, on 13 December 1924. His family were mostly jurists and farmers. He held a bachelor's degree in law (1948) and a PhD in political science and economics (1956), both of which he received from the University of Complutense in Madrid.

== Career ==
Fuentes taught economics at different universities, namely the University of Valladolid (1956 – 1958), the Complutense University of Madrid (1958 – 1978) and at the National University of Distance Education (UNED; 1978 – 1990). He was one of the economists credited with the success of Spanish economy in the 1960s. He served as the head of the research department at the Ministry of Finance. He was also the editor of a reformist monthly magazine, Información Comercial Española. In 1969, he became the director of the Institute for Fiscal Studies. He served as the president of the Bank of Spain.

Fuentes was appointed deputy prime minister for economy to the cabinet led by Prime Minister Adolfo Suárez in 1977. Fuentes developed a rationalization program in 1977 which constituted the basis for Spain to have an opportunity to be granted EEC membership. He was in office until 22 February 1978, when he resigned from office due to his marginalisation in the cabinet. Fuentes tried to follow the promises of the structural reforms in economy which were included in the Moncloa Pacts. These reforms were required to reduce the production of steel and to nationalize the production of electricity, among others. However, Fuentes's initiatives were not backed by conservatives supporting the cabinet, leading to his resignation. Fernando Abril Martorell succeeded him as deputy prime minister. Fuentes's resignation was one of the reasons for the cabinet to adopt much more right-wing policies. After leaving office Fuentes returned to teaching post and became emeritus professor at UNED.

In 1989 Fuentes was awarded the Asturias Award for social sciences.

== Death ==
Fuentes died of Alzheimer's disease at the age of 82 in Madrid on 6 June 2007.
