= Nadia Calviño =

President of the European Investment Bank

The Most Excellent Nadia Calviño
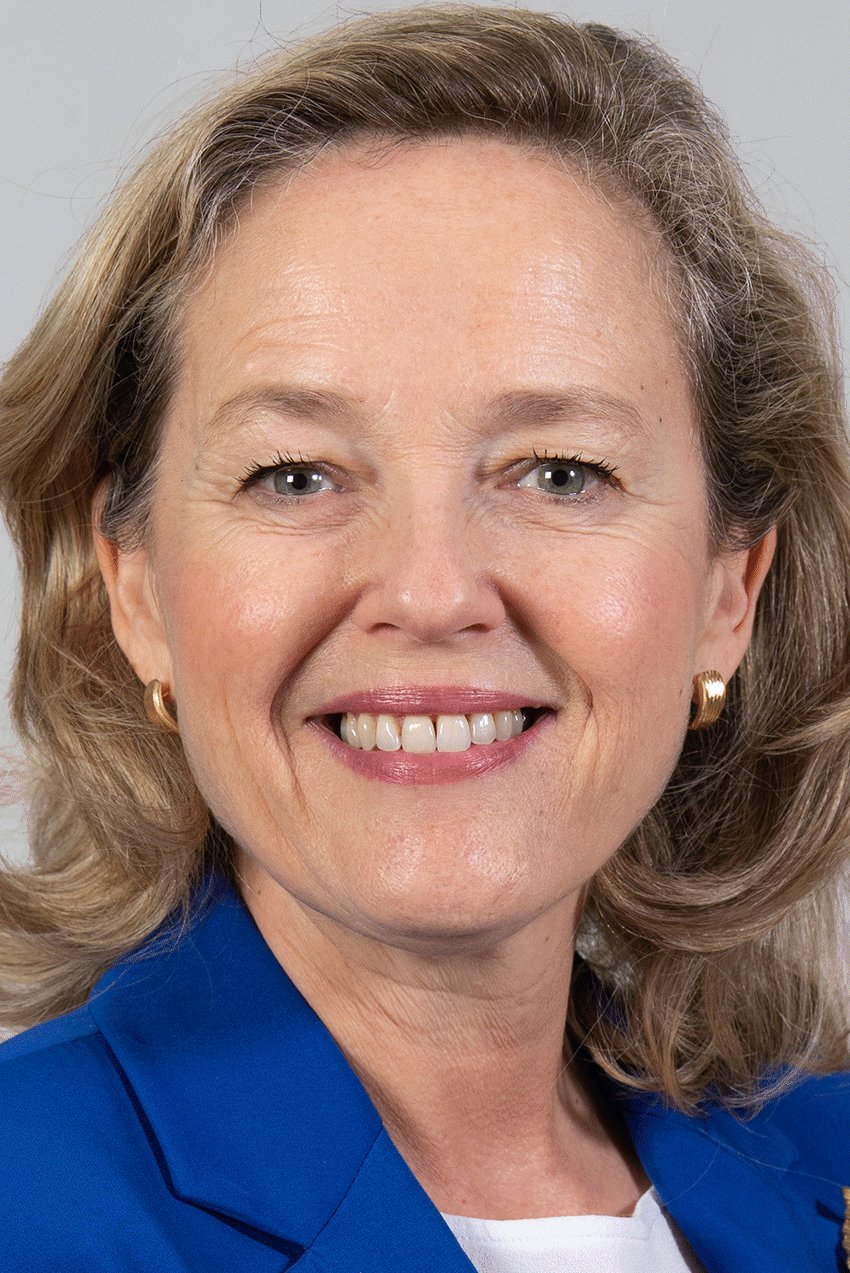
- Official portrait, 2023

President of the European Investment Bank
- Incumbent
- Assumed office 1 January 2024
- Preceded by: Werner Hoyer

First Deputy Prime Minister of Spain
- In office 12 July 2021 – 29 December 2023 Serving with Yolanda Díaz, Teresa Ribera and María Jesús Montero
- Monarch: Felipe VI
- Prime Minister: Pedro Sánchez
- Preceded by: Carmen Calvo
- Succeeded by: María Jesús Montero

Chair of the International Monetary and Financial Committee
- In office 3 January 2022 – 4 January 2024
- Managing Director: Kristalina Georgieva
- Preceded by: Magdalena Andersson
- Succeeded by: Mohammed Al-Jadaan

Second Deputy Prime Minister of Spain
- In office 31 March 2021 – 12 July 2021 Serving with Carmen Calvo, Yolanda Díaz and Teresa Ribera
- Monarch: Felipe VI
- Prime Minister: Pedro Sánchez
- Preceded by: Pablo Iglesias Turrión
- Succeeded by: Yolanda Díaz

Third Deputy Prime Minister of Spain
- In office 13 January 2020 – 31 March 2021 Serving with Carmen Calvo, Pablo Iglesias and Teresa Ribera
- Monarch: Felipe VI
- Prime Minister: Pedro Sánchez
- Preceded by: Manuel Chaves
- Succeeded by: Yolanda Díaz

Minister of Economy of Spain (Note: Minister of Economy and Enterprise from 2018 to 2020, Minister of Economic Affairs and Digital Transformation from 2020 to 2023 and again Minister of Economy, Trade and Enterprise from November to December 2023.)
- In office 7 June 2018 – 29 December 2023
- Prime Minister: Pedro Sánchez
- Preceded by: Román Escolano
- Succeeded by: Carlos Cuerpo (Economy, Trade and Business); José Luis Escrivá (Digital Transformation)

Director-General of the European Commission for Budget
- In office 5 May 2014 – 7 June 2018
- Preceded by: Hervé Jouanjean
- Succeeded by: Silvano Presa

Personal details
- Born: 3 October 1968 (age 58) A Coruña, Spain
- Party: Independent
- Spouse: Ignacio Manrique de Lara
- Children: 4
- Education: Complutense University (BA Economics); National University of Distance Education (BA Law)

Nadia María Calviño Santamaría (Spanish: [ˈnaðja kalˈβiɲo]; born 3 October 1968) is a Spanish economist and civil servant serving as the President of the European Investment Bank since January 2024.

From June 2018 to December 2023, Calviño was part of the cabinets led by prime minister Pedro Sánchez, holding the office of Minister of Economy. During her tenure, the portfolio was renamed three times: Economy and Business from 2018 to 2020, Economic Affairs and Digital Transformation from 2020 to 2023 and Economy, Trade and Business in the last period—. Since 2020 she was also Deputy Prime Minister of Spain, first as Third Deputy Prime Minister (January 2020 to March 2021), later as Second (March–July 2021) and finally, First Deputy Prime Minister (July 2021 to December 2023).

Calviño started her career in different positions within the Ministry of Economy and in 2006 took up a post at the European Commission. She worked in several directorates-general and in 2014 was appointed Director-General for Budget (DG BUDG). She held this post until June 2018, when prime minister Pedro Sánchez offered her a cabinet position.

== Early life and education ==
Nadia María Calviño Santamaría was born in A Coruña, Galicia, Spain on 3 October 1968. Her father, José María Calviño, was a former director general of the Radio Televisión Española (RTVE). She graduated with a degree in economics in 1991 from the Complutense University of Madrid and a law degree in 2001 from the National University of Distance Education (UNED).

== Career ==
Calviño is a member of the Senior Corps of State Economists and Trade Advisors. In the Spanish administration, she served as general director of the National Competition Commission.

After more than a decade working in the Spanish Ministry of Economy, Calviño moved to the European Commission in 2006. There she held the posts of Deputy Director-General attached to the Directorate-General for Competition (DG COMP) and Deputy Director-General in the Directorate-General for Internal Market, Industry, Entrepreneurship and SMEs (DG MARKT), as well as Deputy Director-General in the Directorate-General for Financial Stability, Financial Services and Capital Markets Union.

From 2014 to 2018 Calviño served as Director-General for Budget, under the leadership of European Commissioner Günther Oettinger. She has also worked as a professor at the Complutense University.

=== Minister of Economy of Spain ===
In June 2018 Calviño was chosen by Prime Minister Pedro Sánchez to be part of his new government as Minister of Economy and Business of Spain, following the motion of censure that the PSOE presented against the previous government of Mariano Rajoy (PP) and that was approved by the Congress of Deputies on 1 June 2018. Thus, on 7 June she took office as Minister of Economy and Business before the King at Palace of Zarzuela.

Following the resignation of Christine Lagarde as managing director of the International Monetary Fund (IMF) in 2019, Calviño was one of the candidates considered by European governments as potential successor; she withdrew after a first round of voting among representatives of the EU's 28 member states and the post went to Kristalina Georgieva instead.

=== Deputy prime minister ===
During the electoral debate of 5 November 2019, Pedro Sánchez announced that Calviño would be appointed economic vice-president if he were elected president, office she assumed as third deputy prime minister and Minister of Economic Affairs and Digital Transformation on 13 January 2020 before the King. On 31 March 2021, she was promoted to Second Deputy Prime Minister and on 12 July 2021 to First Deputy Prime Minister.

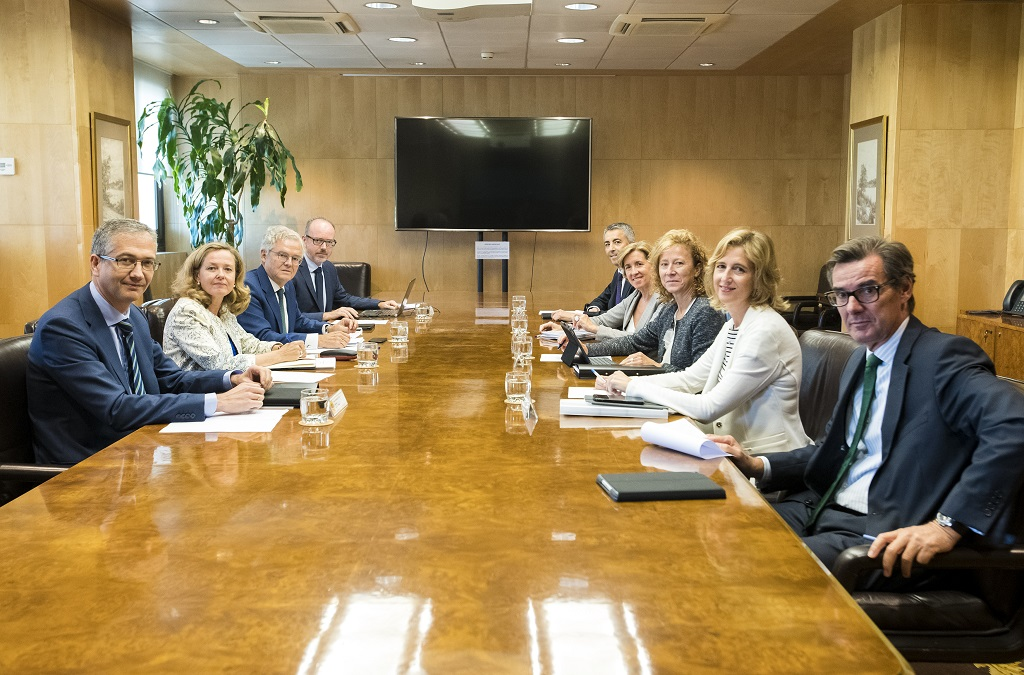
Calviño (left) presiding over a meeting of the Spanish Macroprudential Authority in 2019

In this new stage, Calviño's powers on new technologies and digital transformation expanded, creating in her department new positions related to this affairs, such as the Secretary of State for Digitization and Artificial Intelligence.

==== COVID-19 ====
In early 2020, the COVID-19 pandemic expanded to Europe, reaching Spain in late January. In March, Calviño announced a 200-billion-euro package to fight the economic effects of coronavirus, which included loans and guarantees to self-employed and to small and medium-sized entreprises and large companies.

Although Calviño initially opted for Eurobonds, due to the reluctance of some European countries, she adopted a more pragmatic position and she proposed to use the European Stability Mechanism but without conditions, an option accepted by the European Council which allowed the unlocking of €500 billion funds to the most affected European states. However, Calviño stated that neither she nor the government renounced Eurobonds and that they will continue to work on them in the medium term.

In mid-April, Calviño proposed to its European counterparts a 1.5 trillion euro recovery fund, that would be financed through perpetual debt issued by the European institutions.

==== Eurogroup candidacy ====
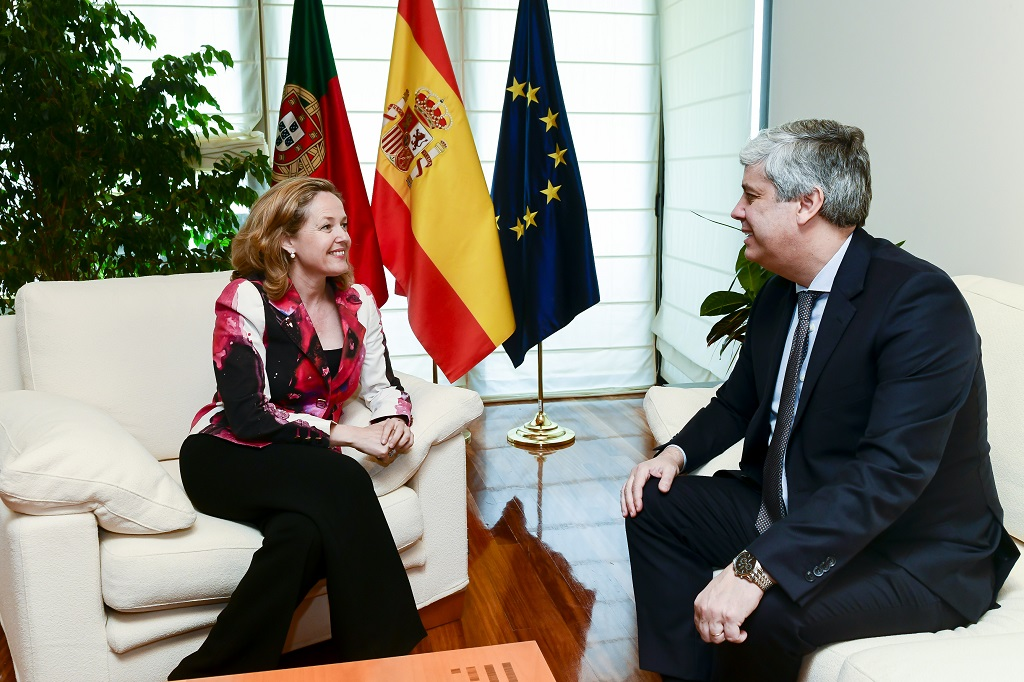
Calviño and Eurogroup president, Mário Centeno, in a meeting in 2019

In mid-June 2020, rumors increased about a possible candidacy of Calviño to be the next president of Eurogroup. Spanish Prime Minister declared that Spain would be "very interested" on it. The Spanish government officially proposed Calviño on 25 June. Calviño quickly received the support of the majority of the opposition in the Spanish Parliament.

The first European government to show support to Calviño's candidature was the German government through its chancellor, Angela Merkel, who stated that "It is no secret that there is support for Nadia Calviño's candidature in the German government." She also added that she was "pleased when women get leading political roles, and the Eurogroup has never been headed by a woman." On 28 June Portuguese PM António Costa also supported Calviño. On 8 July Italian Prime Minister Giuseppe Conte publicly supported her. A day later, French finance minister Bruno Le Maire did the same.

Voting took place on 9 July. As no candidate obtained an absolute majority in the first round, Calviño and Donohoe (with 9 and 5 votes, respectively) went to the second round after the withdrawal of Pierre Gramegna. In the second round Donohoe won the support of the majority of finance ministers, becoming Eurogroup president (10 votes to 9).

==== Bank consolidation ====
In early September 2020, state-controlled bank Bankia and Caixabank announced that they were very close to a deal to merge both banks. That merge would have created the biggest domestic bank in Spain, surpassing Santander and BBVA. Unidas Podemos, the coalition partner of the second Sánchez government and its leader, Second Deputy Prime Minister Pablo Iglesias rejected the merger describing it as a "privatization" and criticized that Calviño never revealed to them the existence of this talks.

Calviño, whose signature was more than enough to authorize the merger, received the support of the prime minister, Pedro Sánchez, who described the merger as something "positive" for the Spanish economy and the "territorial cohesion" since the bank would extend its influence from two to four Spanish regions. Days later, Calviño described the banking consolidation as "probably inevitable" to keep the solvency and competitiveness of the banking sector in the future, but at the same time she warned that this type of operations should be carried out respecting competition and the interests of consumers and that the CNMC would be watching. On 17 September 2020 the boards of both banks approved the merger. The new bank, which maintains the Caixabank brand, has the Spanish government as the second largest shareholder, with 16.1% of the shares. In December 2020, Calviño defended before the Congressional Economic Affairs Committee that the merger was the best option for the "social interest" since it is the one that contributes the greatest value to investors, including the State, one of the main shareholders.

Apart from this merger, other mergers were negotiated that same year. On the one hand, BBVA and Sabadell broke off negotiations in November 2020 due to the impossibility of reaching an agreement. On the other hand, other minor banks such as Unicaja and Liberbank reached an agreement in December 2020 to create the fifth bank in the country. In March 2021, both banks approved the merger.

==== IMFC Chair ====
On 7 December 2021, Calviño was proposed by the Eurogroup as the European candidate for the Presidency of the International Monetary and Financial Committee (IMFC), a position compatible with her post as minister of the Spanish government. She was elected for the post on 24 December.

=== President of the European Investment Bank ===
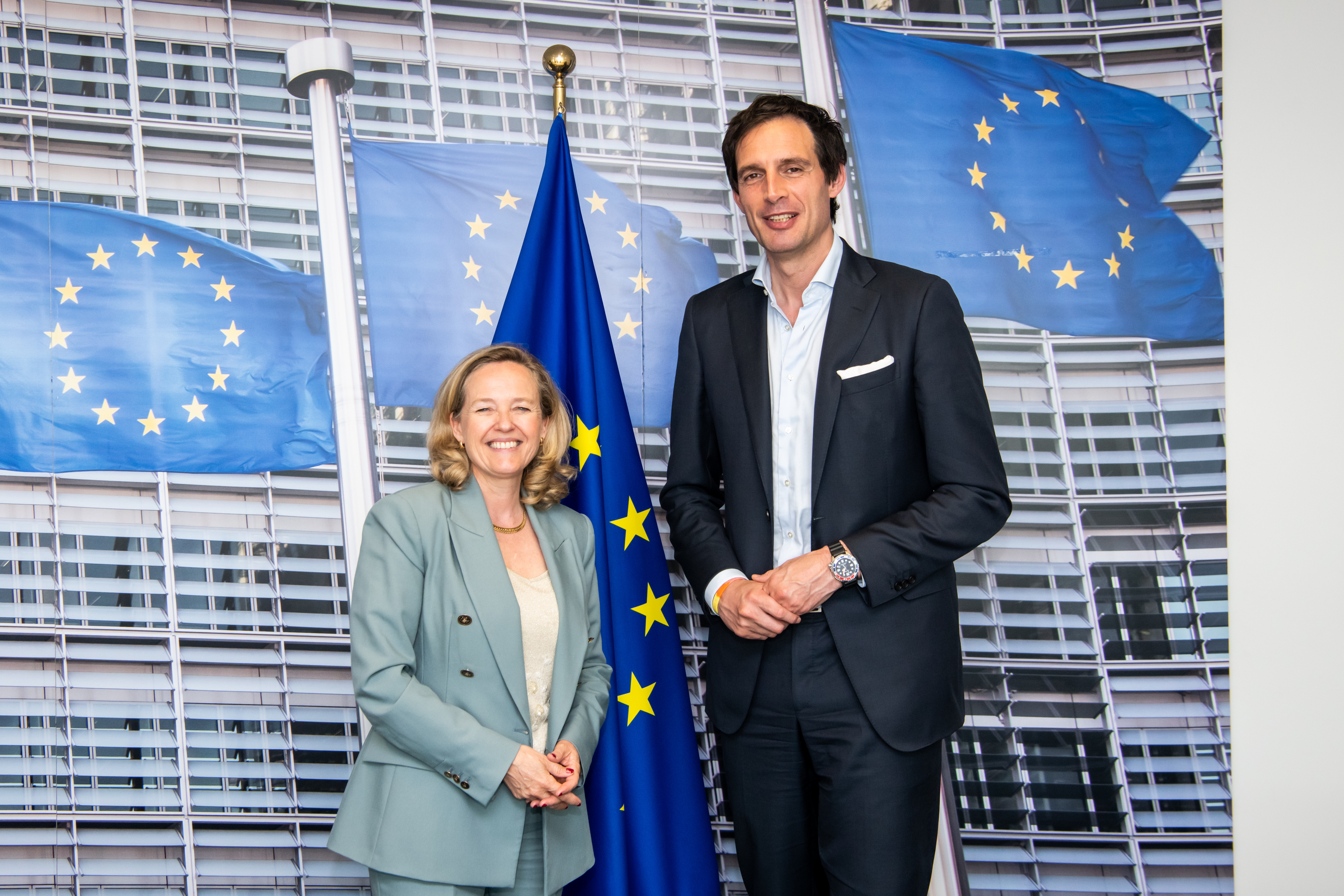
Calviño, as President of the European Investment Bank, with Wopke Hoekstra during a visit to the European Commission in Brussels in 2024

In August 2023, the Spanish government nominated Calviño as Spain's candidate to succeed Werner Hoyer as president of the European Investment Bank. After gathering relevant and public support from the German —one of the biggest shareholders— and Belgian —chair of the EIB’s Board of Governors at the moment— governments, the Economic and Financial Affairs Council agreed to her presidency in early December 2023.

In March 2024, the Prime Minister of Finland, Petteri Orpo, led 13 other nations-Bulgaria, Denmark, Estonia, France, Germany, Italy, Latvia, Lithuania, the Netherlands, Poland, the Czech Republic, Romania, and Sweden-in penning a letter to Calviño, Charles Michel and Alexander de Croo, in which they called for an urgent re-evaluation of EIB policy on defense-related investments in light of the 400-day old Russian invasion of Ukraine. Specifically they mentioned "the list of excluded activities.. and other restrictive elements.. A credible defence industry in turn requires investments." In January 2025, Calviño announced that the EIB would sponsor 2 billion euros of defence-related loans in 2025. Nevertheless, a few days later Orpo led again a new petition signed this time by 19 countries demanding "to go a step further so that the EIB can provide financing to projects exclusively intended for defense." The 19 heads of government once more cried out for a change to the list of activities excluded from EIB financing, in order for the EIB to accept funding proposals for military applications.

== Other activities ==
=== European Union organizations ===
- European Investment Bank (EIB), Ex-Officio Member of the Board of Governors (2018–2023)
- European Stability Mechanism (ESM), Member of the Board of Governors (2018–2023)

=== International organizations ===
- Asian Infrastructure Investment Bank (AIIB), Ex-Officio Member of the Board of Governors (2018–2023)
- Central American Bank for Economic Integration (CABEI), Ex-Officio Member of the Board of Governors (2018–2023)
- European Bank for Reconstruction and Development (EBRD), Ex-Officio Member of the Board of Governors (2018–2023)
- Inter-American Investment Corporation (IIC), Ex-Officio Member of the Board of Governors (2018–2023)
- International Monetary Fund (IMF), Ex-Officio Member of the Board of Governors (2018–2023)
- Joint World Bank-IMF Development Committee, Member
- Multilateral Investment Guarantee Agency (MIGA), World Bank Group, Ex-Officio Member of the Board of Governors (2018–2023)
- World Bank, Ex-Officio Member of the Board of Governors (2018–2023)

=== Non-governmental organizations ===
- Elcano Royal Institute for International and Strategic Studies, Member of the Board of Trustees

== Personal life ==
Calviño is mother to four children. Among her hobbies are 1950s cinema and cooking. She speaks Spanish, Galician, English, French and German.

== See also ==
- List of Complutense University of Madrid alumni

== Notes ==
Political offices
Preceded by Hervé Jouanjean	Director-General of the European Commission for Budget; 2014–2018	Succeeded by Silvano Presa; Acting
Preceded by Román Escolano	Minister of Economy, Trade and Business; 2018–2023	Succeeded by Carlos Cuerpo
