= Climate Change and Energy Transition Act =

Cortes Generales
- Long title: Law 7/2021, of 20 May, on climate change and energy transition
- Territorial extent: Spain
- Royal assent: 20 May 2021
- Effective: 22 May 2021
- Status: In force

The Climate Change and Energy Transition Act, officially Law 7/2021, of 20 May, on climate change and energy transition (in Spanish: Ley 7/2021, de 20 de mayo, de cambio climático y transición energética) is a Spanish law which received royal assent on 20 May 2021, and came into force on 22 May 2021. Its aim is to ensure Spain's compliance with the goals of the Paris Agreement. The law was passed by both chambers of the Cortes Generales (Spain's parliament) and enacted by King Felipe VI.

== Main provisions ==
Some of the measures contemplated in this law are:

- It is prohibited to grant new exploration authorisations, research permits and hydrocarbon exploitation concessions throughout the national territory. Nor will new permits be granted for resources extracted for their radioactive, fissionable or fertile properties, such as uranium. In addition, new authorisations for coal production projects at national level will be banned, and (hydraulic fracturing) will come to an end.
- By 2040 at the latest, all new cars must be zero-emission. This means that from that year onwards, no new passenger cars and light commercial vehicles (not intended for commercial use) emitting CO_{2}, the main greenhouse gas contributing to global warming, may be sold. The aim is to have a fleet of passenger cars and light commercial vehicles with no direct CO_{2} emissions by 2050.
- Municipalities with more than 50,000 inhabitants are obliged to establish low-emission zones, in the style of Madrid Central, to reduce air pollution. There are 149 towns and cities with more than 25 million people.
- Petrol stations are obliged to install charging points for electric cars. From 2023, all non-residential buildings with more than 20 parking spaces must have charging infrastructure.

== Approval ==
The law was initially approved by the Congress of Deputies on 8 April 2021 and was sent to the Senate for its final approval. The Senate approved the law on 28 April 2021 with some amendments.

On 13 May 2021, the Congress of Deputies made a final vote on the text. The law was approved by the absolute majority of the chamber, with the support of all the groups except Vox, which voted against, and PP and Más País-Verdes Equo, which abstained.

== Criticisms ==
Some experts in the field have criticised the lack of ambition of the law and its risk of being "born old". Greenpeace considers that the objectives are insufficient to fight decisively against the climate emergency.

== See also ==
- Climate of Spain
