= Noez =

Coordinates: 39°45′N 4°11′W

- municipality
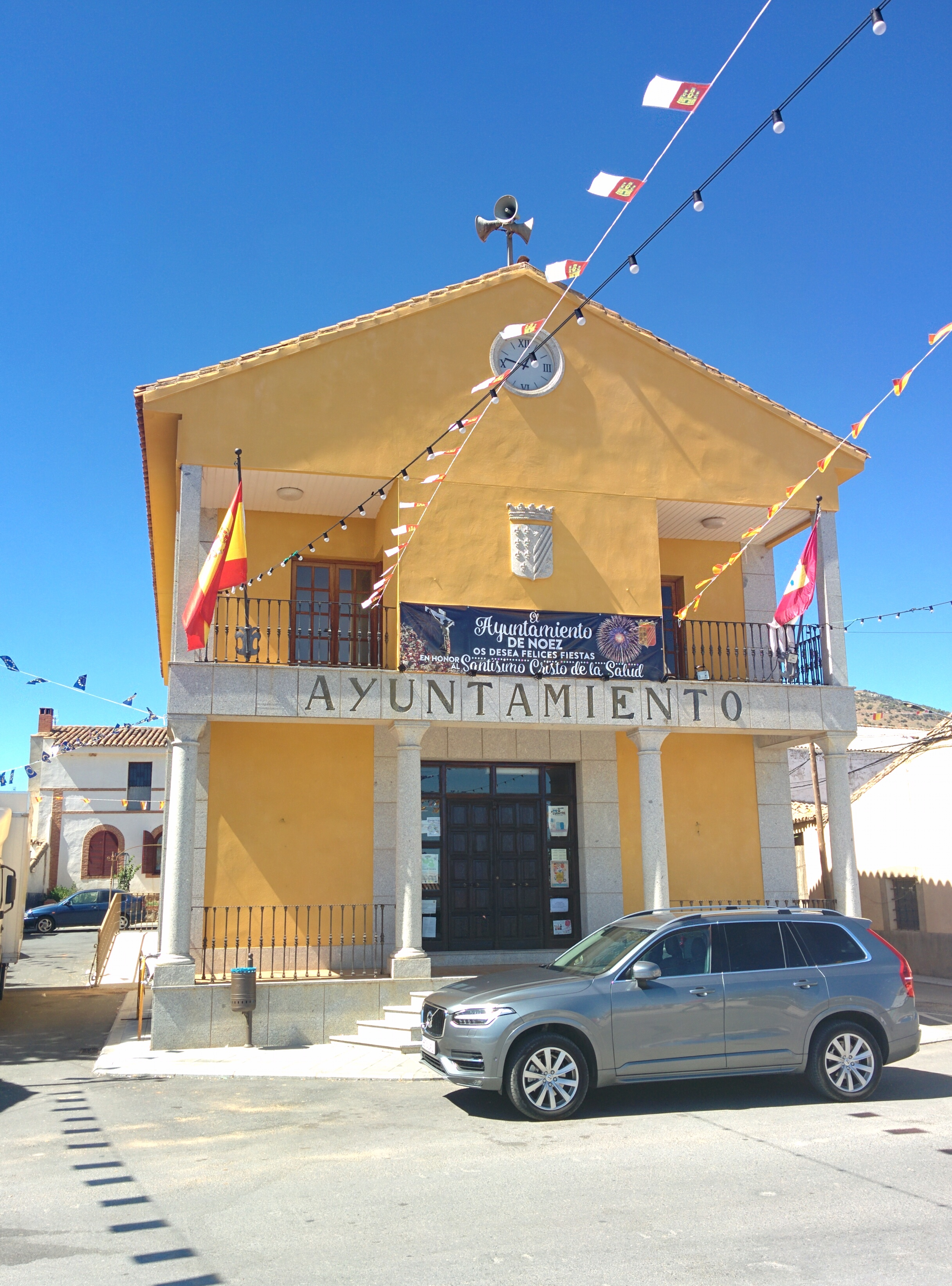
- Town Hall of Noez

- Coat of arms
- Interactive map of Noez
- Country: Spain
- Autonomous community: Castile-La Mancha
- Province: Toledo
- Municipality: Noez

Area
  - Total: 34 km^{2} (13 sq mi)
- Elevation: 763 m (2,503 ft)

Population (2025-01-01)
  - Total: 1,058
  - Density: 31/km^{2} (81/sq mi)
- Time zone: UTC+1 (CET)
  - Summer (DST): UTC+2 (CEST)

Noez is a municipality located in the province of Toledo, Castile-La Mancha, Spain. According to the 2006 census (INE), the municipality has a population of 806 inhabitants.
