= Juan-Miguel Villar Mir =

Spanish businessman and politician (1931–2024)

Juan Miguel Villar Mir
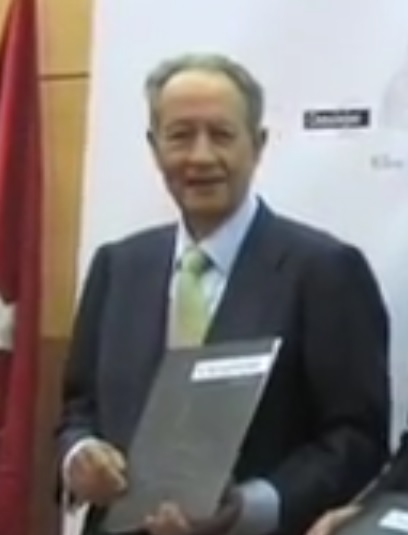
- Villar Mir in 2013
- Born: 30 September 1931; Madrid, Spain
- Died: 6 July 2024 (aged 92); Madrid, Spain
- Title: Chairman and CEO, Obrascón Huarte Lain
- Board member of: Santander
- Spouse: Married
- Children: 3

Juan-Miguel Villar Mir, 1st Marquess of Villar Mir (30 September 1931 – 6 July 2024) was a Spanish billionaire businessman, politician, and the chairman and CEO of the construction company Obrascón Huarte Lain.

== Early life ==
Villar Mir was born in Madrid on 30 September 1931. He earned a degree in industrial organisation, and a doctorate in civil engineering.

== Career ==
From December 1975 to July 1976, Villar Mir was the Minister of Economy and Finance. In 1976, he was Third Deputy Prime Minister of Spain for about six months, as a member of the Falange Española Tradicionalista y de las Juntas de Ofensiva Nacional Sindicalista party, under Prime Minister Carlos Arias Navarro.

Obrascón Huarte Lain fell into financial difficulties in the late 1980s, however, and was bought from bankruptcy for one penny in 1987 by Villar Mir, who remained the company's chairman until his death. Villar Mir turned around the firm's fortunes, and it listed on the Bolsa de Madrid in 1991.

Villar Mir had been a non-executive director of Santander from 2013.

== Personal life and death ==
Villar Mir was married with three children and lived in Madrid, Spain. He died in Madrid on 6 July 2024, at the age of 92.
