= Recover Madrid =

Political party in Madrid, Spain

Recover Madrid Recupera Madrid
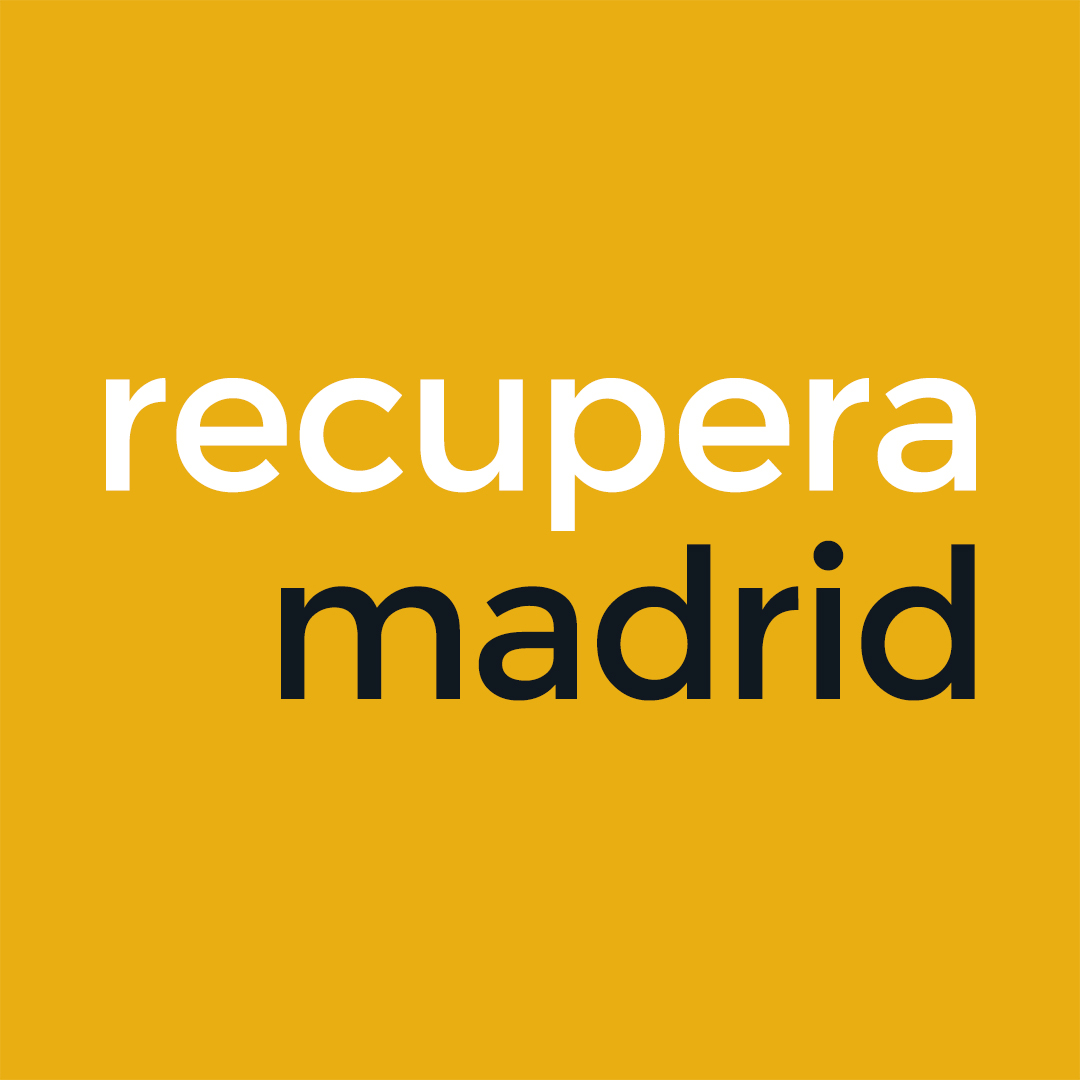
- Abbreviation: PM-RM
- Leader: Luis Cueto
- Founded: 2021
- Split from: Más Madrid
- Headquarters: Madrid, Spain
- Ideology: Technocracy
- Political position: Left wing
- Colors: Yellow and blue
- City Council of Madrid: 0 / 57

Website
- recuperamadrid.info

Recover Madrid (Spanish: Recupera Madrid) is a political party in Madrid, Spain. It began in March 2021, when four members of the City Council of Madrid left Más Madrid and formed a mixed group. The mixed group was dissolved by court order in May 2022, on Más Madrid's complaint. Two councillors left Recover Madrid before the 2023 Madrid City Council election, in which it presented a list comprising professionals from each council area. After a controversy over validation of signatures, it changed its constitution from a grouping of electors to a political party. It did not win any seats in that election.

== History ==
=== Foundation ===
On 4 March 2021, four members of the City Council of Madrid elected as members of Más Madrid quit the party. All four – Marta Higueras, José Manuel Calvo, Felipe Llamas and Luis Cueto – were close to former Mayor of Madrid, Manuela Carmena. The four criticised the Más Madrid leader in the council, Rita Maestre, whom they accused of abandoning progressive policies, and believed that Más Madrid's failure to establish a joint list with Unidas Podemos in the 2019 Madrid City Council election cost Carmena's office as mayor at the expense of José Luis Martínez-Almeida of the People's Party (PP). By the end of the month, the four were permitted to form a mixed group in the city council, the first such occurrence in its history.

In December 2021, Llamas resigned from the city council in disagreement with the mixed group's votes in favour of passing the budget proposed by Almeida. His resignation allowed Más Madrid to be allotted a replacement, making them the largest individual party in the council again.

In May 2022, Más Madrid won a court case to dissolve the mixed group in the city council and make the three councillors sit as independents. The argument was that Más Madrid contested the 2019 elections as a single registered political party, not as a coalition as argued by the council. Shortly after the verdict, Recover Madrid took Más Madrid to court for alleged illegal funding.

=== 2023 Madrid election ===
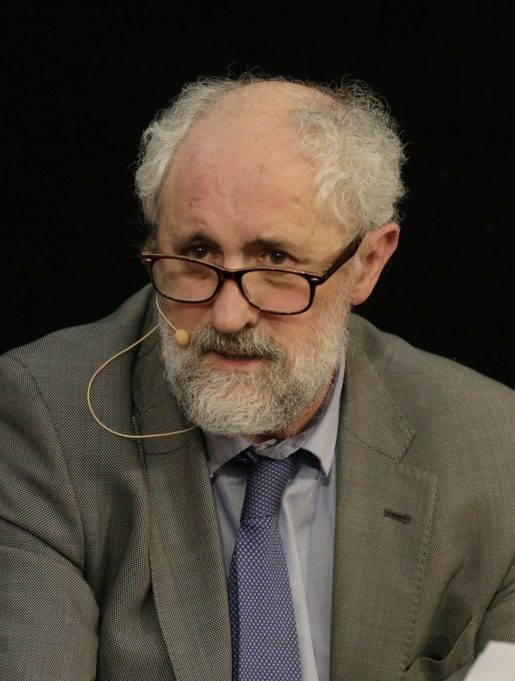
Luis Cueto led Recover Madrid's list in the 2023 Madrid City Council election

In September 2022, Higueras announced that she would not take part in Recover Madrid's campaign for the 2023 Madrid City Council election due to ideological disagreements with Calvo and Cueto, including on whether Recover Madrid should contest elections at all. The following January, Recover Madrid presented its list for the election in which it would run as a grouping of electors. The list, led by Cueto, included a qualified professional in each of the sectors for which the council is responsible. Recover Madrid posted a LinkedIn listing for its candidate for treasurer in the City Council, a job potentially worth over €100,000. The grouping has been considered technocratic by sources.

In March 2023, the City Council refused to validate the 8,000 signatures collected by Recover Madrid to run for election, unless there was a photocopy of the identity card of every signature – a requirement that is not asked for political parties. The Spanish Ombudsman, Ángel Gabilondo, upheld Recover Madrid's appeal and requested for alternative forms of verification to be found. On 28 April, with the controversy unresolved, Recover Madrid declared that it would run as a political party.

Recover Madrid received 6,436 votes in the election (0.39%), coming eighth overall and losing its seats. It received fewer votes than the signatures it had submitted to run in the elections.
