= 2023 Madrid municipal election =

Election in the Spanish municipality of Madrid

- 28 May 2023

All 57 seats in the City Council of Madrid 29 seats needed for a majority
- Opinion polls
- Registered: 2,386,293 ▼0.5%
- Turnout: 1,651,560 (69.2%) ▲1.0 pp
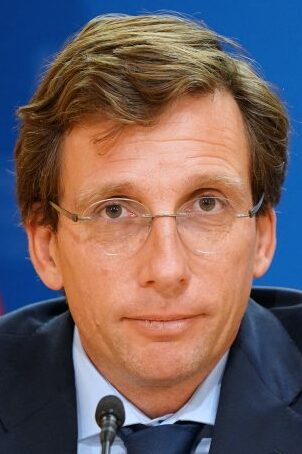

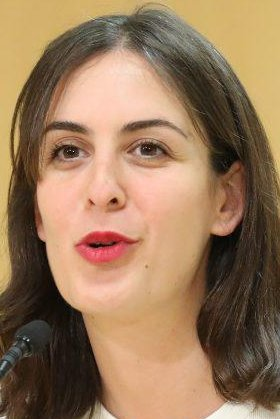

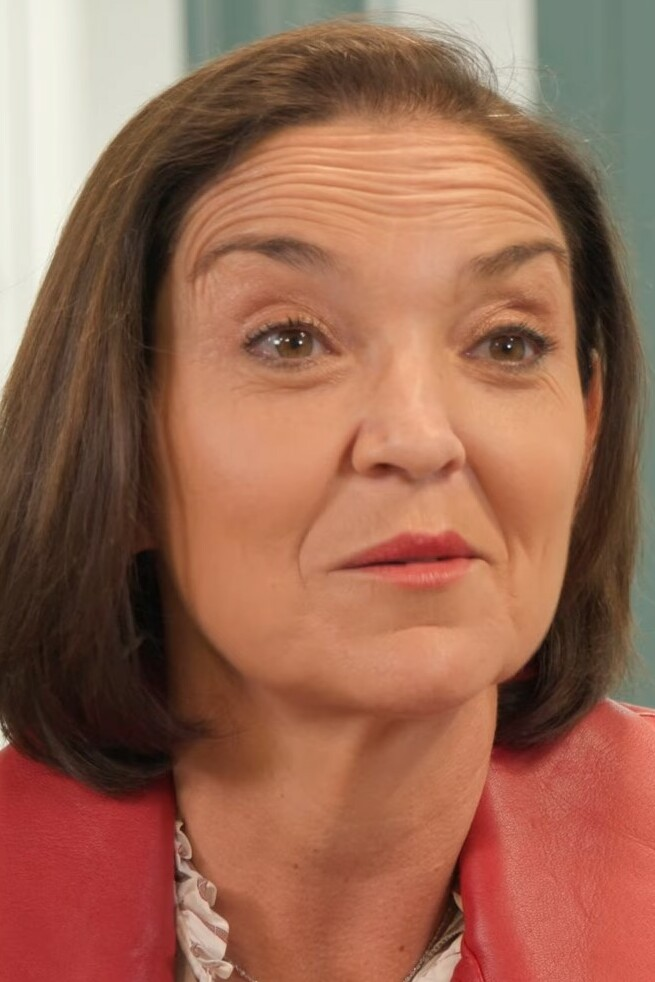

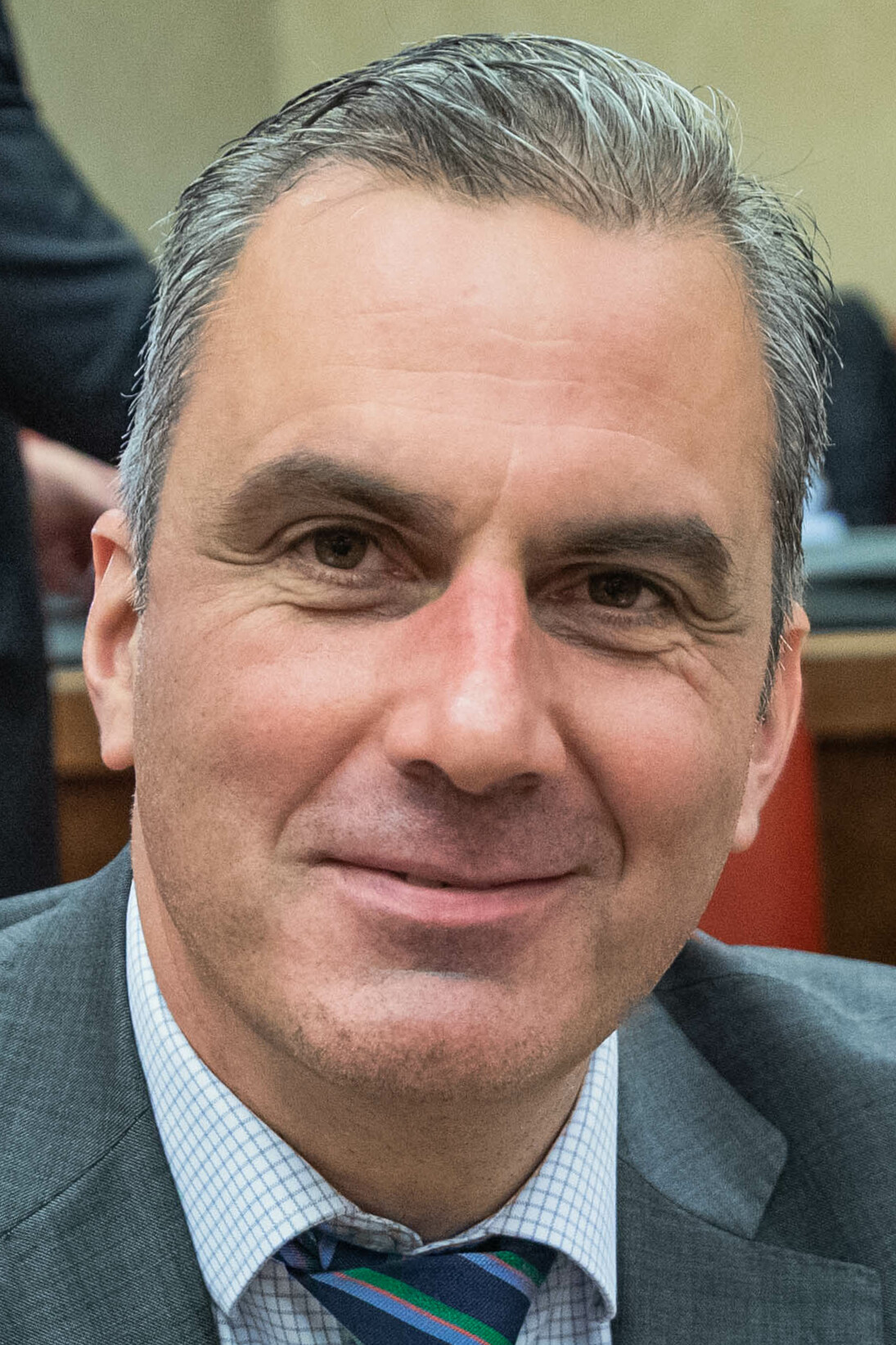

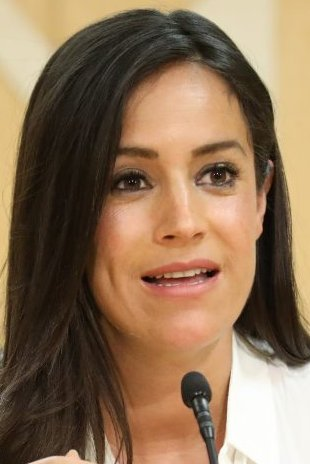
	First party	Second party	Third party
Leader	José Luis Martínez-Almeida	Rita Maestre	Reyes Maroto
Party	PP	MM–VQ	PSOE
Leader since	28 April 2017	30 July 2020	30 November 2022
Last election	15 seats, 24.3%	19 seats, 31.0%	8 seats, 13.7%
Seats won	29	12	11
Seat change	▲14	▼7	▲3
Popular vote	729,304	313,712	274,786
Percentage	44.5%	19.1%	16.8%
Swing	▲20.2 pp	▼11.9 pp	▲3.1 pp
	Fourth party	Fifth party
Leader	Javier Ortega Smith	Begoña Villacís
Party	Vox	CS
Leader since	18 April 2019	2 March 2015
Last election	4 seats, 7.7%	11 seats, 19.2%
Seats won	5	0
Seat change	▲1	▼11
Popular vote	148,994	47,429
Percentage	9.1%	2.9%
Swing	▲1.4 pp	▼16.3 pp
Mayor before election
José Luis Martínez-Almeida
PP
Mayor after election
José Luis Martínez-Almeida
PP

A municipal election was held in Madrid on 28 May 2023 to elect the 12th City Council of the municipality. All 57 seats in the City Council were up for election. It was held concurrently with regional elections in twelve autonomous communities and local elections all across Spain.

== Overview ==
Under the 1978 Constitution, the governance of municipalities in Spain—part of the country's local government system—was centered on the figure of city councils (Spanish: ayuntamientos), local corporations with independent legal personality composed of a mayor, a government council and an elected legislative assembly. The mayor was indirectly elected by the local assembly, requiring an absolute majority; otherwise, the candidate from the most-voted party automatically became mayor (ties were resolved by drawing lots). In the case of Madrid, the top-tier administrative and governing body was the City Council of Madrid.

=== Date ===
The term of local assemblies in Spain expired four years after the date of their previous election, with election day being fixed for the fourth Sunday of May every four years. The election decree was required to be issued no later than 54 days before the scheduled election date and published on the following day in the Official State Gazette (BOE). The previous local elections were held on 26 May 2019, setting the date for election day on the fourth Sunday of May four years later, which was 28 May 2023.

Local assemblies could not be dissolved before the expiration of their term, except in cases of mismanagement that seriously harmed the public interest and implied a breach of constitutional obligations, in which case the Council of Ministers could—optionally—decide to call a by-election.

Elections to the assemblies of local entities were officially called on 4 April 2023 with the publication of the corresponding decree in the BOE, setting election day for 28 May.

=== Electoral system ===
Voting for local assemblies was based on universal suffrage, comprising all Spanish nationals over 18 years of age, registered and residing in the municipality and with full political rights (provided that they had not been deprived of the right to vote by a final sentence), as well as resident non-national European citizens, and those whose country of origin allowed reciprocal voting by virtue of a treaty.

Local councillors were elected using the D'Hondt method and closed-list proportional voting, with a five percent-threshold of valid votes (including blank ballots) in each municipality. Each municipality was a multi-member constituency, with a number of seats based on the following scale:

Population	Councillors
<100	3
101–250	5
251–1,000	7
1,001–2,000	9
2,001–5,000	11
5,001–10,000	13
10,001–20,000	17
20,001–50,000	21
50,001–100,000	25
>100,001	+1 per each 100,000 inhabitants or fraction +1 if total is an even number

The law did not provide for by-elections to fill vacant seats; instead, any vacancies arising after the proclamation of candidates and during the legislative term were filled by the next candidates on the party lists or, when required, by designated substitutes.

=== Outgoing council ===
The table below shows the composition of the political groups in the local assembly at the time of the election call.

Council composition in April 2023
Groups	Parties	Councillors	
Groups	Parties	Seats	Total
More Madrid Municipal Group	Más Madrid	16	16
People's Party's Municipal Group	PP	15	15
Citizens–Party of the Citizenry Municipal Group	CS	11	11
Socialist Municipal Group in Madrid	PSOE	8	8
Vox Municipal Group	Vox	4	4
Mixed Group	RM	2 (Note: José Manuel Calvo and Luis Cueto, former Más Madrid councillors.)	3
Mixed Group	INDEP	1 (Note: Marta Higueras, former Más Madrid councillor.)	3

== Parties and candidates ==
The electoral law allowed for parties and federations registered in the interior ministry, alliances and groupings of electors to present lists of candidates. Parties and federations intending to form an alliance were required to inform the relevant electoral commission within 10 days of the election call, whereas groupings of electors needed to secure the signature of a determined amount of the electors registered in the municipality for which they sought election, disallowing electors from signing for more than one list. In the case of Madrid, as its population was over 1,000,001, at least 8,000 signatures were required. Additionally, a balanced composition of men and women was required in the electoral lists, so that candidates of either sex made up at least 40 percent of the total composition.

Below is a list of the main parties and alliances which contested the election:

Candidacy	Parties and alliances	Leading candidate	Ideology	Previous result		Gov.	Ref.
Candidacy	Parties and alliances	Leading candidate	Ideology	Vote %	Seats	Gov.	Ref.
MM–VQ	List: More Madrid (Más Madrid); Greens Equo (Verdes Equo)	Rita Maestre	Progressivism; Participatory democracy Green politics	31.0%	19	No	
PP	List: People's Party (PP)	José Luis Martínez-Almeida	Conservatism; Christian democracy	24.3%	15	Yes	
CS	List: Citizens–Party of the Citizenry (CS)	Begoña Villacís	Liberalism	19.2%	11	Yes	
PSOE	List: Spanish Socialist Workers' Party (PSOE)	Reyes Maroto	Social democracy	13.7%	8	No	
Vox	List: Vox (Vox)	Javier Ortega Smith	Right-wing populism Ultranationalism; National conservatism	7.7%	4	No	
Podemos– IU–AV	List: We Can (Podemos); United Left–Madrid (IU–M) – Communist Party of Madrid (PCM) – The Dawn Marxist Organization (La Aurora (OM)) – Republican Left (IR); Green Alliance (AV)	Roberto Sotomayor	Left-wing populism Direct democracy Democratic socialism	2.6% (Note: Results for IU–MpM in the 2019 election.)	0	No	

In March 2021, four Más Madrid city councillors, including former lieutenant mayor Marta Higueras, split into the Mixed Group to form "Recover Madrid" (Spanish: Recupera Madrid), a platform aiming at "preserving the original project" of former mayor Manuela Carmena under a more moderate and pragmatic line, draining material and economic resources from the Más Madrid group, and becoming involved in controversial choices—such as the approval of Mayor José Luis Martínez-Almeida's 2022 budget—which saw one of Recupera Madrid's councillors, Felipe Llamas, resigning from his post in disagreement. The platform announced its intention to run in the election, selecting Luis Cueto as their candidate.

On 12 September 2022, Podemos announced its intention to contest the 2023 Madrid municipal election after not having done in the 2019 election, with athlete Roberto Sotomayor as the party's candidate.

== Campaign ==
=== Party slogans ===
Party or alliance	Original slogan	English translation	Ref.
MM–VQ	« Lo va a hacer Rita »	"Rita will get it done" (Note: The slogan makes a reference to the Spanish proverb "Que lo haga Rita [la cantaora]" in reference to Rita Giménez)	
PP	« Momento Madrid »	"Madrid Momentum"	
CS	« Somos de Villa »	"We are of Villa" (Note: The slogan plays with the surname of the candidate, Villacís, as "Villa" is the title given to the city of Madrid.)	
PSOE	« Reyes de Madrid »	"Reyes of Madrid" (Note: The slogan plays with the name of the candidate, Reyes, meaning also "Monarchs" in Spanish.)	
Vox	« Cuida Madrid, cuida lo tuyo »	"Take care of Madrid, take care of your own"	
Podemos–IU	« Hay que arreglar Madrid corriendo »	"We must fix Madrid quickly" (Note: The slogan plays with the meaning of corriendo, which in English translates both as "quickly" and "by running", the later being a reference to the candidate's background as an athlete.)	

== Opinion polls ==
The tables below list opinion polling results in reverse chronological order, showing the most recent first and using the dates when the survey fieldwork was done, as opposed to the date of publication. Where the fieldwork dates are unknown, the date of publication is given instead. The highest percentage figure in each polling survey is displayed with its background shaded in the leading party's colour. If a tie ensues, this is applied to the figures with the highest percentages. The "Lead" column on the right shows the percentage-point difference between the parties with the highest percentages in a poll.

=== Graphical summary ===
Local regression trend line of poll results from 26 May 2019 to 28 May 2023, with each line corresponding to a political party.

=== Voting intention estimates ===
The table below lists weighted voting intention estimates. Refusals are generally excluded from the party vote percentages, while question wording and the treatment of "don't know" responses and those not intending to vote may vary between polling organisations. When available, seat projections determined by the polling organisations are displayed below (or in place of) the percentages in a smaller font; 29 seats were required for an absolute majority in the City Council of Madrid.

Color key:

Poll conducted after legal ban on opinion polls

Polling firm/Commissioner	Fieldwork date	Sample size	Turnout	Más Madrid	PP	CS	PSOE	Vox	IU–Madrid	Unidas Podemos	RM	Lead
2023 municipal election	28 May 2023	—N/a	69.2	19.1; 12	44.5; 29	2.9; 0	16.8; 11	9.1; 5	(Note: Within Unidas Podemos.)	4.9; 0	0.4; 0	25.4
GAD3/RTVE–FORTA	12–27 May 2023	?	?	19.0; 12	47.0; 28/30	2.0; 0	17.0; 10/11	7.0; 4		5.0; 0/3	–	28.0
KeyData/Público	22 May 2023	?	67.7	22.6; 15	40.5; 26	3.8; 0	17.3; 11	8.7; 5		4.5; 0	–	17.9
NC Report/La Razón	22 May 2023	?	?	24.8; 15	41.0; 26	–	17.1; 11	8.6; 5		–	–	16.2
Target Point/El Debate	15–19 May 2023	?	?	23.7; 14/16	40.1; 25/26	4.1; 0	15.1; 9/10	9.0; 5/6		5.0; 0/3	–	16.4
DYM/Henneo	15–18 May 2023	?	?	23.3; 14/15	41.0; 25/26	–	18.7; 11/12	8.2; 4/5		4.8; 0/3	–	17.7
40dB/Prisa	12–17 May 2023	800	?	19.5; 11/13	41.0; 25/27	5.4; 0/3	18.0; 11/12	8.0; 4/5		6.1; 0/3	–	21.5
Sigma Dos/El Mundo	11–16 May 2023	1,400	?	19.2; 11/12	41.9; 25/26	4.0; 0/3	18.8; 11/12	8.2; 5/6		5.8; 3	–	22.7
NC Report/La Razón	15 May 2023	1,000	?	24.1; 16	42.0; 26	2.5; 0	17.4; 11	8.1; 4		3.4; 0	–	17.9
Sigma Dos/Antena 3	14 May 2023	?	?	20.2; 12	41.2; 24/25	? 3	18.1; 10/11	? 4		? 3	–	21.0
SocioMétrica/El Español	8–14 May 2023	?	?	22.3; 14	41.0; 27	4.3; 0	17.5; 11	9.1; 5		4.4; 0	–	18.7
Data10/Okdiario	9–11 May 2023	1,500	?	21.9; 15	38.8; 25	4.5; 0	18.4; 11	10.3; 6		3.6; 0	–	16.9
Hamalgama Métrica/Vozpópuli	3–10 May 2023	?	?	23.1; 14	42.1; 27	2.7; 0	18.0; 11	8.4; 5		4.3; 0	–	19.0
PSOE	27 Apr 2023	?	?	? 14/15	? 24/25	? 0	? 14/15	? 3/4		? 0	–	?
CIS	10–26 Apr 2023	1,180	?	26.7; 13/18	38.0; 21/25	4.3; 0/3	16.0; 8/11	7.4; 4/5		4.5; 0/4	–	11.3
GAD3/ABC	11–12 Apr 2023	600	?	18.9; 12	44.7; 28/29	2.8; 0	19.3; 12	7.6; 4/5		4.2; 0	–	25.4
Sigma Dos/El Mundo	7–12 Apr 2023	577	?	23.9; 14/15	38.2; 22/23	6.2; 3	17.5; 10/11	7.1; 4		5.8; 3	–	14.3
IMOP/El Confidencial	21–24 Mar 2023	800	?	23.9; 14	38.3; 24	6.8; 4	17.0; 10	8.6; 5		3.6; 0	–	14.4
SocioMétrica/El Español	27 Feb–3 Mar 2023	800	?	27.3; 16/17	38.2; 23/24	4.6; 0/3	13.9; 8/9	10.1; 6/7		4.4; 0/2	–	10.9
Data10/Okdiario	9–17 Feb 2023	1,000	?	23.1; 15	37.9; 24	4.3; 0	18.6; 12	9.4; 6		4.1; 0	–	14.8
KeyData/Público	16 Feb 2023	?	67.7	24.9; 15	38.6; 24/25	5.1; 0/2	16.1; 9/10	8.7; 5		4.8; 0/2	–	13.7
GAD3/PP	4–10 Jan 2023	1,004	?	18.3; 11	45.1; 28	3.9; 0	17.2; 10/11	6.7; 4		6.4; 3/4	0.5; 0	26.8
Metroscopia/Cs	4 Dec 2022	1,000	?	? 14/15	? 27/28	4.8; 0/3	? 8	? 5/6		? 0	–	?
Data10/Okdiario	14 Nov 2022	1,000	?	27.5; 16	32.1; 19	7.6; 4	13.5; 8	11.4; 7		6.4; 3	–	4.6
Sigma Dos/El Mundo	25 Oct–3 Nov 2022	996	?	27.0; 16	37.9; 23	6.0; 3	18.3; 11	7.9; 4		–	–	10.9
40dB/MM	6–13 Oct 2022	?	?	28.5; 17	37.7; 22	6.2; 3	18.1; 11	7.5; 4		–	–	9.2
GAD3/PP	6–8 Jul 2022	1,003	?	16.6; 10	45.6; 28/30	2.6; 0	19.4; 12	7.9; 4/5		5.2; 0/3	0.8; 0	26.2
40dB/MM	30 Jun 2022	?	?	29.7; 18	37.1; 22	7.3; 4	15.1; 9	8.0; 4		–	–	7.4
NC Report/La Razón	6–12 May 2022	1,000	71.0	25.1; 15	41.6; 26	5.9; 3	12.5; 7	10.0; 6		–	–	16.5
Sigma Dos/El Mundo	9–11 May 2022	1,400	?	26.9; 16	35.3; 21	6.7; 4	15.1; 9	11.8; 7		–	–	8.4
SocioMétrica/El Español	26–29 Apr 2022	800	?	26.6; 16	40.2; 25	7.2; 4	11.2; 6	9.9; 6		–	–	13.6
Data10/Okdiario	19–20 Apr 2022	1,000	?	29.8; 18	31.2; 19	9.3; 5	12.2; 7	10.4; 5		5.8; 3	–	1.4
EM-Analytics/Electomanía	1 Mar–13 Apr 2022	845	?	33.3; 21	26.7; 16	10.3; 6	12.8; 8	10.6; 6		3.8; 0	1.1; 0	6.6
EM-Analytics/Electomanía	17–18 Feb 2022	876	?	31.3; 20	27.9; 17	9.3; 5	13.0; 8	11.7; 7		4.3; 0	1.1; 0	3.4
Sigma Dos/El Mundo	3–6 Nov 2021	622	?	25.1; 15	35.4; 22	8.4; 4	12.2; 7	6.9; 4		9.8; 5	–	10.3
2021 regional election	4 May 2021	—N/a	75.6	17.9 (11)	45.3 (28)	3.7 (0)	16.1 (9)	8.1 (5)		7.5 (4)	–	27.4
EM-Analytics/Electomanía	17 Mar 2021	1,000	?	14.3; 9	42.0; 26	2.1; 0	22.1; 14	9.2; 5		8.5; 5	–	19.9
ElectoPanel/Electomanía	1 Jul–25 Sep 2020	?	?	22.9; 14	35.5; 21	7.6; 4	23.4; 14	7.8; 4	1.1; 0	–	–	12.1
Sigma Dos/Telemadrid	19–22 Jun 2020	?	?	18.6; 11	38.5; 23	8.2; 4	21.6; 13	5.7; 3		5.1; 3	–	16.9
Hamalgama Métrica/Okdiario	8–11 May 2020	1,000	?	18.9; 11	34.5; 21	10.1; 6	17.3; 10	8.6; 5		7.9; 4	–	15.6
GAD3/ABC	24–29 Apr 2020	631	?	8.2; 5	44.7; 27	5.2; 3	25.9; 15	7.0; 4		6.2; 3	–	18.8
ElectoPanel/Electomanía	26–31 Mar 2020	800	?	16.9; 10	30.8; 19	10.7; 6	25.7; 15	12.0; 7	1.8; 0	–	–	5.1
November 2019 general election	10 Nov 2019	—N/a	74.0	6.3 (3)	27.3 (16)	8.9 (5)	26.4 (16)	16.0 (9)		13.0 (8)	–	0.9
ElectoPanel/Electomanía	10 Oct 2019	1,500	?	8.8; 5	25.6; 16	13.5; 8	25.5; 15	12.2; 7		10.9; 6	–	0.1
2019 municipal election	26 May 2019	—N/a	68.2	31.0; 19	24.3; 15	19.2; 11	13.7; 8	7.7; 4	2.6; 0	–	–	6.7

=== Voting preferences ===
The table below lists raw, unweighted voting preferences.

Polling firm/Commissioner	Fieldwork date	Sample size	Más Madrid	PP	CS	PSOE	Vox	IU–Madrid	Unidas Podemos	Question	X mark	Lead
2023 municipal election	28 May 2023	—N/a	13.1	30.6	2.0	11.5	6.2		3.4	—N/a	30.8	17.5
40dB/Prisa	12–17 May 2023	800	12.4	33.8	6.4	15.2	8.2		4.6	12.4	4.0	18.6
CIS	10–26 Apr 2023	1,180	16.7	30.3	1.7	12.5	5.7		4.8	23.1	2.0	13.6
2021 regional election (Note: Does not include non-resident citizens.)	4 May 2021	—N/a	13.5	34.1	2.8	12.1	6.1		5.6	—N/a	24.4	20.6
November 2019 general election	10 Nov 2019	—N/a	4.7	20.1	6.5	19.4	11.8		9.6	—N/a	26.0	0.7
2019 municipal election	26 May 2019	—N/a	21.1	16.5	13.0	9.3	5.2	1.8	–	—N/a	31.8	4.6

=== Preferred Mayor ===
The table below lists opinion polling on leader preferences to become mayor of Madrid.

Polling firm/Commissioner	Fieldwork date	Sample size							Other/ None/ Not care	Question	Lead
Polling firm/Commissioner	Fieldwork date	Sample size	Maestre MM	Almeida PP	Villacís CS	Maroto PSOE	O. Smith Vox	Sotomayor UP	Other/ None/ Not care	Question	Lead
40dB/Prisa	12–17 May 2023	800	13.3	36.8	9.7	14.7	7.8	3.6	6.8	7.3	22.1

== Results ==
← Summary of the 28 May 2023 City Council of Madrid election results →
Parties and alliances	Popular vote			Seats	
Parties and alliances	Votes	%	±pp	Total	+/−
People's Party (PP)	729,304	44.49	+20.24	29	+14
More Madrid–Greens Equo (MM–VQ)	313,712	19.14	−11.85	12	−7
Spanish Socialist Workers' Party (PSOE)	274,786	16.76	+3.01	11	+3
Vox (Vox)	148,994	9.09	+1.42	5	+1
United We Can (Podemos–IU–AV)^{1}	80,219	4.89	+2.26	0	±0
Citizens–Party of the Citizenry (CS)	47,429	2.89	−16.28	0	−11
Animalist Party with the Environment (PACMA)^{2}	8,530	0.52	+0.02	0	±0
Professionals for Madrid–Recover Madrid (Profesionales)	6,442	0.39	New	0	±0
For a Fairer World (PUM+J)	2,647	0.16	+0.09	0	±0
Blank Seats to Leave Empty Seats (EB)	2,496	0.15	New	0	±0
Feminist Party of Spain (PFE)	2,069	0.13	New	0	±0
Seniors in Action (3e)	1,632	0.10	New	0	±0
Cannabis Party–Green Light (PC–LV)	1,436	0.09	New	0	±0
Communist Party of the Workers of Spain (PCTE)	1,140	0.07	+0.03	0	±0
Spanish Phalanx of the CNSO (FE de las JONS)	970	0.06	+0.01	0	±0
Humanist Party (PH)	815	0.05	+0.01	0	±0
Communist Party of the Peoples of Spain (PCPE)	742	0.05	±0.00	0	±0
Castilian Party–Commoners' Land (PCAS–TC)	733	0.04	−0.05	0	±0
Madrid Capital Coalition (CMC)	396	0.02	New	0	±0
Union for Leganés (ULEG)	335	0.02	+0.01	0	±0
Progress of Cities (Progreso de Ciudades)	307	0.02	New	0	±0
Blank ballots	14,093	0.86	+0.43		
Total	1,639,227			57	±0
Valid votes	1,639,227	99.25	−0.39		
Invalid votes	12,333	0.75	+0.39		
Votes cast / turnout	1,651,560	69.21	+0.98		
Abstentions	734,733	30.79	−0.98		
Registered voters	2,386,293				
Sources
Footnotes: ^{1} United We Can results are compared to United Left–Municipalist Stand Up Madrid totals in the 2019 election.; ^{2} Animalist Party with the Environment results are compared to Animalist Party Against Mistreatment of Animals totals in the 2019 election.

Popular vote
PP	44.49%
MM–VQ	19.14%
PSOE	16.76%
Vox	9.09%
Podemos–IU	4.89%
CS	2.89%
Others	1.87%
Blank ballots	0.86%

Seats
PP	50.88%
MM–VQ	21.05%
PSOE	19.30%
Vox	8.77%

== Aftermath ==
=== Government formation ===
Investiture
Ballot →	17 June 2023	
Required majority →	29 out of 57	
José Luis Martínez-Almeida (PP): • PP (29)	29 / 57	check
Rita Maestre (MM–VQ): • MM–VQ (12)	12 / 57	X mark
Reyes Maroto (PSOE): • PSOE (11)	11 / 57	X mark
Javier Ortega Smith (Vox): • Vox (5)	5 / 57	X mark
Abstentions/Blank ballots	0 / 57	
Absentees	0 / 57	

== Bibliography ==
- Constitución Española (Constitution). Official State Gazette (in Spanish). 27 December 1978 [version as of 27 September 2011]. BOE-A-1978-31229.
- Ley 7/1985, de 2 de abril, Reguladora de las Bases del Régimen Local (Law 7/1985). Official State Gazette (in Spanish). 2 April 1985 [version as of 29 December 2021]. BOE-A-1985-5392.
- Ley Orgánica 5/1985, de 19 de junio, del Régimen Electoral General (Organic Law 5/1985). Official State Gazette (in Spanish). 19 June 1985 [version as of 3 October 2022]. BOE-A-1985-11672.
- Real Decreto 207/2023, de 3 de abril, por el que se convocan elecciones locales y a las Asambleas de Ceuta y Melilla para el 28 de mayo de 2023 (Royal Decree 207/2023). Official State Gazette (in Spanish). 3 April 2023. BOE-A-2023-8458.
