= 2027 Madrid municipal election =

Election in the Spanish municipality of Madrid

- 23 May 2027

All 59 (Note: Seat total has been manually calculated by applying the electoral rules set out in the law, on the basis of the latest official population figures provided by the Spanish government as of 2026. As such, it should be deemed as a provisional, non-binding estimation. The definitive allocation will be determined by the election decree at the time of the parliament's dissolution. The City Council size was set at 57 seats for the previous election.) seats in the City Council of Madrid 30 seats needed for a majority
- Opinion polls
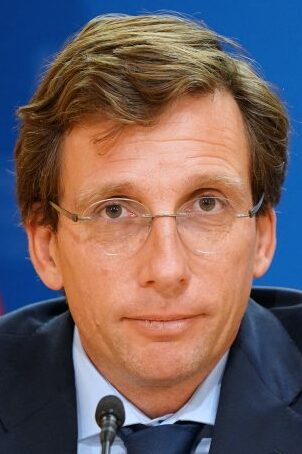

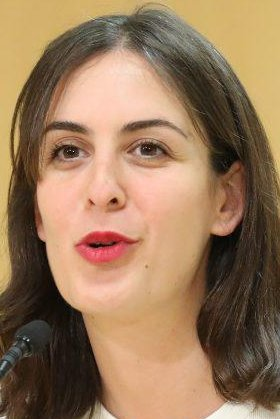

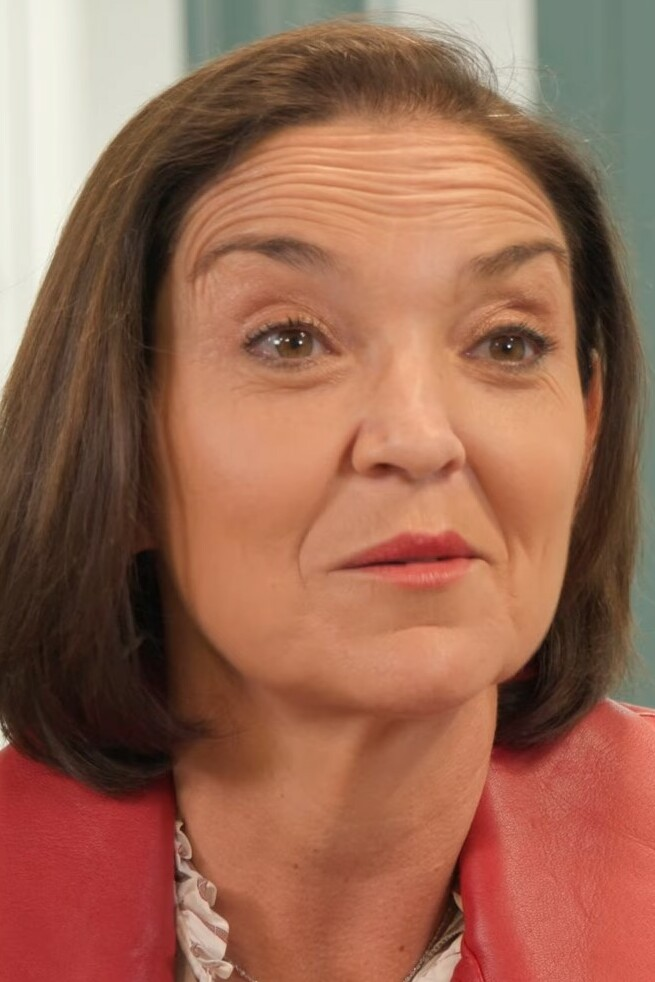

| Leader | José Luis Martínez-Almeida | Rita Maestre | Reyes Maroto |
| Party | PP | MM–VQ | PSOE |
| Leader since | 28 April 2017 | 30 July 2020 | 21 November 2022 |
| Last election | 29 seats, 44.5% | 12 seats, 19.1% | 11 seats, 16.8% |
| Current seats | 29 | 12 | 11 |
| Seats needed | In majority | ▲17 | ▲18 |
| Leader | Arantxa Cabello |
| Party | Vox |
| Leader since | 12 February 2026 |
| Last election | 5 seats, 9.1% |
| Current seats | 2 |
| Seats needed | ▲27 |
Incumbent Mayor
José Luis Martínez-Almeida
PP

A municipal election will be held in Madrid on 23 May 2027 to elect the 13th City Council of the municipality. All 59 seats in the City Council will be up for election. It will be held concurrently with regional elections in at least seven autonomous communities and local elections all across Spain.

== Overview ==
Under the 1978 Constitution, the governance of municipalities in Spain—part of the country's local government system—is centered on the figure of city councils (Spanish: ayuntamientos), local corporations with independent legal personality composed of a mayor, a government council and an elected legislative assembly. The mayor is indirectly elected by the local assembly, requiring an absolute majority; otherwise, the candidate from the most-voted party automatically becomes mayor (ties are resolved by drawing lots). In the case of Madrid, the top-tier administrative and governing body is the City Council of Madrid.

=== Date ===
The term of local assemblies in Spain expires four years after the date of their previous election, with election day being fixed for the fourth Sunday of May every four years (as of 2026, this has been the year before a leap year). The election decree shall be issued no later than 54 days before the scheduled election date and published on the following day in the Official State Gazette (BOE). The previous local elections were held on 28 May 2023, setting the date for election day on the fourth Sunday of May four years later, which is 23 May 2027.

Local assemblies can not be dissolved before the expiration of their term, except in cases of mismanagement that seriously harm the public interest and imply a breach of constitutional obligations, in which case the Council of Ministers can—optionally—decide to call a by-election.

=== Electoral system ===
Voting for local assemblies is based on universal suffrage, comprising all Spanish nationals over 18 years of age, registered and residing in the municipality and with full political rights (provided that they have not been deprived of the right to vote by a final sentence), as well as resident non-national European citizens, and those whose country of origin allows reciprocal voting by virtue of a treaty.

Local councillors are elected using the D'Hondt method and closed-list proportional voting, with a five percent-threshold of valid votes (including blank ballots) in each municipality. Each municipality is a multi-member constituency, with a number of seats based on the following scale:

| Population | Councillors |
|---|---|
| <100 | 3 |
| 101–250 | 5 |
| 251–1,000 | 7 |
| 1,001–2,000 | 9 |
| 2,001–5,000 | 11 |
| 5,001–10,000 | 13 |
| 10,001–20,000 | 17 |
| 20,001–50,000 | 21 |
| 50,001–100,000 | 25 |
| >100,001 | +1 per each 100,000 inhabitants or fraction +1 if total is an even number |

The law does not provide for by-elections to fill vacant seats; instead, any vacancies arising after the proclamation of candidates and during the legislative term will be filled by the next candidates on the party lists or, when required, by designated substitutes.

=== Current council ===
The table below shows the composition of the political groups in the local assembly at the present time.

Current Council composition
| Groups | Parties | Councillors | |
| Groups | Parties | Seats | Total |
|---|---|---|---|
| People's Party's Municipal Group | PP | 29 | 29 |
| More Madrid Municipal Group | Más Madrid | 12 | 12 |
| Socialist Municipal Group in Madrid | PSOE | 11 | 11 |
| Vox Municipal Group | Vox | 2 | 5 |
| Vox Municipal Group | INDEP | 3 (Note: Ignacio Ansaldo, Javier Ortega Smith and Carla Toscano, former Vox councillors.) | 5 |

== Parties and candidates ==
The electoral law allows for parties and federations registered in the interior ministry, alliances and groupings of electors to present lists of candidates. Parties and federations intending to form an alliance are required to inform the relevant electoral commission within 10 days of the election call, whereas groupings of electors need to secure the signature of a determined amount of the electors registered in the municipality for which they seek election, disallowing electors from signing for more than one list. In the case of Madrid, as its population is over 1,000,001, at least 8,000 signatures are required. Amendments in 2024 required a balanced composition of men and women in the electoral lists through the use of a zipper system.

Below is a list of the main parties and alliances which will likely contest the election:

| Candidacy | Parties and alliances | Leading candidate | Ideology | Previous result | | Gov. | Ref. |
| Candidacy | Parties and alliances | Leading candidate | Ideology | Vote % | Seats | Gov. | Ref. |
|---|---|---|---|---|---|---|---|
| PP | List: People's Party (PP) | José Luis Martínez-Almeida | Conservatism; Christian democracy | 44.5% | 29 | Yes | |
| MM–VQ | List: More Madrid (Más Madrid); Greens Equo (Verdes Equo) | Rita Maestre | Progressivism; Participatory democracy Green politics | 19.1% | 12 | No | |
| PSOE | List: Spanish Socialist Workers' Party (PSOE) | Reyes Maroto | Social democracy | 16.8% | 11 | No | |
| Vox | List: Vox (Vox) | Arantxa Cabello | Right-wing populism Ultranationalism; National conservatism | 9.1% | 5 | No | |

== Opinion polls ==
The tables below list opinion polling results in reverse chronological order, showing the most recent first and using the dates when the survey fieldwork was done, as opposed to the date of publication. Where the fieldwork dates are unknown, the date of publication is given instead. The highest percentage figure in each polling survey is displayed with its background shaded in the leading party's colour. If a tie ensues, this is applied to the figures with the highest percentages. The "Lead" column on the right shows the percentage-point difference between the parties with the highest percentages in a poll.

=== Graphical summary ===
Local regression trend line of poll results from 28 May 2023 to the present day, with each line corresponding to a political party.

=== Voting intention estimates ===
The table below lists weighted voting intention estimates. Refusals are generally excluded from the party vote percentages, while question wording and the treatment of "don't know" responses and those not intending to vote may vary between polling organisations. When available, seat projections determined by the polling organisations are displayed below (or in place of) the percentages in a smaller font; 29 seats are required for an absolute majority in the City Council of Madrid.

| Polling firm/Commissioner | Fieldwork date | Sample size | Turnout | PP | Más Madrid | PSOE | Vox | Unidas Podemos Podemos (Spanish political party) | CS | Sumar | SALF | Lead |
|---|---|---|---|---|---|---|---|---|---|---|---|---|
| Data10/Okdiario | 11–12 Jun 2026 | 1,500 | ? | 44.6; 28 | 18.2; 11 | 18.7; 11 | 11.7; 7 | 3.7; 0 | – | – | – | 25.9 |
| GAD3/PP | 20–26 May 2026 | 1,000 | ? | 47.6; 30 | 18.5; 11 | 16.3; 10 | 9.9; 6 | 2.7; 0 | – | – | – | 29.1 |
| Sigma Dos/Telemadrid | 19 Mar 2026 | ? | ? | ? 28/29 | ? 9/10 | ? 12/13 | ? 5/6 | ? 0 | – | – | – | ? |
| Sigma Dos/Telemadrid | 27 May 2025 | ? | ? | 47.6; 30/31 | 15.3; 9/10 | 20.8; 13 | 7.4; 4 | 4.4; 0 | – | – | – | 26.8 |
| GAD3/ABC | 15–24 Apr 2025 | 657 | ? | 48.5; 30 | 16.9; 10 | 19.5; 12 | 9.3; 5 | 2.9; 0 | – | – | – | 29.0 |
| GAD3/PP | 18–27 Mar 2025 | 1,001 | ? | 49.7; 30 | 16.3; 10 | 19.4; 12 | 8.8; 5 | – | – | – | – | 30.3 |
| 2024 EP election | 9 Jun 2024 | —N/a | 57.4 | 41.8 (27) | (Note: Within Sumar.) | 27.8 (18) | 9.8 (6) | 5.0 (3) | 1.2 (0) | 6.1 (3) | 4.2 (0) | 14.0 |
| Data10/Okdiario | 15 May 2024 | ? | ? | 47.4; 30 | 17.0; 10 | 19.2; 12 | 9.3; 5 | 2.8; 0 | – | – | – | 28.2 |
| GAD3/PP | 7–10 May 2024 | 808 | ? | 49.6; 30 | 17.6; 11 | 19.9; 12 | 7.6; 4 | 2.0; 0 | – | – | – | 29.7 |
| IMOP/MM | 8–16 Apr 2024 | 1,410 | ? | 46.4; 29 | 20.7; 13 | 18.6; 11 | 7.6; 4 | 2.7; 0 | 0.9; 0 | – | – | 25.7 |
| 2023 general election | 23 Jul 2023 | —N/a | 73.4 | 41.8 (25) | | 27.3 (16) | 12.4 (7) | | – | 16.5 (9) | – | 14.5 |
| 2023 municipal election | 28 May 2023 | —N/a | 69.2 | 44.5; 29 | 19.1; 12 | 16.8; 11 | 9.1; 5 | 4.9; 0 | 2.9; 0 | – | – | 25.4 |

== Bibliography ==
- Constitución Española (Constitution). Official State Gazette (in Spanish). 27 December 1978 [version as of 20 May 2026]. BOE-A-1978-31229.
- Ley 7/1985, de 2 de abril, Reguladora de las Bases del Régimen Local (Law 7/1985). Official State Gazette (in Spanish). 2 April 1985 [version as of 3 June 2026]. BOE-A-1985-5392.
- Ley Orgánica 5/1985, de 19 de junio, del Régimen Electoral General (Organic Law 5/1985). Official State Gazette (in Spanish). 19 June 1985 [version as of 2 July 2026]. BOE-A-1985-11672.
