= Rita Maestre =

Spanish political scientist and politician (born 1988)

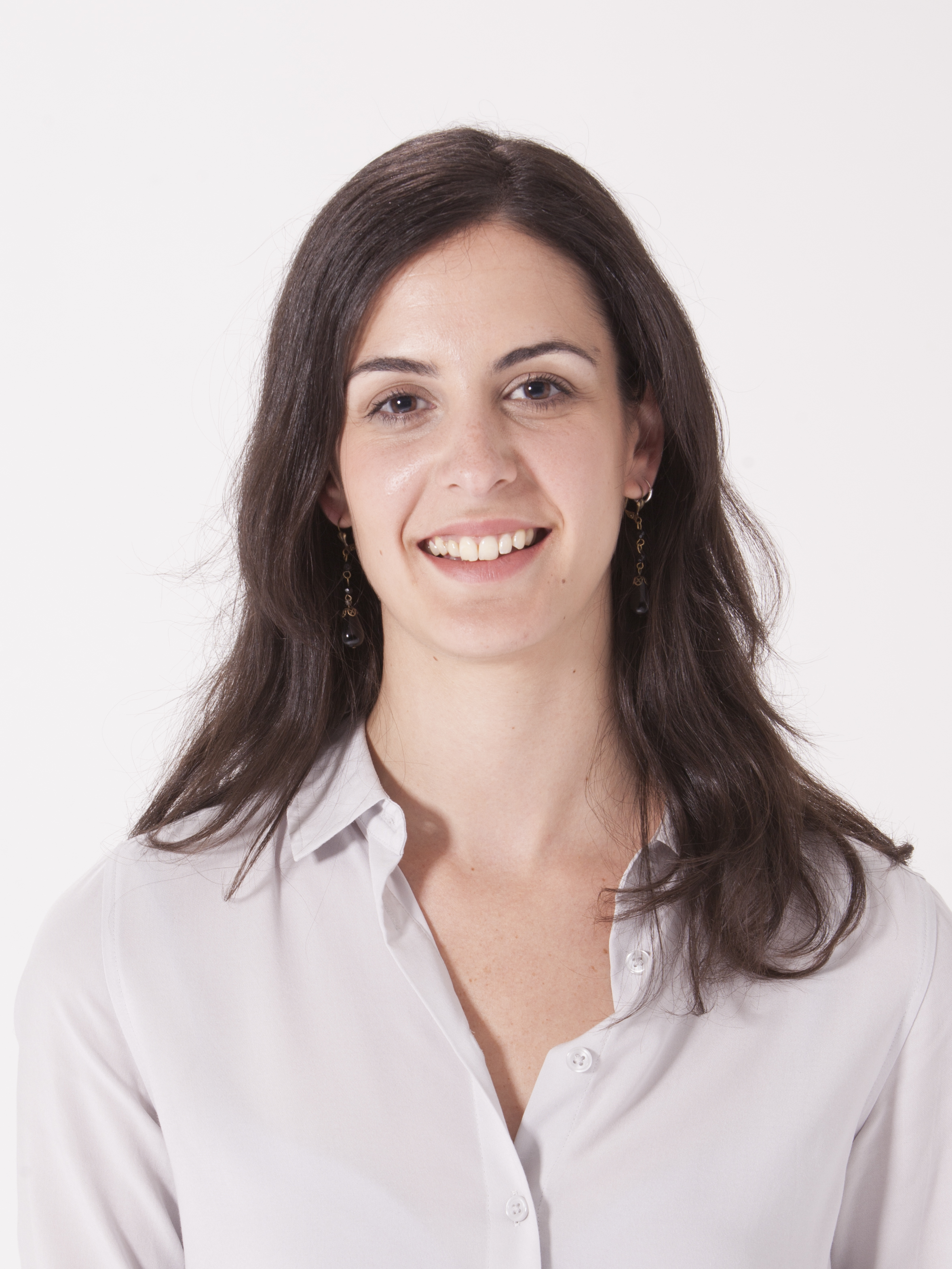
- In 2015

Madrid city councillor
- Incumbent
- Assumed office 13 June 2015

Personal details
- Born: 13 April 1988 (age 38) Madrid, Spain
- Citizenship: Spanish
- Party: Más Madrid (since 2019)
- Other political affiliations: Podemos (2014–2018); Ahora Madrid (2015–2019)
- Education: Complutense University of Madrid

Rita Maestre Fernández (born 1988) is a Spanish political scientist and politician. A member of the Madrid City Council since 2015, she served as Spokesperson of the municipal government board presided by Manuela Carmena from 2015 to 2019.

== Biography ==
Born in Madrid on 13 April 1988, she grew up in the neighborhood of Ventas. She is daughter of civil servants, her father having worked for the Tax Agency and her mother for the City Council. Graduated in political science at the Complutense University of Madrid (UCM) she later took post-graduate studies in International Economy. She was a founder of the Juventud sin Futuro group in 2011 and took part in the 15-M protests. A collaborator in LaTuerka TV show, she joined Podemos, helping in the party campaign for the 2014 European Parliament election.

Following the October 2014 Podemos meeting in Vistalegre, Maestre became a member of the party's Citizen Council in the Constituent Assembly celebrated a month later.

She ran 5th in the Ahora Madrid list for the May 2015 Madrid municipal election, being elected to the City Council. As Manuela Carmena was invested as the new Mayor on 13 June, Maestre was included in the municipal government board (Junta de Gobierno) assuming the government area of "Spokeswomanship, Coordination of the Government Board and Relations with the Plenary". She also briefly held the councillery-presidency of the Salamanca district.

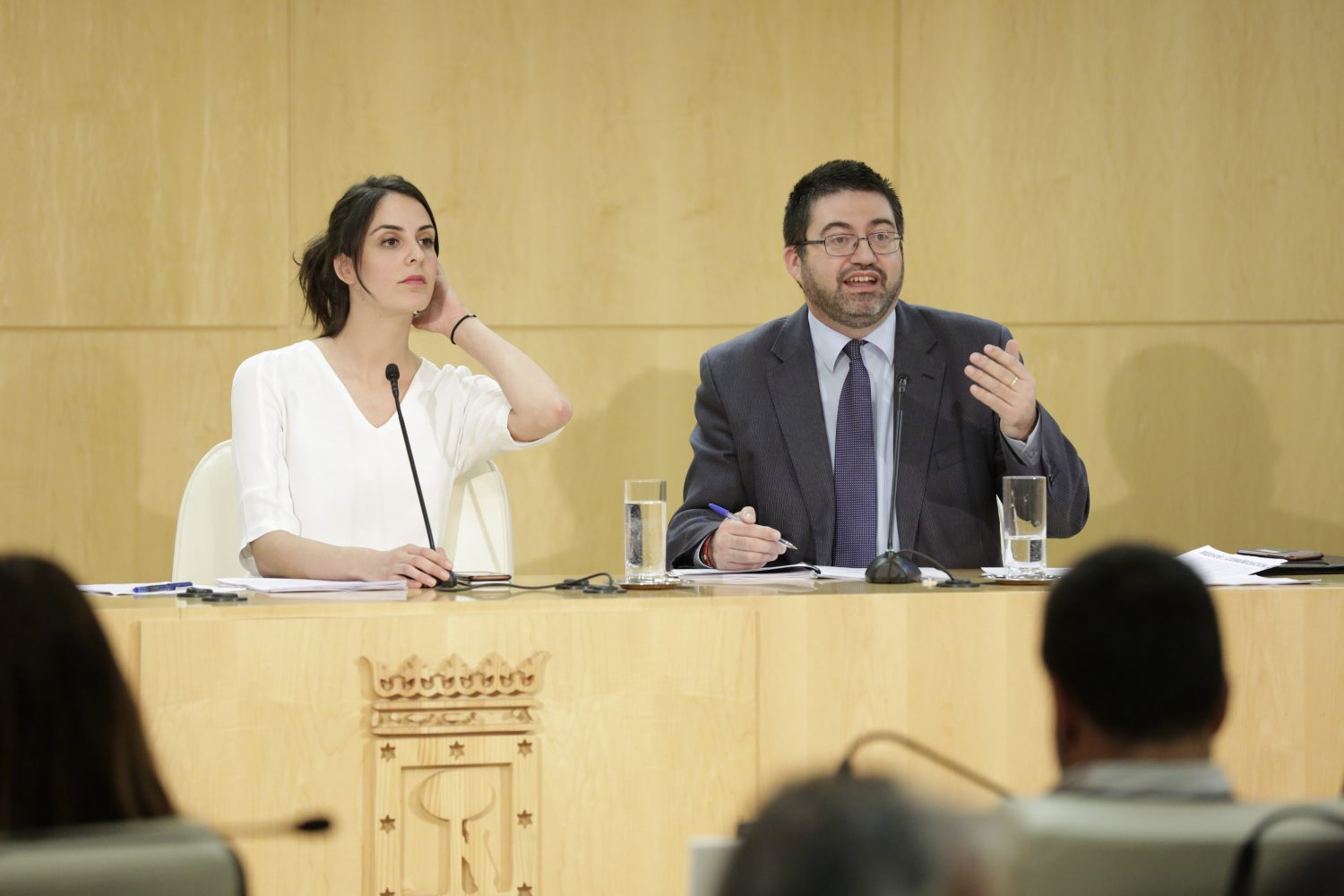
Along Carlos Sánchez Mato, during the announcement of the Financial Plan for the 2017–2018 biennium.

Days after assuming office, she was charged with a transgression of "offense to religious feelings" due to her participation in a 2011 pro-laicist protest in the chapel of the UCM Faculty of Psychology, for which she was initially sentenced to pay €4,320 in March 2016, ultimately being fully acquitted in December 2016 after appealing to a higher judicial instance.

Maestre stood as challenger to the leadership of the regional organization of Podemos in the Community of Madrid. Considered linked to the 'errejonista' faction, her candidature "Adelante Podemos" was beaten by Ramón Espinar's "Juntas Podemos" in the November 2016 primary election.

Following the renouncement of Maestre and other 5 councillors members of Podemos and also members of the municipal group of Ahora Madrid to run in the Podemos process to select the candidates to the 2019 municipal election (pending potential mergings into a wider candidature), preferring to directly do it instead in the Más Madrid platform around Carmena, all 6 councillors' individual memberships to Podemos were suspended in a precautionary basis in November 2018 after a request by Julio Rodríguez.

She ran 3rd in the Más Madrid list for the May 2019 Madrid municipal election, being elected to the City Council. Even though Más Madrid won the elections, Carmena could not continue as mayor of the capital of Spain due to a pact to form a coalition government made by the People's Party, Citizens and Vox. After Carmena left public life, primaries took place so as to choose the spokesperson of Más Madrid in the City Council. She won the primaries to Marta Higueras, becoming the leader of the opposition to government of the conservative mayor José Luis Martínez-Almeida. In May 2023 Madrid municipal election she ran as candidate of Más Madrid for mayor of Madrid.
