= Begoña Villacís =

Spanish politician

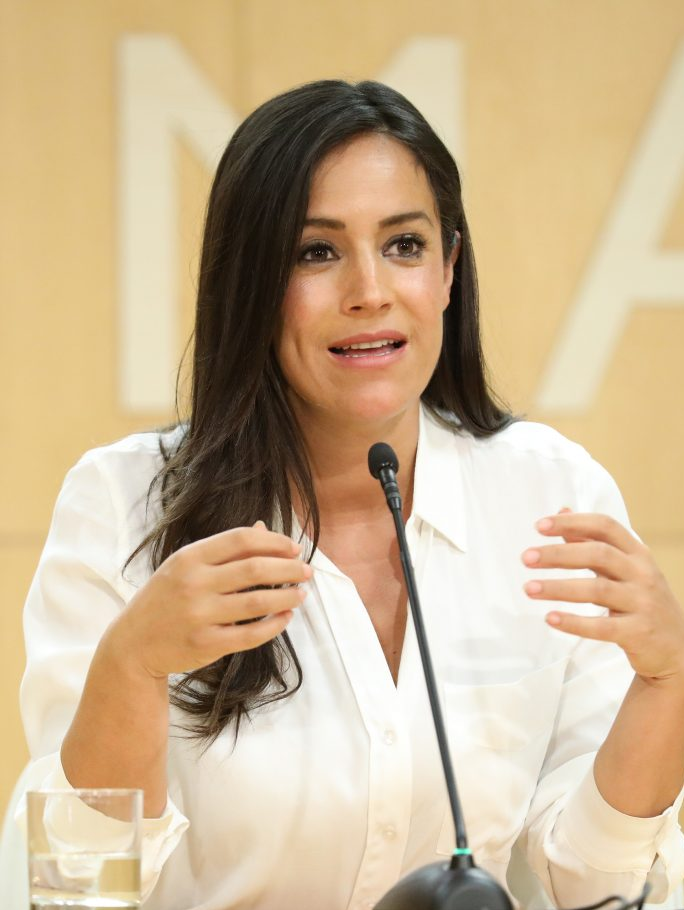
- Villacís in 2019

Deputy Mayor of Madrid
- In office 15 June 2019 – 17 June 2023
- Mayor: José Luis Martínez-Almeida
- Preceded by: Marta Higueras
- Succeeded by: Inma Sanz

Member of the City Council of Madrid
- In office 13 June 2015 – 17 June 2023

Spokesperson of Ciudadanos Group in the City Council of Madrid
- In office 13 June 2015 – 17 June 2023
- Preceded by: Office created
- Succeeded by: Office suppressed

Personal details
- Born: Begoña Villacís Sánchez; 4 November 1977 (age 48) Madrid, Spain
- Party: Citizens (2015–2023)
- Education: Universidad CEU San Pablo; Comillas Pontifical University
- Occupation: Lawyer and politician

Begoña Villacís Sánchez (born 4 November 1977) is a Spanish lawyer and former politician. A member of the Citizens party, she was a councillor in the City Council of Madrid from 2015 to 2023. From 2019 to 2023, she was deputy mayor of Madrid in the government of Mayor José Luis Martínez-Almeida.

== Early life and career ==
Villacís was born in Madrid in 1977 and her first studies were at La Salle de San Rafael charter school. She lived in Virginia, U.S. between 1992 and 1995. She obtained her degree on law in 2000 from CEU San Pablo University and in 2002 she obtained a master's degree in Tax Advice and Tax Law by the Comillas Pontifical University. She said she decided to be a lawyer while watching the film 12 Angry Men.

In June 2003, she became responsible for the Tax, Labour and Commercial Law Areas at Legalitas, a law firm in Spain. As an analyst of legal issues, she regularly collaborated in well-known television shows such as Amigas y conocidas, El gato al agua, España Directo and La mañana de La 1.

== Political career ==
At a television gathering, she met the Citizens Party President Albert Rivera. A voter of Citizens, Villacís began to collaborate with the party in September 2014, advising on local taxes, and she finally joined the party in early 2015. In February 2015 she held a meeting with far-right party Vox, where the later party offered her a position in the list for the 2015 regional election to the Assembly of Madrid but she preferred to maintain the commitment to Citizens. That same month, she ran in her party's primary to be candidate for mayor of Madrid. She defeated her opponent Jaime Trabuchelli, with 60% of the votes.

The Citizens list for the May 2015 Madrid municipal election headed by Villacís obtained 7 councillors. She could not vote for herself because, at that time, she was a registered resident of Villanueva del Pardillo. During the 2015–2019 Madrid City Council meeting she acted as Spokesperson of her political group.

She renewed her seat for the period 2019–2023 in the 26 May 2019 municipal election. Her list won 11 seats, 4 up from the 7 seats obtained in 2011. Her party and Vox endorsed the People's Party candidate José Luis Martínez-Almeida in the investiture vote that took place during the opening session of the new council on 15 June. As part of the investiture agreement Villacís became First Deputy Mayor.

In the 2023 Madrid City Council election, Citizens were wiped out after not meeting the 5% minimum vote share to obtain seats in the council. Villacis subsequently left politics.

== Personal life ==
In June 2024, Villacis's younger brother Borja was fatally shot. He had a long history of involvement in far-right football hooliganism and drug trafficking.
