= Javier Ortega Smith =

Spanish lawyer and politician

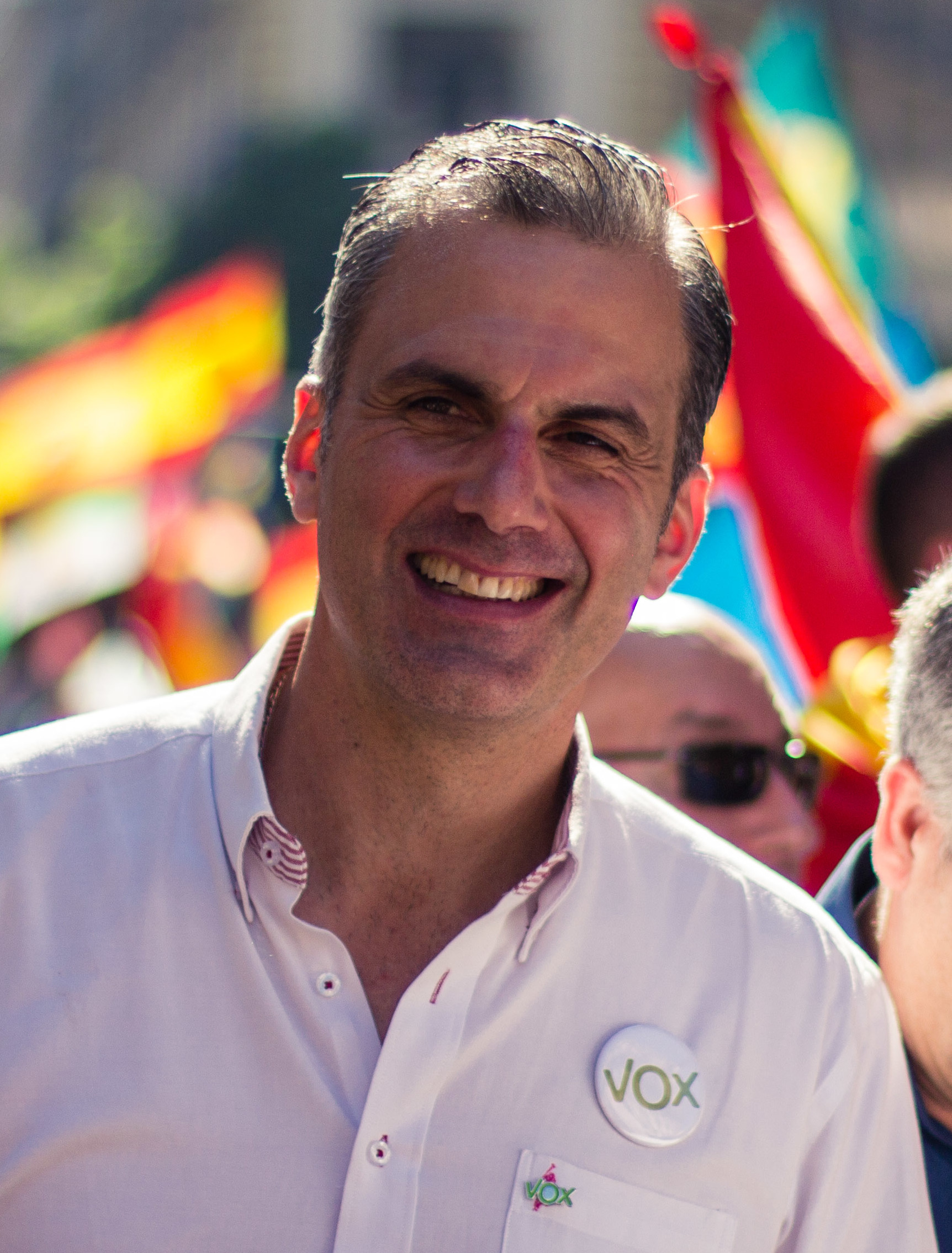
- Ortega Smith in 2018

Secretary-General of Vox
- In office 5 March 2016 – 6 October 2022
- President: Santiago Abascal
- Preceded by: Iván Espinosa de los Monteros
- Succeeded by: Ignacio Garriga

Member of the Congress of Deputies
- Incumbent
- Assumed office 21 May 2019
- Constituency: Madrid

Member of the City Council of Madrid
- Incumbent
- Assumed office 15 June 2019

Personal details
- Born: Francisco Javier Ortega Smith-Molina; 28 August 1968 (age 58) Madrid, Spain
- Citizenship: Spain; Argentina
- Party: Independent (since 2026)
- Other political affiliations: Vox (2014–2026); Foro (1994–1995); FE de las JONS (1985–1991)
- Spouse: Paulina Sánchez del Río Nájera (m. 2021)
- Education: University of Alcalá; Comillas Pontifical University

Francisco Javier Ortega Smith-Molina (Spanish pronunciation: [esmiθ.moˈlina]; born 28 August 1968) is a Spanish lawyer and politician. He served as Secretary-General of Vox between 2014 and 2022, making him the second most prominent person in the party after its president Santiago Abascal. He serves as a member of both the Congress of Deputies and the Madrid City Council since 2019.

== Biography ==
Ortega Smith was born on 28 August 1968 in Madrid. His father, Víctor Manuel Ortega Fernández-Arias, is Spanish, and a lawyer by training. His mother, Ana María Smith-Molina Robbiati, is an Argentine, of English and Italian descent. She was born in a well-off Porteño family whose wealth comes from construction. He holds dual Spanish and Argentine citizenship. The son and grandson of lawyers, Ortega Smith is also a cousin of Juan Chicharro Ortega, general in reserve duty and chief executive officer of the Francisco Franco National Foundation, whom Ortega Smith keeps a close relationship with. His three brothers have had business careers, becoming business owners. Despite his family living in the Arturo Soria area of Madrid (in Ciudad Lineal), he studied at the San Agustín School at Padre Damián Street, Chamartín. He later undertook studies in law at an educational centre in Toledo dependent to the Complutense University of Madrid, finishing his degree at the University of Alcalá.

Collaborator in Así, theoretical bulletin of Falange Española de las JONS of Ciudad Lineal, in 1986 he signed in this journal the article No olvidar (Do not forget), where Ortega Smith extolled the figure of José Antonio Primo de Rivera and glorified the interwar Falange party.

He reportedly spent 9 months fulfilling the mandatory military conscription within the COE 13, part of the Special Operations Groups (GOE), located in the San Pedro Base, Colmenar Viejo. He was a keen practitioner of martial arts until a knee injury prevented him from continuing.

He stood in the 1994 European Parliament election as candidate of the Foro-CDS coalition headed by science popularizer Eduard Punset.

Settled in Chamberí, Ortega Smith started a professional career as a lawyer. In 2012 he was hired as lawyer of Santiago Abascal during a trial at the Audiencia Nacional against some individuals who had allegedly verbally abused Abascal in the Basque Country years ago; accompanied in the trial by Iván Espinosa de los Monteros, this trio, along with the wife of the latter, Rocío Monasterio, became close acquaintances. He worked in the judicial department of the DENAES Foundation ("for the Defence of the Spanish Nation"), also serving as spokesman of the organisation.

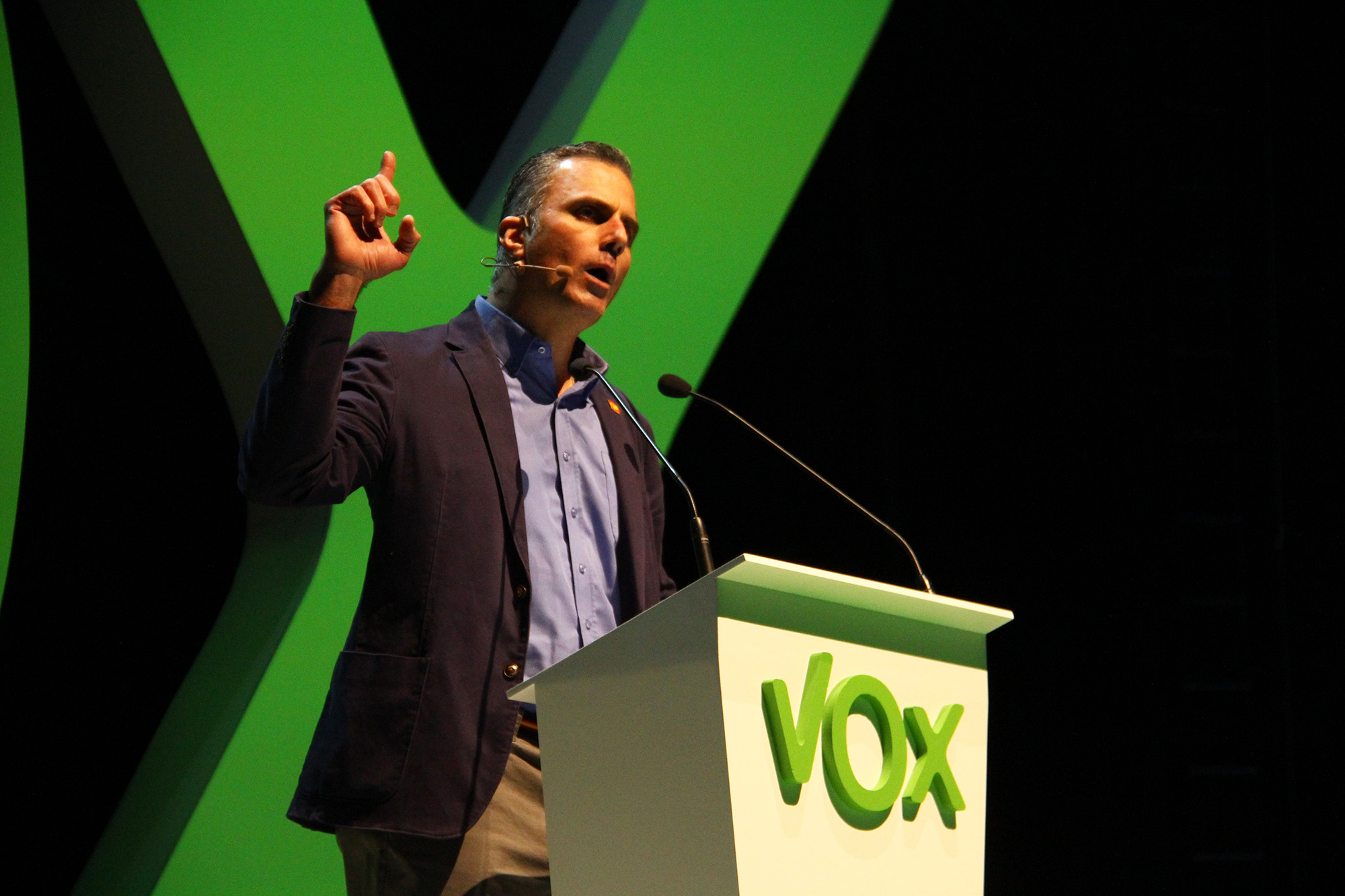
Ortega Smith during a Vox rally in 2018

A founding member of Vox, he was included in 2013 as provisional vice-president of the organisation in the procedure for the registration of the political party in the Ministry of the Interior required for its legalisation. He headed the Vox electoral list for the 2015 municipal election in Madrid. He also bid for a senatorial seat representing Madrid in the 2015 and 2016 general elections, failing to become a member of the Upper House after receiving, respectively, 34,702 and 26,781 votes, well short of the 725,719 and 720,901 votes obtained by the last elected senator in each election.

In June 2016 he took part in a propaganda stunt along with other Vox members in Gibraltar, spreading a Spanish flag in the British overseas colony. To avoid being arrested, he fled by swimming away from the Rock. Tasked with managing the judicial strategy of Vox, he played a role in the popular accusation exerted by Vox in the judicial proceedings at the High Court of Justice of Catalonia, the Audiencia Nacional and the Supreme Court against Catalan separatist leaders facing criminal charges, including the televised oral trial.

After the 2018 Andalusian regional election, he was the national delegate of the party signing the accord with the People's Party for the composition of the Board of the Parliament of Andalusia that ultimately gained Vox a seat in it, thereby rapidly frustrating the attempt to establish a cordon sanitaire around the far right party by the rest of parliamentary forces.

Ortega Smith, who ran second in the Vox list in Madrid for the Congress of Deputies vis-à-vis the 28 April 2019 general election, was elected member of the 13th term of the Congress of Deputies. He also ran first in the Vox list in the 26 May 2019 Madrid municipal election, and became a municipal councillor.

In October 2019 Ortega Smith accused Las Trece Rosas (thirteen young female members of the Unified Socialist Youth executed by a Francoist firing squad shortly after the end of the Spanish Civil War), of having been "torturers", "murderers" and "rapists" despite providing no evidence for this. Not even the Francoist regime itself accused them of any such crimes, having sentenced them to death merely on the basis of the generic "adhesion to the rebellion".

On 10 March 2020, during the ongoing coronavirus pandemic, Vox confirmed that Ortega Smith had tested positive for SARS-CoV-2. Ortega Smith, who had travelled to Lombardy in February, showed symptoms similar to those of the Coronavirus two days before during a party convention celebrated at Vistalegre attended by 9,000 party sympathizers, where he visibly hugged, shook hands and kissed plenty of people. On 7 March he had also reportedly greeted the 1,100 guests to a dinner in Jaén one by one.

In October 2022 he was replaced as secretary-general by Ignacio Garriga, as a way of closing the inner party crisis after Macarena Olona left the organisation.

== Stances ==
Ortega Smith is a staunch militarist. He argues that the history of Spain is "inalienable" and defines it as inextricably "linked to the sword and the cross". According to Guillermo Fernández, the 2018 Vistalegre bullring speech by Ortega Smith—that started by praising the "leading" role of Spanish forces in the 1571 victory of the Battle of Lepanto over "barbarism", the aim being to fuel a sense of the Nation's historical destiny–was an attempt to connect with the discursive and ideological ideas of the Spanish extreme right. As guest at the demonstration of the police association Jusapol in Barcelona on 29 September 2018, his speech during the event included a diatribe against the European Union. He has scorned illegal immigrants as alleged "carriers of serious infectious diseases".

He has defended Spanish anticommunist and Falangist leader, José Antonio Primo de Rivera as "one of the great men in history". In October 2019, he provoked a controversy by accusing "Las Trece Rosas" (thirteen young women executed by the Franco regime in August 1939) of having been 'torturers', 'murderers' and 'rapists'. The Franco regime itself accused them only of having defended the Spanish Republic during the Civil War. He defends pro-Israeli positions.

== Ancestry ==
Ancestors of Francisco Javier Ortega Smith-Molina

8. Juan Ortega Rubio; (1845–1921)
4. Víctor Manuel Ortega Pérez; (d. 1962)
2. Víctor Manuel Ortega Fernández-Arias
5. Sara Fernández-Arias García-Bustelo; (d. 1999)
1. Francisco Javier Ortega Smith Molina; (b. 1962)
3. Ana María Smith-Molina Robbiati

Party political offices
Preceded by Iván Espinosa de los Monteros	Secretary General of Vox; Since September 2014	Incumbent
