= Más Madrid =

Left-wing regionalist political party in Spain

More Madrid Más Madrid
- Co-spokespersons: Mónica García; Rita Maestre; Manuela Bergerot
- Founder: Manuela Carmena; Íñigo Errejón
- Founded: 22 November 2018
- Registered: 7 February 2019
- Split from: Podemos
- Preceded by: Ahora Madrid
- Youth wing: Jóvenes Más Madrid
- Ideology: Progressivism; Green politics; Left-wing populism
- Political position: Left-wing to far-left
- National affiliation: Confederal Left (Note: In the Senate.); Sumar (since 2023); Broad Front (since 2026); Senate of Progress (since 2026) (Note: In the Senate)
- Colours: Emerald
- Congress of Deputies (Madrid seats): 2 / 37
- Senate (Madrid seats): 1 / 11
- Assembly of Madrid: 26 / 135
- Madrid City Council: 12 / 57
- City councils in the Community of Madrid (Note: Excluding the City of Madrid.): 95 / 2,260

Website
- masmadrid.org

Más Madrid (English: "More Madrid") is a progressive regional political party in Spain co-founded by Manuela Carmena and Íñigo Errejón. Its primary strength is located in the city of Madrid. It promotes green politics, having cooperated with like-minded parties such as the Greens Equo and European Green Party members. It sits on the left-wing to far-left of the political spectrum.

It was founded as the electoral platform formed around Manuela Carmena to succeed Ahora Madrid in Carmena's bid for re-election in the 2019 Madrid City Council election. After the crisis sparked in January 2019 by Íñigo Errejón's announcement to form a tandem with Carmena ahead of the 2019 Madrilenian regional election, the platform threatened to cause a major split in Podemos in the Community of Madrid. The party currently leads the opposition in both the Assembly of Madrid and the Madrid City Council, and it is also the biggest group in the latter, having overtaken the Spanish Socialist Workers' Party as the main leftist party in the region.

== History ==
Logo until 2023

On 10 September 2018, the then-incumbent mayor of Madrid Manuela Carmena announced that she would run for re-election in the 2019 Madrid municipal election under a new and different platform than the Ahora Madrid party under which she had successfully contested the 2015 election. Carmena wished for her candidacy to be formed by a trusted team made up of members of her municipal government. This clashed with attempts from Podemos and United Left–Madrid to impose party member quotas in the lists, bringing a number of outsider partisan figures in place of Carmena's allies.

On 12 November 2018, all Podemos members in the City Council of Madrid (Rita Maestre, José Manuel Calvo, Jorge Castaño, Esther Gómez, Marta Gómez Lahoz, and Paco Pérez) chose to withdraw from the party's scheduled primary election in the city and instead announced their intention to contest the municipal election within Carmena's planned platform as independents, prompting Podemos to suspend them from party membership. On 22 November, Carmena officially launched her independent Más Madrid platform, which she defined as "innovative, independent, democratic and progressive" and formed "by individuals, not parties".

On 17 January 2019, it was announced that Carmena and Íñigo Errejón, Podemos candidate for president of the Community of Madrid and one of Podemos' founders, had agreed to launch a joint platform to run at the 2019 Madrilenian regional election. Podemos leader Pablo Iglesias announced later that day that he no longer considered Errejón as the party's candidate in the region for placing himself "outside Podemos" by renouncing the party's trademark, and that Podemos and IU would contest the regional election on their own even if that meant competing against Más Madrid and Errejón. Podemos leaders also urged Errejón to resign his seat in the Congress of Deputies, considering his move as "deceitful" and "a betrayal" of the party. On 21 January, Errejón vacated his seat in the Congress but still called for Podemos, IU, and Equo to join the Más Madrid platform.

Some media outlets, such as El Confidencial, had tentatively predicted at first that Más Madrid would become a grouping of electors, as it aimed to distance itself from the umbrella of any political party. On 7 February 2019, it was formally registered as a political party in the interior ministry. The primary election process for electing the party's candidates was scheduled for 12–18 March, with Más Madrid establishing a difference in the method of selecting the candidates intended to assume executive responsibilities and the rest of the list, with the former being elected through a Borda count (with n=57 both in the municipal and regional list) and a Dowdall count for the latter.

Although it became the largest party on the City Council of Madrid after the 2019 Madrid City Council elections, becoming the first group in Madrid City Council to finish ahead of the People's Party of Madrid since the 1987 Madrid City Council elections and the most-voted party in fifteen out of 21 Madrid districts, a coalition government of the People's Party (PP) and Ciudadanos with the external support of the far-right Vox elected José Luis Martínez-Almeida as the new Mayor of Madrid. This led Carmena to follow on her campaign promise by announcing her resignation as councillor.

On 1 July 2019, the party elected its regional appointed member according to its results in the regional elections, with Eduardo Rubiño being the chosen Senator. On 22 September 2019, party members decided that Más Madrid should take part in the November 2019 Spanish general election called after the failure of government negotiations between the Spanish Socialist Workers' Party (PSOE) and Unidas Podemos (UP). Party candidates would run under the Más País banner, officially launched on 25 September, which would include alliances with other parties from across Spain such as Equo, Coalició Compromís or Chunta Aragonesista. Several days later, the party name was officially changed in the register of political parties to Más País. On 10 July 2020, the membership of Más Madrid endorsed Mónica García's list to coordinate the executive board of Más Madrid, with Pablo Gómez Perpinyà and Manuela Bergerot as additional co-coordinators. Days later, the Rita Maestre-led list was chosen to coordinate the municipal executive board of the party in Madrid.

On 5 March 2021, after alleging discrepancies with the current party leadership, especially with Rita Maestre, four Madrid councillors (Marta Higueras, José Manuel Calvo, and Felipe Llamas y Luis Cueto, whow as close to Carmena), announced their departure from the party to become part of the group of non-aligned councilors. Following the 2021 Madrilenian regional election, Más Madrid became the second force in the Assembly of Madrid, becoming the first party aside from the PP and the PSOE to do so in the region, as it surpassed the PSOE as the most voted left-wing force in the region. Europe Elects summarized that "Más Mádrid voters are typically younger than PSOE's, less skewed to the left in the income distribution than UP's and more educated than both PSOE and UP."

On 10 March 2022, the Constitutional Court of Spain supported to the complaint filed by Más Madrid after the 2021 elections, in which the party was excluded from the Bureau of the Madrid Assembly despite having obtained 15% of the votes in favor of Vox, which obtained 8% of the votes, establishing that article 23.2 of the Constitution was violated as the "right of access to the position under conditions of equality was violated in this case due to the lack of proportionality of the agreement reached, which left a party (Más Madrid) that had obtained almost double the percentage of votes out of the Parliament's management body than another that did achieve a position (Vox)". However, this declaration had mere declarative effects, as the legislature already concluded when Isabel Díaz Ayuso called for the 2021 snap elections.

== Election results ==
=== Assembly of Madrid ===
Assembly of Madrid
Election	Leading candidate	Votes	%	Seats	+/–	Government
2019	Íñigo Errejón	475,672	14.69 (#4)	20 / 132	20	Opposition
2021	Mónica García	619,215	16.99 (#2)	24 / 136	4	Opposition
2023	Mónica García	615,171	18.35 (#2)	27 / 135	3	Opposition

=== Madrid City Council ===
City Council of Madrid
Election	Leading candidate	Votes	%	Seats	+/–	Government
2019	Manuela Carmena	505,159	30.99 (#1)	19 / 57	1 (Note: Compared to Ahora Madrid totals in the 2015 Madrid City Council election.)	Opposition
2023	Rita Maestre	313,205	19.14 (#2)	12 / 57	7	Opposition

=== Cortes Generales ===
Cortes Generales
Election	Congress					Senate		Leading candidate	Status in legislature
Election	Votes	%	No.	Seats	+/–	Seats	+/–	Leading candidate	Status in legislature
2023	Within Sumar			1 / 350	1	1 / 208	0	Tesh Sidi (Note: Sidi was the leader of Más Madrid in the Congress, the leader of the Sumar coalition was Yolanda Díaz.)	Coalition (PSOE–Sumar)

== Symbols ==
Logo from 2018 to 2023

Logo from 2023 to present

Alternative logo
