= 2019 Madrid municipal election =

Election in the Spanish municipality of Madrid

- 26 May 2019

All 57 seats in the City Council of Madrid 29 seats needed for a majority
- Opinion polls
- Registered: 2,397,881 ▲0.5%
- Turnout: 1,635,963 (68.2%) ▼0.7 pp
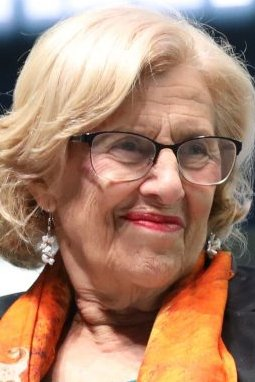

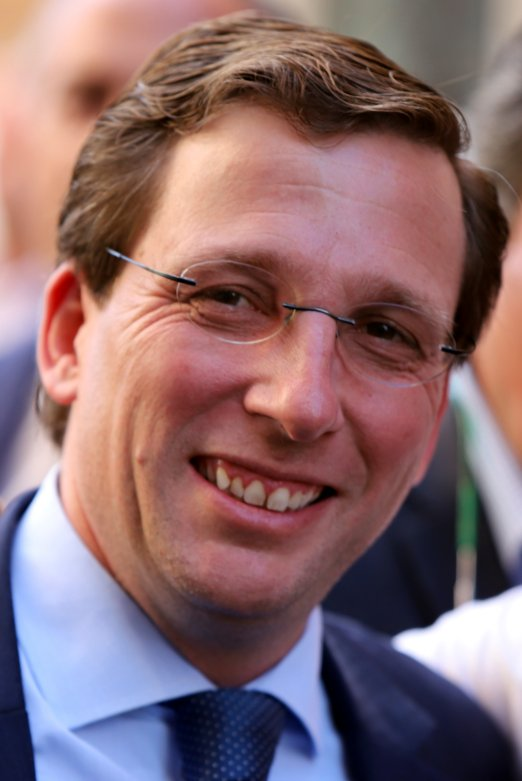

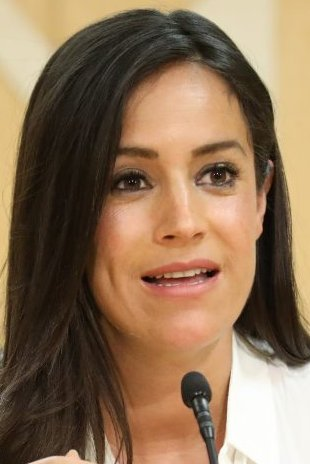

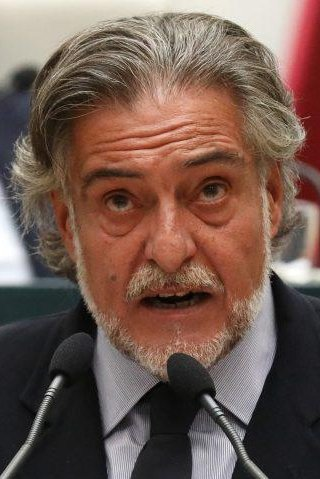

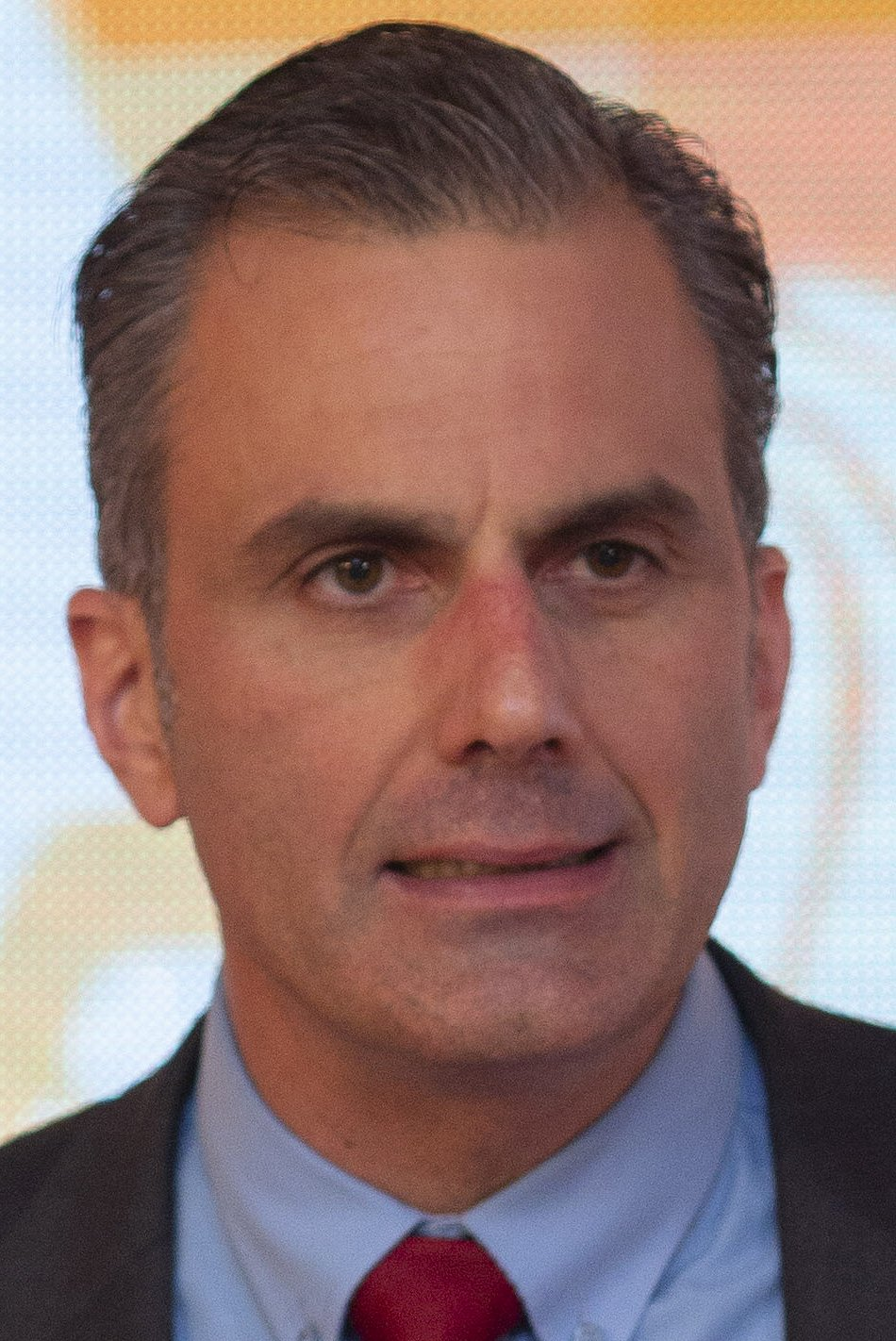
	First party	Second party	Third party
Leader	Manuela Carmena	José Luis Martínez-Almeida	Begoña Villacís
Party	Más Madrid	PP	Cs
Leader since	30 March 2015	28 April 2017	2 March 2015
Last election	20 seats, 31.8% (Note: Results for Ahora Madrid in the 2015 election.)	21 seats, 34.6%	7 seats, 11.4%
Seats won	19	15	11
Seat change	▼1	▼6	▲4
Popular vote	505,159	395,344	312,536
Percentage	31.0%	24.3%	19.2%
Swing	▼0.8 pp	▼10.3 pp	▲7.8 pp
	Fourth party	Fifth party
Leader	Pepu Hernández	Javier Ortega Smith
Party	PSOE	Vox
Leader since	9 March 2019	18 April 2019
Last election	9 seats, 15.3%	0 seats, 0.6%
Seats won	8	4
Seat change	▼1	▲4
Popular vote	224,074	124,969
Percentage	13.7%	7.7%
Swing	▼1.6 pp	▲7.1 pp
Mayor before election
Manuela Carmena
Más Madrid
Mayor after election
José Luis Martínez-Almeida
PP

A municipal election was held in Madrid on 26 May 2019 to elect the 11th City Council of the municipality. All 57 seats in the City Council were up for election. It was held concurrently with regional elections in twelve autonomous communities and local elections all across Spain, as well as the 2019 European Parliament election.

The election saw incumbent mayor Manuela Carmena's More Madrid platform becoming the largest political force in the City Council, the first time since 1987 than a party other than the People's Party (PP) did so, but the net loss of two seats for the left-from-centre bloc—including the Spanish Socialist Workers' Party (PSOE)—deprived them of a majority. Instead, the opposition PP, despite obtaining its worst historical result in a municipal election in Madrid, was able to get its candidate José Luis Martínez-Almeida as the new local mayor through an alliance with the liberal Citizens (Cs) and the far-right Vox.

== Overview ==
Under the 1978 Constitution, the governance of municipalities in Spain—part of the country's local government system—was centered on the figure of city councils (Spanish: ayuntamientos), local corporations with independent legal personality composed of a mayor, a government council and an elected legislative assembly. The mayor was indirectly elected by the local assembly, requiring an absolute majority; otherwise, the candidate from the most-voted party automatically became mayor (ties were resolved by drawing lots). In the case of Madrid, the top-tier administrative and governing body was the City Council of Madrid.

=== Date ===
The term of local assemblies in Spain expired four years after the date of their previous election, with election day being fixed for the fourth Sunday of May every four years. The election decree was required to be issued no later than 54 days before the scheduled election date and published on the following day in the Official State Gazette (BOE). The previous local elections were held on 24 May 2015, setting the date for election day on the fourth Sunday of May four years later, which was 26 May 2019.

Local assemblies could not be dissolved before the expiration of their term, except in cases of mismanagement that seriously harmed the public interest and implied a breach of constitutional obligations, in which case the Council of Ministers could—optionally—decide to call a by-election.

Elections to the assemblies of local entities were officially called on 2 April 2019 with the publication of the corresponding decree in the BOE, setting election day for 26 May.

=== Electoral system ===
Voting for local assemblies was based on universal suffrage, comprising all Spanish nationals over 18 years of age, registered and residing in the municipality and with full political rights (provided that they had not been deprived of the right to vote by a final sentence), (Note: Amendments in 2018 granted the right to vote to those legally incapacitated.) as well as resident non-national European citizens, and those whose country of origin allowed reciprocal voting by virtue of a treaty.

Local councillors were elected using the D'Hondt method and closed-list proportional voting, with a five percent-threshold of valid votes (including blank ballots) in each municipality. Each municipality was a multi-member constituency, with a number of seats based on the following scale:

Population	Councillors
<100	3
101–250	5
251–1,000	7
1,001–2,000	9
2,001–5,000	11
5,001–10,000	13
10,001–20,000	17
20,001–50,000	21
50,001–100,000	25
>100,001	+1 per each 100,000 inhabitants or fraction +1 if total is an even number

The law did not provide for by-elections to fill vacant seats; instead, any vacancies arising after the proclamation of candidates and during the legislative term were filled by the next candidates on the party lists or, when required, by designated substitutes.

=== Outgoing council ===
The table below shows the composition of the political groups in the local assembly at the time of the election call.

Parliamentary composition in April 2019
Groups	Parties	Councillors	
Groups	Parties	Seats	Total
People's Party's Municipal Group	PP	21	21
Madrid Now Municipal Group	Más Madrid	11	20
Madrid Now Municipal Group	IU–Madrid	4	20
Madrid Now Municipal Group	Ganemos	4	20
Madrid Now Municipal Group	Equo	1	20
Socialist Municipal Group in Madrid	PSOE	9	9
Citizens–Party of the Citizenry Municipal Group	Cs	7	7

== Parties and candidates ==
The electoral law allowed for parties and federations registered in the interior ministry, alliances and groupings of electors to present lists of candidates. Parties and federations intending to form an alliance were required to inform the relevant electoral commission within 10 days of the election call, whereas groupings of electors needed to secure the signature of a determined amount of the electors registered in the municipality for which they sought election, disallowing electors from signing for more than one list. In the case of Madrid, as its population was over 1,000,001, at least 8,000 signatures were required. Additionally, a balanced composition of men and women was required in the electoral lists, so that candidates of either sex made up at least 40 percent of the total composition.

Below is a list of the main parties and alliances which contested the election:

Candidacy	Parties and alliances	Leading candidate	Ideology	Previous result		Gov.	Ref.
Candidacy	Parties and alliances	Leading candidate	Ideology	Vote %	Seats	Gov.	Ref.
PP	List: People's Party (PP)	José Luis Martínez-Almeida	Conservatism; Christian democracy	34.6%	21	No	
Más Madrid	List: More Madrid (Más Madrid); Equo (Equo)	Manuela Carmena	Progressivism; Participatory democracy Green politics	31.8%	20	Yes	
PSOE	List: Spanish Socialist Workers' Party (PSOE)	Pepu Hernández	Social democracy	15.3%	9	No	
Cs	List: Citizens–Party of the Citizenry (Cs)	Begoña Villacís	Liberalism	11.4%	7	No	
IU–MpM	List: United Left–Madrid (IU–Madrid) – Communist Party of Madrid (PCM) – The Dawn Marxist Organization (La Aurora (OM)) – Republican Left (IR) – Feminist Party of Spain (PFE); Anticapitalists Madrid (Anticapitalistas Madrid); Municipalist Group (Bancada Municipalista)	Carlos Sánchez Mato	Anti-capitalism; Communism	1.7% (Note: Results for IUCM–LV in the 2015 election.)	0	No	
Vox	List: Vox (Vox)	Javier Ortega Smith	Right-wing populism Ultranationalism; National conservatism	0.6%	0	No	

== Opinion polls ==
The tables below list opinion polling results in reverse chronological order, showing the most recent first and using the dates when the survey fieldwork was done, as opposed to the date of publication. Where the fieldwork dates are unknown, the date of publication is given instead. The highest percentage figure in each polling survey is displayed with its background shaded in the leading party's colour. If a tie ensues, this is applied to the figures with the highest percentages. The "Lead" column on the right shows the percentage-point difference between the parties with the highest percentages in a poll.

=== Voting intention estimates ===
The table below lists weighted voting intention estimates. Refusals are generally excluded from the party vote percentages, while question wording and the treatment of "don't know" responses and those not intending to vote may vary between polling organisations. When available, seat projections determined by the polling organisations are displayed below (or in place of) the percentages in a smaller font; 29 seats were required for an absolute majority in the City Council of Madrid.

Color key:

Poll conducted after legal ban on opinion polls Exit poll

Polling firm/Commissioner	Fieldwork date	Sample size	Turnout	PP	Ahora Madrid	PSOE	Cs	IU–Madrid	Vox	PACMA	Podemos	Unidas Podemos	Más Madrid	Lead
2019 municipal election	26 May 2019	—N/a	68.2	24.3; 15	–	13.7; 8	19.2; 11	2.6; 0	7.7; 4	0.5; 0	–	–	31.0; 19	6.7
Sigma Dos/Telemadrid	26 May 2019	?	?	19.4; 11/12	–	13.8; 8/9	18.3; 10/11	3.1; 0	8.0; 4/5	–	–	–	35.6; 21/23	16.2
ElectoPanel/Electomanía	22–23 May 2019	?	?	21.3; 13	–	17.1; 10	19.3; 11	1.5; 0	7.9; 4	–	–	–	31.3; 19	10.0
ElectoPanel/Electomanía	21–22 May 2019	?	?	20.7; 12	–	17.1; 10	20.0; 12	1.6; 0	7.5; 4	–	–	–	31.1; 19	10.4
ElectoPanel/Electomanía	20–21 May 2019	?	?	20.7; 12	–	17.2; 10	20.2; 12	1.7; 0	7.7; 4	–	–	–	31.0; 19	10.3
ElectoPanel/Electomanía	19–20 May 2019	?	?	20.6; 12	–	17.0; 10	20.3; 12	1.4; 0	7.5; 4	–	–	–	31.1; 19	10.5
GIPEyOP (Note: "Encuesta GIPEyOP: Europeas y Locales 2019". GIPEyOP (in Spanish). 20 May 2019. Archived from the original on 23 May 2019.)	7–20 May 2019	121	?	22.7; 14	–	11.5; 7	22.2; 13	4.8; 0	8.8; 5	–	–	–	29.0; 18	6.3
GAD3/ABC	19 May 2019	?	?	20.5; 11/13	–	17.3; 9/11	18.9; 10/12	0.9; 0	6.8; 4	–	–	–	32.4; 19/21	11.9
SocioMétrica/El Español	19 May 2019	900	?	23.9; 15/16	–	15.3; 9/10	14.4; 8/9	–	6.6; 3/4	–	–	–	32.9; 20/21	9.0
ElectoPanel/Electomanía	16–19 May 2019	?	?	20.1; 12	–	17.4; 10	20.3; 12	1.5; 0	8.0; 4	–	–	–	30.9; 19	10.6
Top Position	16–18 May 2019	1,200	?	20.3; 12	–	17.2; 10	18.8; 11	–	9.9; 6	–	–	–	30.7; 18	10.4
Demoscopia Servicios/ESdiario	13–18 May 2019	1,200	?	21.4; 13	–	17.3; 10	19.5; 11	–	8.0; 4	–	–	–	31.6; 19	10.2
IMOP/El Confidencial	14–17 May 2019	800	72.0	23.5; 14	–	16.3; 9/10	17.6; 11	1.5; 0	6.1; 3	–	–	–	31.4; 19/20	7.9
ElectoPanel/Electomanía	13–16 May 2019	?	?	20.1; 12	–	18.2; 11	21.0; 12	1.9; 0	8.7; 5	–	–	–	28.3; 17	7.3
KeyData/Público	15 May 2019	?	?	21.1; 13	–	18.1; 10	19.7; 12	–	9.6; 5	–	–	–	28.0; 17	6.9
DYM/El Independiente	10–15 May 2019	495	?	22.2; 12/13	–	17.5; 10	18.0; 10/11	–	9.1; 5	–	–	–	31.4; 19/20	9.2
Metroscopia/Henneo (Note: "PP, Cs y Vox logran retener la Comunidad y arrebatan a Carmena el Ayuntamiento". La Información (in Spanish). 20 May 2019. Archived from the original on 20 May 2019.)	10–14 May 2019	800	76	23.3; 14	–	13.5; 8	19.7; 11	3.0; 0	8.9; 5	–	–	–	31.4; 19	8.1
Sigma Dos/El Mundo	10–13 May 2019	500	?	21.6; 12/14	–	16.6; 9/10	16.5; 9/10	1.5; 0	6.7; 4	–	–	–	34.8; 20/22	13.2
ElectoPanel/Electomanía	10–13 May 2019	?	?	20.6; 12	–	18.4; 11	21.3; 13	2.1; 0	9.5; 5	–	–	–	25.7; 16	4.4
NC Report/La Razón	11 May 2019	?	?	21.5; 13	–	18.5; 11	19.4; 12	3.1; 0	7.9; 4	–	–	–	27.5; 17	6.0
ElectoPanel/Electomanía	7–10 May 2019	?	?	20.0; 12	–	18.6; 11	21.9; 13	2.0; 0	9.9; 6	–	–	–	24.6; 15	2.7
40dB/El País	3–9 May 2019	801	?	19.1; 11/12	–	14.0; 8	20.0; 12	–	6.7; 4	–	–	–	35.2; 21/22	15.2
ElectoPanel/Electomanía	4–7 May 2019	?	?	19.5; 12	–	18.0; 11	22.5; 13	2.1; 0	10.2; 6	–	–	–	24.7; 15	2.2
ElectoPanel/Electomanía	29 Apr–4 May 2019	?	?	19.4; 12	–	18.1; 11	22.9; 14	2.6; 0	9.9; 6	–	–	–	24.0; 14	1.1
April 2019 general election	28 Apr 2019	—N/a	78.9	20.9 (12)	–	27.0 (16)	19.9 (12)	(Note: Within Unidas Podemos.)	12.7 (7)	1.2 (0)		16.5 (10)	–	6.9
CIS	21 Mar–23 Apr 2019	991	?	23.8; 13/15	–	18.4; 10/12	14.2; 8/9	2.2; 0	5.8; 2/3	–	–	–	33.8; 21/23	10.0
ElectoPanel/Electomanía	31 Mar–7 Apr 2019	?	?	22.5; 14	–	15.1; 9	18.8; 11	2.8; 0	13.7; 8	–	–	–	23.8; 15	1.3
InvyMark/Telemadrid	3 Apr 2019	400	?	21.5; 13	–	16.4; 10	17.2; 10	1.0; 0	17.3; 10	–	–	–	24.1; 14	2.6
ElectoPanel/Electomanía	24–31 Mar 2019	?	?	22.0; 13	–	15.1; 9	19.4; 12	2.8; 0	13.8; 8	–	–	–	23.6; 15	1.6
ElectoPanel/Electomanía	17–24 Mar 2019	?	?	22.4; 14	–	15.4; 9	19.1; 11	–	13.5; 8	–	–	–	25.2; 15	2.8
PP	23 Mar 2019	?	?	? 13	–	? 9	? 10	–	? 10	–	–	–	? 15	?
ElectoPanel/Electomanía	10–17 Mar 2019	?	?	22.6; 13	–	14.6; 9	18.0; 11	–	15.8; 9	–	–	–	25.6; 15	3.0
InvyMark/Telemadrid	12 Mar 2019	400	?	22.5; 13	–	14.3; 8	19.0; 11	1.1; 0	14.9; 9	–	–	–	25.8; 16	3.3
ElectoPanel/Electomanía	3–10 Mar 2019	?	?	22.4; 13	–	14.1; 8	18.8; 11	–	15.6; 9	–	–	–	25.9; 16	3.5
ElectoPanel/Electomanía	22 Feb–3 Mar 2019	?	?	21.9; 13	–	14.1; 9	19.1; 12	–	15.6; 9	–	–	–	26.0; 16	4.1
InvyMark/Telemadrid	11–15 Feb 2019	400	?	21.8; 13	–	13.5; 8	21.0; 12	1.3; 0	14.7; 9	–	–	–	25.5; 15	3.7
Equipo MEG/PSOE	30 Jan–3 Feb 2019	800	?	18.2; 10	–	20.9; 12	18.1; 10	5.1; 3	15.1; 9	–	–	–	21.7; 13	0.8
NC Report/La Razón	31 Jan–2 Feb 2019	600	67.8	22.4; 14	–	13.2; 8	20.7; 13	–	10.9; 6	–	–	–	26.9; 16	4.5
Celeste-Tel/eldiario.es	23–30 Jan 2019	400	?	21.9; 13	–	13.7; 8	21.8; 13	2.3; 0	8.2; 5	–	–	–	28.4; 18	6.5
InvyMark/Telemadrid	29 Jan 2019	400	?	22.2; 13	–	12.0; 7	22.1; 13	(Note: Within Más Madrid.)	14.2; 8	–		–	26.1; 16	3.9
InvyMark/Telemadrid	14–15 Jan 2019	400	?	21.8; 13	–	12.6; 7	22.7; 14		12.8; 7	–		–	26.5; 16	3.8
ElectoPanel/Electomanía	9–10 Dec 2018	480	?	13.0; 8	–	11.0; 6	23.8; 15		13.4; 8	0.5; 0		–	32.0; 20	8.2
ElectoPanel/Electomanía	1–8 Nov 2018	450	?	21.9; 13/14	26.5; 16/17	18.2; 11	24.9; 14/15	(Note: Within Ahora Madrid.)	4.8; 0/3	0.5; 0		–	–	1.7
AM	22 Sep 2018	?	?	22.6	24.9	16.9	28.3		–	–		–	–	3.4
NC Report/La Razón	11–14 Sep 2018	800	67.4	30.1; 20	27.0; 18	14.0; 9	15.9; 10		–	–		–	–	3.1
NC Report/La Razón	3–14 May 2018	800	70.2	24.4; 16	23.4; 15	16.3; 11	22.7; 15		2.8; 0	3.2; 0		–	–	1.0
Metroscopia/El País	23 Apr–10 May 2018	1,600	68	19.7; 11/12	28.8; 17/18	14.9; 9	31.2; 19		–	–		–	–	2.4
InvyMark/laSexta	23–27 Apr 2018	?	?	23.8; 14	26.8; 16	17.7; 11	27.1; 16		–	–		–	–	0.3
GAD3/ABC	18–27 Apr 2018	?	?	21.4; 13	28.2; 17	16.5; 10	29.1; 17		–	–		–	–	0.9
Sigma Dos/El Mundo	24–26 Apr 2018	500	?	22.4; 13/14	30.4; 18/19	12.6; 7/8	27.8; 17/18		–	–		–	–	2.6
Equipo MEG/PSOE	13–18 Apr 2018	1,180	?	23.9; 14	19.2; 12	23.8; 14	23.5; 14	5.3; 3	–	–		–	–	0.1
SocioMétrica/El Español	23–30 Mar 2018	600	?	23.5; 15	24.0; 15	12.4; 7	28.0; 17	5.9; 3	1.7; 0	0.8; 0		–	–	4.0
NC Report/La Razón	26–29 Apr 2017	700	63.6	36.2; 22	31.4; 19	14.9; 9	12.2; 7		–	–		–	–	4.8
InvyMark/laSexta	26–27 Apr 2017	?	?	31.0; 19	31.8; 19	17.2; 10	14.6; 9		–	–		–	–	0.8
Metroscopia/El País	24–26 Apr 2017	600	72	24.2; 15	31.8; 19	16.0; 10	21.4; 13		–	–		–	–	7.6
2016 general election	26 Jun 2016	—N/a	73.8	40.2 (24)	–	19.0 (11)	16.6 (10)		0.5 (0)	1.0 (0)		21.2 (12)	–	19.0
2015 general election	20 Dec 2015	—N/a	76.6	35.8 (22)	–	17.0 (10)	17.4 (10)	5.3 (3)	0.7 (0)	0.7 (0)	20.8 (12)	–	–	15.0
GAD3/ABC	4–10 Sep 2015	502	?	33.7; 21	29.1; 18	17.4; 10	13.8; 8	–	–	–		–	–	4.6
NC Report/La Razón	26 Jul–8 Aug 2015	900	65.7	35.0; 22	30.1; 18	14.5; 9	13.5; 8	2.7; 0	–	–		–	–	4.9
NC Report/La Razón	16–20 Jun 2015	900	?	35.7; 22	32.9; 20	13.0; 8	12.6; 7	1.3; 0	–	–		–	–	2.8
2015 municipal election	24 May 2015	—N/a	68.9	34.6; 21	31.8; 20	15.3; 9	11.4; 7	1.7; 0	0.6; 0	0.6; 0		–	–	2.8

=== Voting preferences ===
The table below lists raw, unweighted voting preferences.

Polling firm/Commissioner	Fieldwork date	Sample size	PP	Ahora Madrid	PSOE	Cs	IU–Madrid	Vox	Podemos	Unidas Podemos	Más Madrid	Question	X mark	Lead
2019 municipal election	26 May 2019	—N/a	16.5	–	9.3	13.0	1.8	5.2	–	–	21.1	—N/a	31.8	4.6
April 2019 general election (Note: Does not include non-resident citizens.)	28 Apr 2019	—N/a	16.4	–	21.2	15.6		10.0		12.9	–	—N/a	21.1	4.8
CIS	21 Mar–23 Apr 2019	?	14.9	–	11.3	8.5	1.3	3.4	–	–	25.9	27.9	5.3	11.0
2016 general election	26 Jun 2016	—N/a	29.5	–	14.0	12.2		0.4		15.5	–	—N/a	26.2	14.0
2015 general election	20 Dec 2015	—N/a	27.3	–	12.9	13.3	4.1	0.6	15.9	–	–	—N/a	23.4	11.4
2015 municipal election	24 May 2015	—N/a	23.6	21.8	10.4	7.8	1.2	0.4		–	–	—N/a	31.1	1.8

== Results ==
← Summary of the 26 May 2019 City Council of Madrid election results →
Parties and alliances	Popular vote			Seats	
Parties and alliances	Votes	%	±pp	Total	+/−
More Madrid (Más Madrid)^{1}	505,159	30.99	−0.85	19	−1
People's Party (PP)	395,344	24.25	−10.32	15	−6
Citizens–Party of the Citizenry (Cs)	312,536	19.17	+7.74	11	+4
Spanish Socialist Workers' Party (PSOE)	224,074	13.75	−1.52	8	−1
Vox (Vox)	124,969	7.67	+7.07	4	+4
United Left–Municipalist Stand Up Madrid (IU–MpM)^{2}	42,793	2.63	+0.94	0	±0
Animalist Party Against Mistreatment of Animals (PACMA)	8,226	0.50	−0.09	0	±0
Union, Progress and Democracy (UPyD)	1,642	0.10	−1.73	0	±0
More With You (CNTG+)	1,514	0.09	New	0	±0
Castilian Party–Commoners' Land: Pact (PCAS–TC–PPCCAL–Pacto)	1,477	0.09	+0.06	0	±0
For a Fairer World (PUM+J)	1,183	0.07	New	0	±0
Spanish Phalanx of the CNSO (FE de las JONS)	774	0.05	−0.08	0	±0
Communist Party of the Peoples of Spain (PCPE)	741	0.05	−0.03	0	±0
Humanist Party (PH)	601	0.04	−0.02	0	±0
Intelligent Madrid (MI)	597	0.04	New	0	±0
Communist Party of the Workers of Spain (PCTE)	591	0.04	New	0	±0
Libertarian Party (P–LIB)	476	0.03	−0.01	0	±0
Spanish Catholic Movement (MCE)	313	0.02	New	0	±0
Union for Leganés (ULEG)	164	0.01	−0.01	0	±0
Blank ballots	6,945	0.43	−0.54		
Total	1,630,124			57	±0
Valid votes	1,630,124	99.64	+0.37		
Invalid votes	5,839	0.36	−0.37		
Votes cast / turnout	1,635,963	68.23	−0.67		
Abstentions	761,918	31.77	+0.67		
Registered voters	2,397,881				
Sources
Footnotes: ^{1} More Madrid results are compared to Madrid Now totals in the 2015 election.; ^{2} United Left–Municipalist Stand Up Madrid results are compared to United Left of the Community of Madrid–The Greens totals in the 2015 election.

Popular vote
Más Madrid	30.99%
PP	24.25%
Cs	19.17%
PSOE	13.75%
Vox	7.67%
IU–MpM	2.63%
Others	1.12%
Blank ballots	0.43%

Seats
Más Madrid	33.33%
PP	26.32%
Cs	19.30%
PSOE	14.04%
Vox	7.02%

== Aftermath ==
=== Government formation ===
Investiture
Ballot →	15 June 2019	
Required majority →	29 out of 57	
José Luis Martínez-Almeida (PP): • PP (15); • Cs (11); • Vox (4)	30 / 57	check
Manuela Carmena (Más Madrid): • Más Madrid (19)	19 / 57	X mark
Pepu Hernández (PSOE): • PSOE (8)	8 / 57	X mark
Abstentions/Blank ballots	0 / 57	
Absentees	0 / 57	

== Bibliography ==
- Constitución Española (Constitution). Official State Gazette (in Spanish). 27 December 1978 [version as of 27 September 2011]. BOE-A-1978-31229.
- Ley 7/1985, de 2 de abril, Reguladora de las Bases del Régimen Local (Law 7/1985). Official State Gazette (in Spanish). 2 April 1985 [version as of 4 August 2018]. BOE-A-1985-5392.
- Ley Orgánica 5/1985, de 19 de junio, del Régimen Electoral General (Organic Law 5/1985). Official State Gazette (in Spanish). 19 June 1985 [version as of 6 March 2019]. BOE-A-1985-11672.
- Real Decreto 209/2019, de 1 de abril, por el que se convocan elecciones locales y a las Asambleas de Ceuta y Melilla para el 26 de mayo de 2019 (Royal Decree 209/2019). Official State Gazette (in Spanish). 1 April 2019. BOE-A-2019-4824.
