= Marta Higueras =

Spanish politician (born 1964)

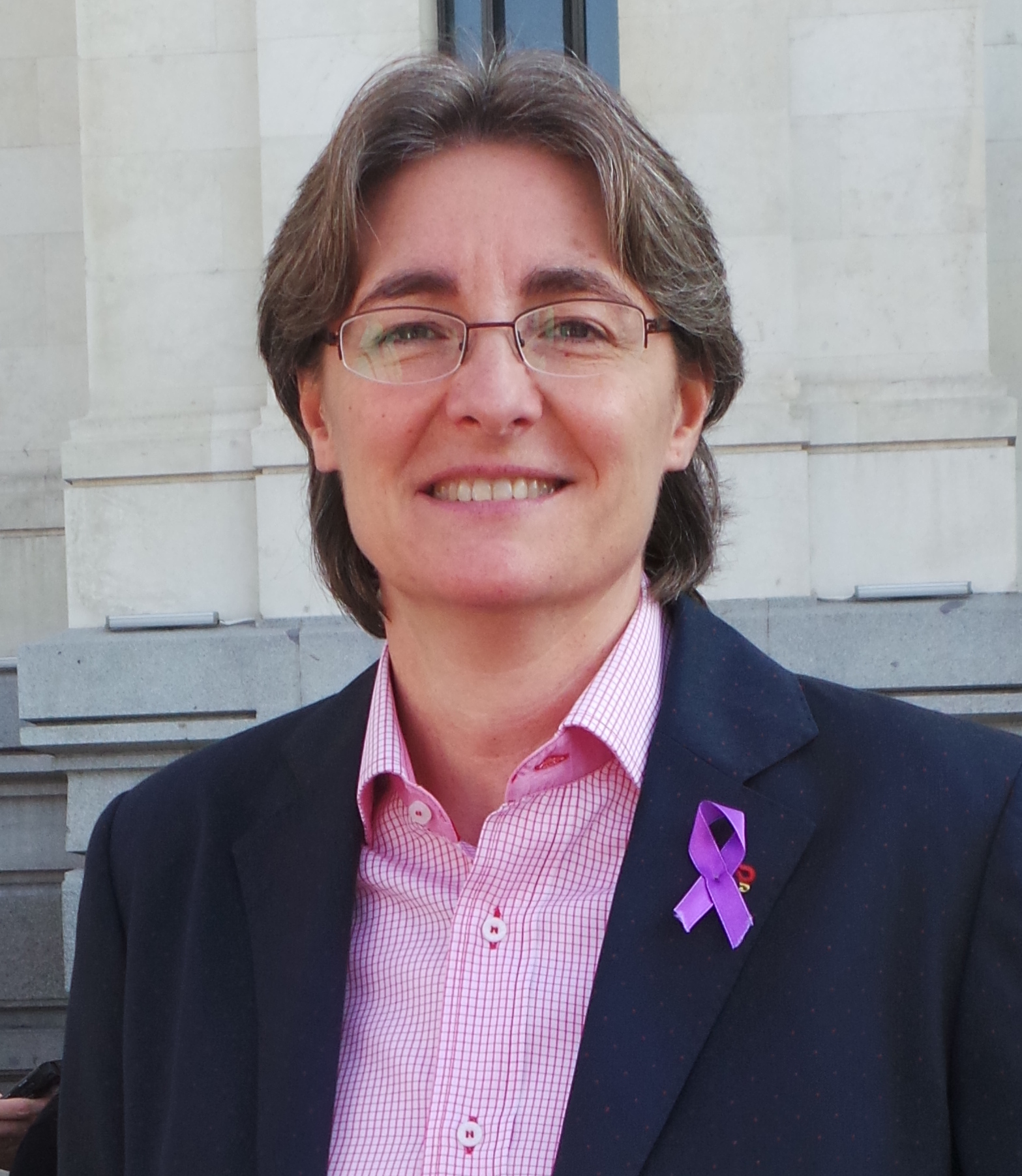
- On 7 November 2015

First Deputy Mayor of Madrid
- In office 13 June 2015 – 15 June 2019
- Mayor: Manuela Carmena
- Preceded by: José Enrique Núñez Guijarro
- Succeeded by: Begoña Villacís

City councillor of Madrid
- In office 13 June 2015 – 17 June 2023

Personal details
- Born: Marta María Higueras Garrobo; 1964 (age 61–62) Madrid, Spain
- Citizenship: Spanish
- Party: Más Madrid (since 2019)
- Other political affiliations: Ahora Madrid (2015–2019)
- Occupation: Criminal mediator; politician

Marta María Higueras Garrobo (born 1964) is a Spanish criminal mediator, linked to the judicial sector from the start of her career. From 2015 to 2019, she served as First Deputy Mayor of Madrid and a councillor in the Department of Equality, Social Rights and Employment.

== Biography ==
Born in Madrid in 1964, she worked as an official in the Juzgados de Plaza de Castilla de Madrid, later taking up the role in the General Council of the Judiciary as head of the Sección de Oficina Judicial for 5 years. In the Basque Country she was adviser for the Justicia con Inmaculada de Miguel and in August 2009 she was named the Director of Justice and Public Administration, a role she occupied during the socialist government of Patxi López, until January 2013. She was also a member of the Commission on Infancy and Adolescence of the Basque Country.

Before working for the City Council of Madrid, she worked in the Tribunal de Cuentas, as secretary to Counsellor María Antonia Lozano after being proposed for the position by Izquierda Unida, for whom she was member of the Equality Commission from 2013-2015.

=== Ahora Madrid ===
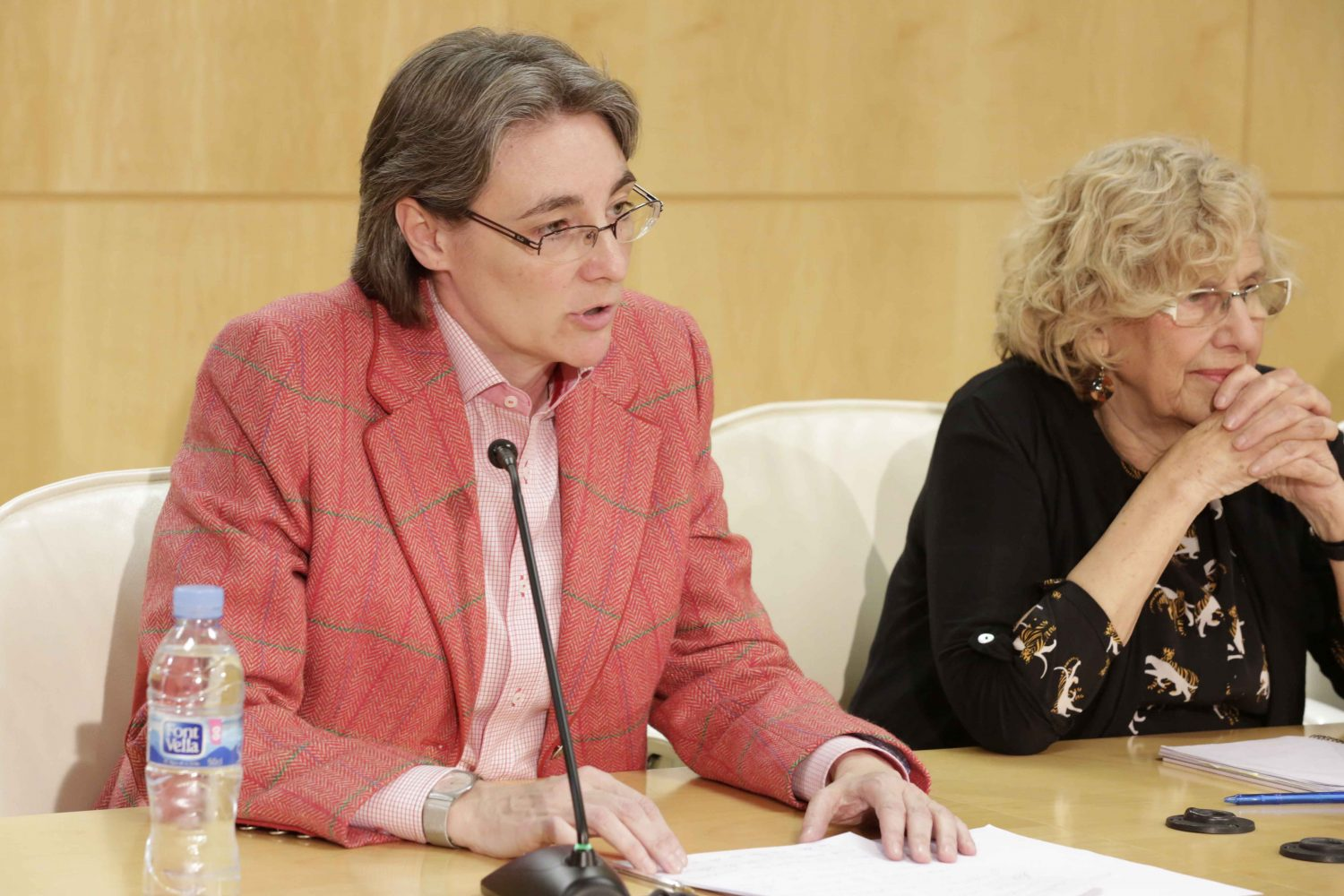
Higueras in March 2017 next to Manuela Carmena.

In the municipal elections of May 2015, Higueras occupied 7th position on the list for Ahora Madrid for the City Council of Madrid.

Some of the media consider Higueras to hold a position of confidence with Manuela Carmena in the City Council of Madrid. She has known the judge since 1992 when they worked together in the Juzgados de Plaza Castilla and since then they have maintained a close relationship. Since June 2015, she has been the deputy mayor for Madrid and a councillor in the Department of Equality, Social Rights and Employment and has carried out the tasks of Deputy Mayor.

== Personal life ==
In 2017, she publicly announced she is lesbian.

Political offices
Preceded by José Enrique Núñez Guijarro	1st Deputy Mayor of Madrid; 13 June 2015 – 15 June 2019	Succeeded by Begoña Villacís
Business positions
Preceded by Ana Botella	Chairwoman of the Madrid's Municipal Housing and Land Company, S.A. Since 2015	Succeeded by
