= Manuela Carmena =

Spanish lawyer, judge, and politician (born 1944)

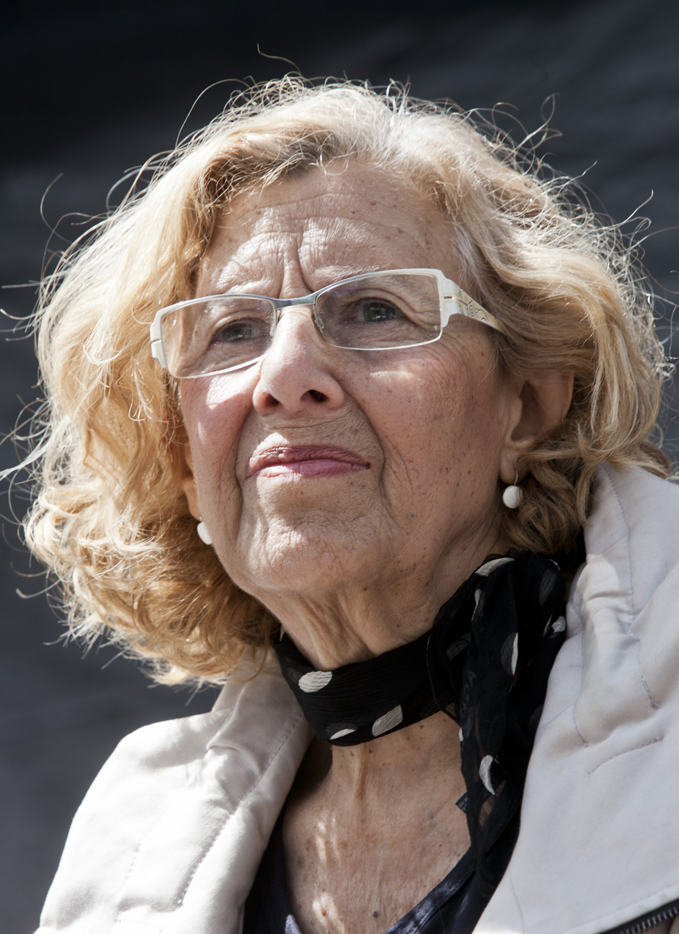
- Manuela Carmena in 2015

Mayor of Madrid
- In office 13 June 2015 – 15 June 2019
- Deputy: Marta Higueras
- Preceded by: Ana Botella
- Succeeded by: José Luis Martínez-Almeida

Member of the City Council of Madrid
- In office 13 June 2015 – 17 June 2019

Member of the General Council of the Judiciary
- In office 26 July 1996 – 7 November 2001

Personal details
- Born: 9 February 1944 (age 82) Madrid, Spain
- Party: Más Madrid (since 2019)
- Other political affiliations: PCE (1965–1981); Ahora Madrid (2015–2019)
- Spouse: Eduardo Leira (m. 1967)
- Children: 2
- Education: University of Valencia
- Profession: Judge; lawyer; politician

Manuela Carmena Castrillo (Spanish pronunciation: [maˈnwela kaɾˈmena kasˈtɾiʎo]; born 9 February 1944) is a retired Spanish lawyer and judge who served as Mayor of Madrid from June 2015 to June 2019. She was a member of the General Council of the Judiciary.

== Biography ==
=== Early life ===
She was born on 9 February 1944 in Madrid, in the area near the Dehesa de la Villa. Both sides of her family had a background in small business: her father Carmelo (a native of Toledo) ran a shirt shop at the corner of Gran Vía and Chinchilla Street in central Madrid. Her mother, meanwhile, worked as a cashier. She attended the French School of the Black Ladies. During her time as a student, Carmena served as voluntary worker in a preserves factory run by the Servicio Universitario del Trabajo.

After graduating in law in 1965 from the University of Valencia, she became a legal representative of workers and detainees during the Francoist State and was co-founder of the labour law office where the 1977 Atocha massacre took place.

Carmena, who joined the Communist Party of Spain (PCE) in 1965, married architect Eduardo Leira in 1967; they have had two children: Eva and Manuel. She ran as a candidate in the PCE list for the 1977 general election in the constituency of Madrid. She had left the party by 1981.

=== Judicial career ===
After passing public examinations to become a judge, she started her judicial career in January 1981. As a judge she began an almost solitary fight to prevent corruption in existing courts. In 1986 she received the National Human Rights Award. She was a founding member of the progressive association Judges for Democracy. Judge of Penitentiary Vigilance and head of the Penitentiary Vigilance Court No. 1 of Madrid, she was elected senior judge of Madrid in 1993. She was appointed as member of the General Council of the Judiciary (proposed by United Left) and served from 1996 to 2001.

=== Activity after retirement ===
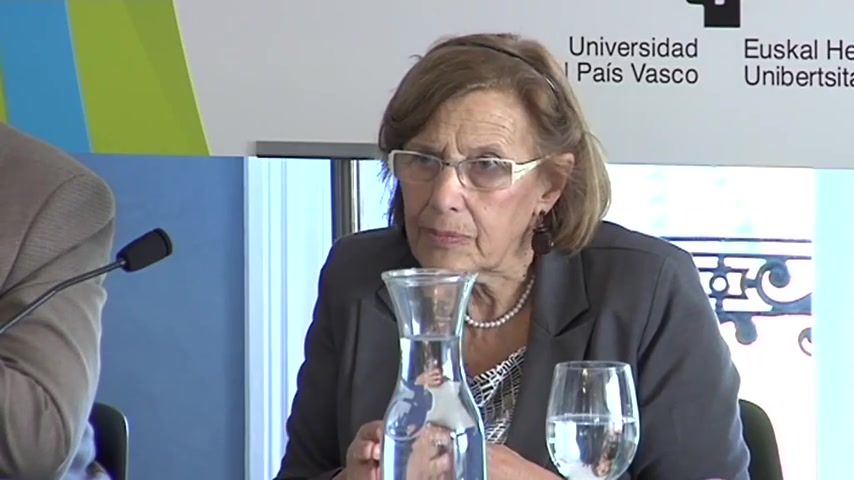
Carmena in 2013

After retiring from the judiciary in 2010, Carmena moved on to become a member of the Patronato de la Fundación Alternativas, a think tank with ties to the Spanish Socialist Workers' Party (PSOE), and whose members included the former Socialist prime ministers Felipe González and José Luis Rodríguez Zapatero. Carmena was Chair-Rapporteur of the United Nations Working Group on Arbitrary Detention, and as such, she has visited Equatorial Guinea, Honduras, Nicaragua and South Africa, among other countries. In September 2011, Carmena was appointed advisor to the Patxi López cabinet of the Basque Government in the area of assistance to victims of police abuse.

Carmena Castrillo founded the supportive cooperative "Yayos emprendedores" (literally, "entrepreneur grannies"), which manages a small retail business selling children's games, clothing and shoes made by prisoners at the Alcalá de Guadaira jail in Seville.

=== Mayor of Madrid ===
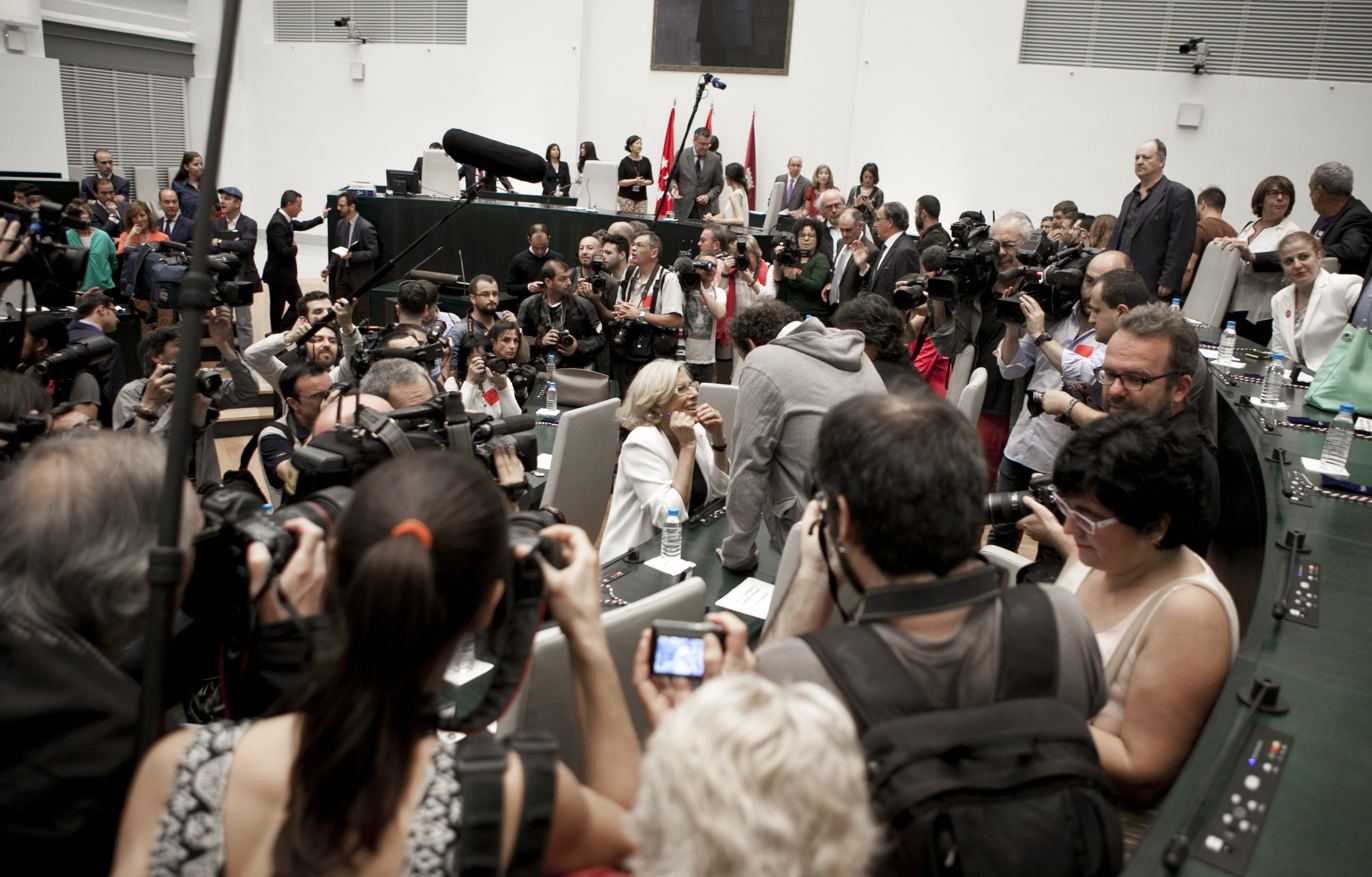
Carmena in the plenary chamber of the City Hall, the day she became Mayor.

Part of the so-called "mayors of change", Carmena headed Ahora Madrid's ticket in the Madrid local election held on 24 May 2015. After Ahora Madrid made a coalition deal with the PSOE, Carmena was elected as Mayor on 13 June 2015, obtaining the votes of 29 out of 57 councillors and thereby winning a narrow majority.

Carmena reduced Madrid's municipal debt by €5.6 billion (or 38%) in the first 18 months of her mayorship. In this same time period, Carmena also managed to increase social spending by 26%, which led to an investigation by the opposing People Party's Treasury minister in order to examine Madrid's compliance with Cristóbal Montoro's national spending regulations. This feud between the national Ministry and the municipal Department of Economy and Finance forced Carmena to sack Carlos Sánchez Mato from his position as councillor in December 2017. Also in the first half of her mandate, the ayuntamiento organised several public consultations in order to decide on issues, opening up public input on part of the municipal budget as well as on a project for the revitalisation of the Plaza de España. The council's executive board also changed 52 street and place names hanging over from the Francoist dictatorship which did not comply with the 2007 Law of Historical Memory.

Carmena ran for re-election in the 2019 municipal election, but stated that she would retire from the City Council should she not be re-elected as Mayor. In November 2018, the political platform for Más Madrid was unveiled, with Carmena at its centre. In the municipal election held on 26 May 2019, Más Madrid was the most-voted party – the first time since 1987 that the People's Party was not the most-voted party –, obtaining 19 seats in the plenary assembly, but on 15 June 2019, the People's Party's mayoral candidate José Luis Martínez-Almeida, with the support of Citizens and Vox, earned the vote of an absolute majority of councillors (29 out of 57 councillors) and was elected as Mayor. On 17 June 2019, Carmena resigned from her councillor seat.

=== Since June 2019 ===
In January 2021, she complained that, "We are infected with lies regarding reality. It is very difficult to develop correct policies for a deformed reality. One of the issues we must consider is how to combat the systematic lies that deform the social reality."

== Electoral history ==
Electoral history of Manuela Carmena
Election	List	Constituency	List position	Result
Spanish general election, 1977 (Congress of Deputies)	PCE	Madrid	23rd (out of 32)	Unelected
Madrid municipal election, 2015	Ahora Madrid	–	1st (out of 57)	Elected
Madrid municipal election, 2019	Más Madrid	–	1st (out of 57)	Elected

== Books ==
- — (1997). Crónica de un desorden: Notas para reinventar la Justicia. Madrid: Alianza Editorial.
- — (2014). Por qué las cosas pueden ser diferentes: Reflexiones de una jueza. Madrid: Clave Intelectual.
- — (2019). A los que vienen. Madrid: Aguilar. ISBN 978-84-03-51767-7.
- — (2020). Cuentos para soñar un mundo mejor. Madrid: Península.
- — (2021). La joven política. Madrid: Península.

== Decorations ==
- Great Cross of the Order of St. Raymond of Peñafort (2002)
- Great Cross of the Order of the Sun of Peru (2015)
- Great Cross of the Order of Merit (2018)
