= José Luis Martínez-Almeida =

Spanish politician (born 1975)

The Most Excellent José Luis Martínez-Almeida
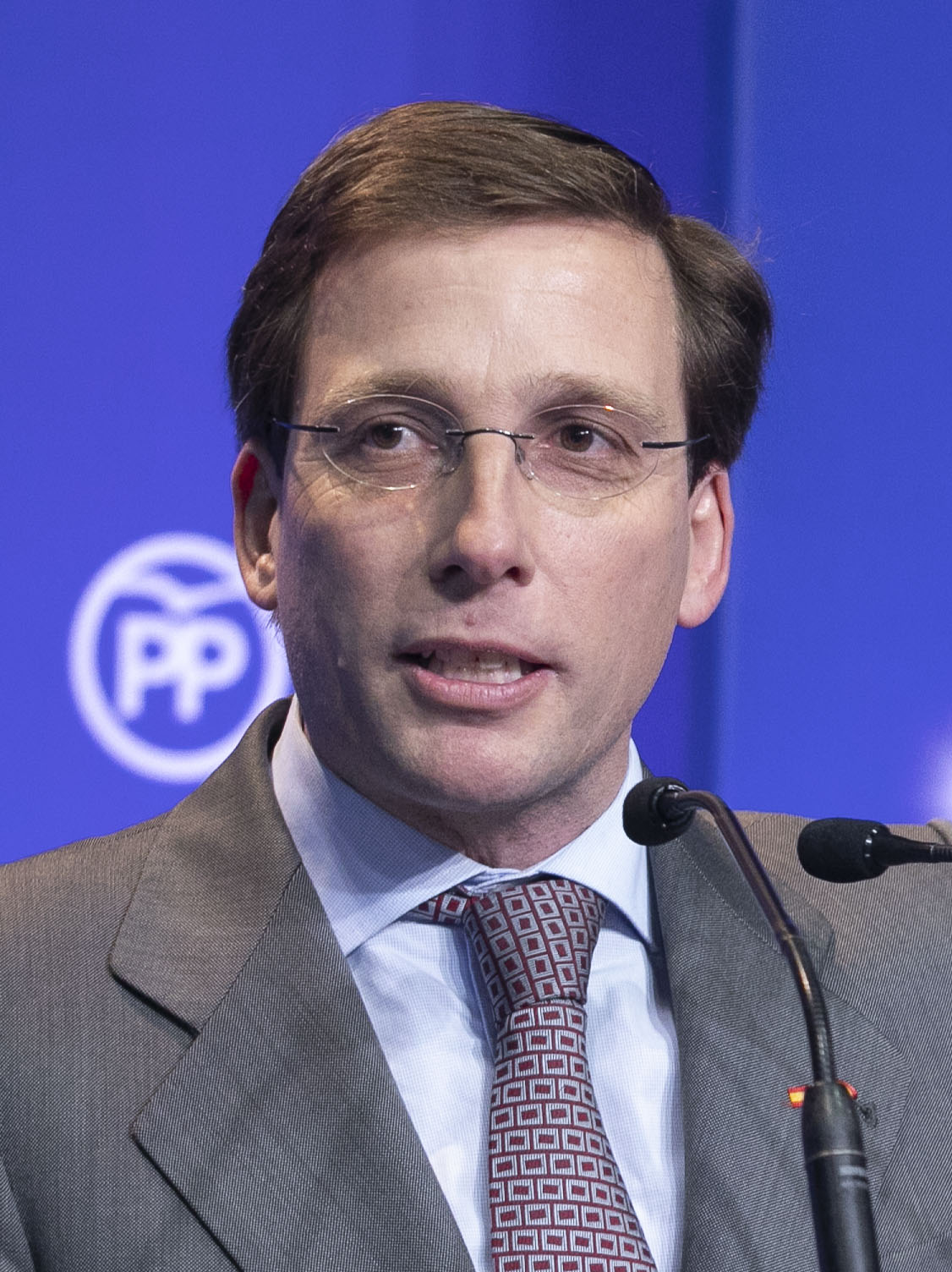
- Martínez-Almeida in 2019

Mayor of Madrid
- Incumbent
- Assumed office 15 June 2019
- Deputy: Begoña Villacís; Inma Sanz
- Preceded by: Manuela Carmena

National spokesperson of the People's Party
- In office 20 August 2020 – 22 February 2022
- Leader: Pablo Casado
- Preceded by: Office created
- Succeeded by: Borja Sémper

Member of the City Council of Madrid
- Incumbent
- Assumed office 13 June 2015

Personal details
- Born: José Luis Martínez-Almeida Navasqüés; 17 April 1975 (age 51) Madrid, Spain
- Party: People's Party
- Spouse: Teresa Urquijo (m. 2024)
- Children: 1
- Education: Comillas Pontifical University

José Luis Martínez-Almeida Navasqüés (born 17 April 1975) is a Spanish state lawyer and politician. A member of the People's Party (PP), he has been a member of the Madrid City Council since 2015 and has been Mayor of Madrid since 2019.

== Biography ==
Martínez-Almeida was born in Madrid on 17 April 1975. His grandfather Pablo Martínez-Almeida y Nacarino was a member of the Privy Council of the Count of Barcelona, he is the youngest of the six children of Rafael Martínez-Almeida y León y Castillo and Ángela Navasqüés Cobián. He studied at the Retamar School in Pozuelo de Alarcón, linked to the Opus Dei. Martínez-Almeida affiliated to the People's Party (PP) when he was 20 years old, and he earned a Licentiate degree in law at the ICADE (Comillas Pontifical University) in 1998. In 2001, he joined the State Lawyers Corps.

He served as Director-General for Historic Heritage of the Community of Madrid from 2007 to 2011. In 2011, Esperanza Aguirre, the region's premier, appointed him as Secretary of the Council of Government of the Community of Madrid. He left the regional government in 2013 in order to become a member of the General Secretariat and Council of state-owned enterprise SEPIDES (currently SEPI) as Secretary of the Law Division. He left this post in 2015.

Aguirre included Martínez-Almeida as a principal figure in the candidacy of PP for the 2015 Madrid municipal election and the later became municipal councillor. In 2017, as Aguirre resigned from her last offices following the detention of her political "dauphin" Ignacio González, Martínez-Almeida replaced her as Spokesperson of the PP's Municipal Group in the City Council. His interventions as leader of the opposition made him widely known.

In July 2018, he was appointed member of the National Executive Committee of the PP after the election of Pablo Casado as party leader.

In January 2019, he was designated candidate of the PP to be the next Mayor of Madrid.

In January 2024, he announced his engagement to Teresa Urquijo y Moreno, the great-granddaughter of Infante Alfonso, Duke of Calabria.

=== Mayor of Madrid ===
He ran first in the PP list for the 2019 Madrid City Council election. Martínez-Almeida lost the council election against Manuela Carmena, Más Madrid, but due to a coalition agreement among PP Popular Party, C's Citizens and Vox, he was invested as Mayor on 15 June 2019, during the opening session of the new municipal corporation.

During the campaign, the PP pledged to get rid of the star measure of the previous municipal administration: the low emission zone Madrid Central. As promised, on July 1, the City Council led by Martínez-Almeida suspended the system for three months by ceasing to fine infractions. Environmental groups such as Greenpeace cut roads in protest. However, a week later a court in Madrid restored the fines. After more than one year of legal dispute, in July 2020, the derogation of the measure was supported by a judicial sentence, but the municipal government maintained the fines.

During the COVID-19 pandemic in Spain, Martínez-Almeida garnered the support of all parties in the City Council. His performance gained him notoriety and recognition. After the first confinement, the City Council of Madrid was the first major administration to reach a transversal reconstruction plan.

In September 2021, Almeida's government banned the in-person participation of neighbors in the plenary meetings of the district councils.

He tested positive for COVID-19 on 21 December 2021 during the pandemic in Spain.

In April 2022, it came to light that his government was involved in a scandal for awarding several contracts to companies managed by aristocrat Luis Medina Abascal, son of Naty Abascal and the Duke of Feria; and his partner, Alberto Javier Luceño Cerón, two businessmen who mediated in the purchase of sanitary material with the Madrid City Council in March 2020, during the worst moment of the COVID-19 pandemic in Spain and a few days after the state of alarm was declared, with whom them both took millionaire commissions for various contracts, being investigated by the Anti-Corruption Prosecutor's Office.

== Personal life ==
On 7 April 2024, at the church of San Francisco de Borja in Madrid, Martínez-Almeida married Teresa Urquijo y Moreno, a granddaughter of Princess Teresa of Bourbon-Two Sicilies. They have a son, Lucas (b. 2025).

He is a fan of football club Atlético Madrid.

Political offices
| Preceded by Francisco Javier Hernández Martínez | Director-General for Historical Heritage of the Community of Madrid; 2007–2011 | Succeeded by Laura Rivera García de Leániz |
| Preceded by Manuela Carmena Castrillo | Mayor of Madrid; Since 2019 | Incumbent |
