= Álvaro Alcalá-Galiano y Osma =

19th-century Spanish writer

Marquis of Castel Bravo Álvaro Alcalá-Galiano y Osma
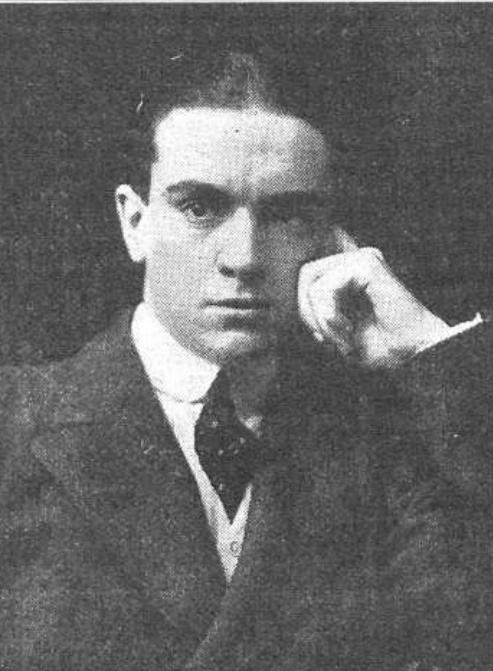
- Photograph by Christian Franzen (Mundo Gráfico, 1914)
- Born: April 29, 1886; Madrid
- Died: July 28, 1936 (aged 50); Vallecas
- Citizenship: Spanish
- Occupations: Journalist, writer, and historian
- Political party: Spanish Renovation
- Movement: Ateneo de Madrid
- Parents: Emilio Alcalá-Galiano (father); Ana de Osma y Zavala (mother)
- Honours: Legion of Honour (1919)

Álvaro Alcalá-Galiano y Osma (Madrid, 29 April 1886 – 28 July 1936) was a Spanish writer, literary critic, historian, and journalist, frequent contributor to newspaper ABC and magazine Acción Española. As a monarchist, he was influenced by Charles Maurras. While he was pro-Allied during the First World War, his writings later extolled Italian fascism and spread anti-Semitic conspiracy theories and a strong anti-communism sentiment. He was a member of Spanish Renovation during the Second Republic and was executed at the beginning of the civil war in the Republican zone due to his support for the coup and his fascist ideology.

He held the title of marquis of Castel Bravo.

== Biography ==
=== Family origins and early years ===
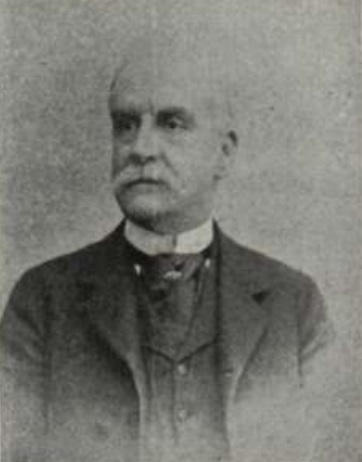
His father Emilio was ambassador in London and minister of state in 1875.

He was born in Madrid on 29 April 1886 as an heir to the County of Casa-Valencia. His father, Emilio Alcalá-Galiano had been minister of state and would later hold the post of Spanish ambassador to the United Kingdom. His mother was Ana de Osma y Zavala, a native of Lima, cousin of Guillermo de Osma y Scull, and a noblewoman of the Order of Queen Maria Luisa. The other children born to the marriage of the Counts of Casa Valencia were Consuelo, (Note: Queen's lady. Married to Jesús Bernaldo de Quirós. Grandmother of Carlos Espinosa de los Monteros y Bernaldo de Quirós and great-grandmother of Iván Espinosa de los Monteros y de Simón.) María Teresa, Juan, and Emilio. On his father's side, Álvaro was the great-grandson of Vicente Alcalá Galiano, who served as general treasurer during the War of Independence (1807–1814). Meanwhile, on his mother's side, he was the grandson of Joaquín José de Osma y Ramírez de Arellano, the Peruvian foreign minister.

Starting in 1915, he would develop a letter-writing relationship with his cousin, Peruvian nationalist José de la Riva-Agüero y Osma, marquis of Montealegre de Aulestia, whom he would have met in 1913. (Note: In his letters, he disagreed with his cousin about the First World War, as the latter argued that Germany, at the time, represented el empuje de juvenil de la conquista y el principio de orden y autoridad en lo político. (English: The youthful drive of conquest and the principle of order and authority in the political sphere.)) He was a member of the Ateneo de Madrid and also a fan of wrestling in his youth. Around 1915, he was living in the palace built by his parents, located at number 5 Paseo de la Castellana in Madrid.

=== Pro-Allied period ===
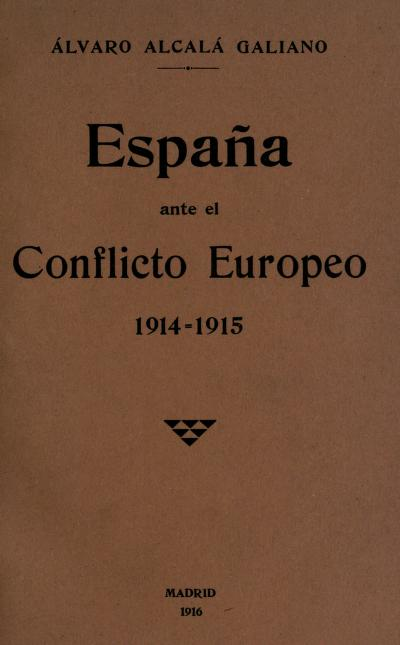
Front cover of España ante el conflicto europeo, 1914–1915, published in 1916.

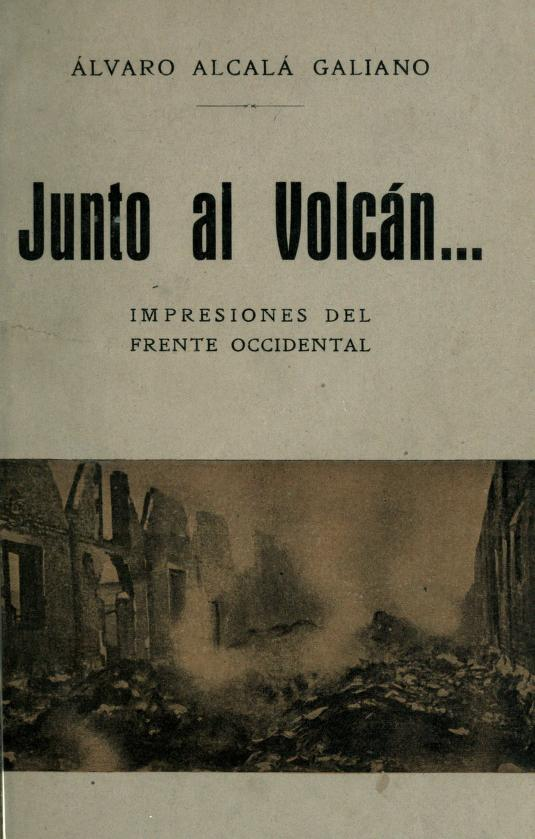
Front cover of Junto al Volcán: impresiones del frente occidental, published in 1917.

Alcalá-Galiano was a staunch defender of the Allied cause during the First World War —a rarity in Spanish aristocratic circles, where Germanophilia ran rampant. He authored four books on the conflict, published between 1915 and 1919. Around this time, he also wrote compilations of literary studies.

Apart from his inclination as a supporter of the Allies, the categorization of Alcalá-Galiano's ideologies during this period varies depending on the author. According to historian Maximiliano Fuentes Codera, he would have conceptualized the war at first in rigid terms as a conflict between the right and the left. Back then, according to historian Ignacio Peiró Martín, Alcalá-Galiano would have been un escritor cosmopolita, monárquico y liberal. (Note: English: A cosmopolitan, monarchist, and liberal writer) Meanwhile, historian Javier Moreno Luzón identifies his brand of opinion journalism during the conflict as that of an uncategorizable proaliado a fuer de maurrasiano. (Note: English: Pro-Allied [individual] by dint of his Maurrassisme) Alternatively, his contemporary Emilia Pardo Bazán, who reviewed several of his works, described him in 1915 as intelectual de sangre azul y conservador abolengo. (Note: English: [A] blue-blood intellectual with a conservative lineage) By royal decree of 23 May 1918, the nobility title of marquis of Castel Bravo del Rivero was reinstated for him and his descendants. (Note: In 1922, the name of the title was changed to the simpler Marquis of Castel Bravo.)

After the rise of Bolshevism in Russia, Alcalá-Galiano changed his geopolitical vision, replacing Mitteleuropa with Russia as the main focus of concern for Spain.

=== Maurrassisme and anti-Semitism ===
As an admirer of the political doctrine of French intellectual Charles Maurras—leader the so-called "integral nationalism"—Alcalá-Galiano criticized the Vatican for having turned its back on him. During the 1920s and from the pages of newspaper ABC, Alcalá-Galiano spread his anti-Semitic ideas stemming from Maurrassisme, as well as his favorable opinions on Italian fascism and viscerally anti-parliamentary positions. (Note: Regarding fascism, the following articles—all published in ABC—are worthy of note: La "reacción" contra la anarquía (8 November 1922); El fascismo redentor (7 March 1923); De la anarquía a la resurrección (16 March 1923); El triunfo de una dictadura (21 March 1923); Dictadura y revolución (2 June 1923); Ante el golpe de estado (22 September 1923); Renovación política de España. I. Un Gobierno que gobierna (30 September 1923); Italia y España (21 November 1923); La democracia contra el fascismo (10 July 1924); El ocaso de Europa, I (6 August 1924); El ocaso de Europa, II (13 August 1924); Crisis de la civilización (28 August 1924); El comunismo y la revolución (21 November 1924).) He became an advocate of repression against the "red threat" in the press, and by the start of the decade he was already adhering to the conspiracy theories of the extreme right and recalcitrant anti-communism. Moreover, he was an unconditional admirer of Benito Mussolini and, after the coup by Miguel Primo de Rivera in September 1923, he referred to the differences between both dictatorships, as follows:

En España al fin ha sonado la hora. No ha sido tal como hubiéramos deseado; es decir, un Mussolini español, un fascismo civil, ajeno a la política oficial, que ocupase repentinamente los ministerios, los ayuntamientos y las oficinas del Estado. Pero no había opción. España, como indiqué en estas columnas a principios del actual verano, se hallaba ante el siguiente dilema: o dictadura, o revolución. Por desgracia, a falta de dictador que anhelaba la parte sana del país, ha tenido que ser el elemento militar el encargado de dar realidad a los anhelos nacionales. (Note: English: In Spain, the time has finally come. It has not been as we would have wanted it to be; that is, a Spanish Mussolini, a civil fascism, far from official politics, which would suddenly occupy the ministries, the town halls, and the state offices. But there was no option. Spain, as I said in these columns at the start of this summer, was facing the following dilemma: either we have a dictatorship or a revolution. Unfortunately, in the absence of the dictator that the sane part of the country longed for, the military has had to be the one in charge of realizing the national aspirations.)

— Alcalá-Galiano (22 September 1923)

Alcalá-Galiano was a contributor to newspaper ABC and a sympathizer and collaborator of magazine Acción Española during the Second Republic, as well as a member of political party Spanish Renovation. Furthermore, he stood out as an antisemita de pluma, (Note: English: Anti-Semitic writer) since he published La caída de un trono in 1933—in which he blamed the fall of the Bourbon monarchy on a conspiración judeomasónica (Note: English: Judeo-Masonic conspiracy)—and in the pages of ABC, he also praised the anti-Semitic measures taken by Adolf Hitler in Germany. He would also insist on the idea of a Masonic infiltration in Spain during the Second Republic. After the failed Sanjurjada military coup in August 1932 and the resulting closure of Acción Española by the government, he was sent to the Cárcel Modelo prison for a while, along with other collaborators of the magazine.

In February 1934, disillusioned with the ups and downs in the evolution of the nascent fascist movement of Falange Española (FE) and unable to effectively exercise violence on the workers' movement, Alcalá-Galiano did not hesitate to refer to Spanish fascism—contrary to its European counterparts—as platónico. (Note: English: Platonic) Also, while meddling with the FE and coinciding with the burial of Falangist Matías Montero, he reproached it for its inaction in the face of the attacks it was being subjected to. He suggested that the FE should carry out a plan of indiscriminate violence. Moreover, amid the controversy, he maintained that:

Un fascismo teórico, sin la violencia como medio táctico, será lo que se quiera, pero no es fascismo. (Note: English: A theoretical fascism, without violence as a tactical means, is anything but fascism.)

— Alcalá-Galiano (ABC, 13 February 1934)

FE leader José Antonio Primo de Rivera would end up accusing Alcalá-Galiano of incitement to murder.

In July 1934, in reaction to Catalan nationalism and from the pages of ABC, Alcalá-Galiano would call on the creation of a patriotic league for the defense of unity in Spain. Later, in 1935, he took part in the strategy to discredit the CEDA, attempting to make it seem that this party had wasted time while in power, which had allowed the left to recover and get reorganized. In late 1935, he was appointed chairperson of the Spanish-English Committee, coinciding with the entry in the board of directors of Henry Chilton, the new British ambassador.

On the occasion of the elections of February 1936, Alcalá-Galiano stated that Spain was facing a dilemma: revolución o contrarrevolución, Patria o Antipatria. (Note: English: Either revolution or counterrevolution; either patriotism or anti-patriotism) Thus, he advocated for:

[L]a unión sagrada de todos los valores auténticamente nacionales frente a la formidable coalición de la Antipatria, dirigida por los agentes de la Internacional revolucionaria (...) para salvar la existencia misma de España (...) (Note: English: [T]he sacred union of all authentically national values against the formidable coalition of anti-patriotism led by the agents of the revolutionary International (...) in order to save the very existence of Spain itself.)

According to Alcalá-Galiano, it had all started with the Pact of San Sebastián, which had led to reparto y despojo de España entre masones, marxistas y separatistas.(...) (Note: English: The plundering of Spain among Freemasons, Marxists, and separatists) In turn, he said, this had led to four years of a Republic during which there had been:

[A]tropellos, crímenes, desastres políticos, económicos y sociales... huelgas, atracos y crímenes sociales a granel [coronados por] la revolución de octubre de 1934 con sus 2.500 muertos y sus millares de víctimas, cuyos culpables siguen vivos y algunos de ellos hasta en libertad. (Note: English: Abuse; crime; political, economic, and social debacles... strikes, muggings, and social crime in abundance [topped with] the Revolution of October 1934 with its 2,500 deaths and its thousands of victims, the culprits of which are still alive and some of them are even free.)

=== Death ===
At the beginning of the Civil War, Alcalá-Galiano was arrested at his home by members of checa number 1 of Radio Comunista and taken to Vallecas with his brother, the count of Romilla. They were both executed on 28 July 1936 after having been subjected to a summary trial, due to their fascist ideology.

== Works ==
- —— (1908) Impresiones de arte (prologue by Emilia Pardo Bazán)
- —— (1912) Del Ideal y de la Vida
- —— (1914) El Príncipe Iván
- —— (1915) La Verdad sobre la Guerra. Origen y aspectos del conflicto europeo (with translations into English and French)
- —— (1916) España ante el Conflicto Europeo, 1914–1915
- —— (1917) Junto al volcán: impresiones del frente occidental
- —— (1919) El fin de la tragedia: la Entente victoriosa y la España neutral
- —— (1921) Una voz... en el desierto
- —— (1926) Fuego y Cenizas
- —— (1928) Entre dos mundos, seguido de un ensayo sobre la decadencia de Europa
- —— (1933) La caída de un Trono
- —— (1934) Renovación Española ante la sociedad.

== Bibliography ==
- Álvarez Chillida, Gonzalo (2002). El Antisemitismo en España. La imagen del judío (1812–2002) (in Spanish). Madrid: Marcial Pons Ediciones de Historia. ISBN 84-95379-44-9.
- Araujo-Costa, Luis (10 April 1926). "Fuego y Cenizas". La Época (Madrid) (in Spanish). Madrid. ISSN 2254-559X.
- Badía Collados, Javier (1983). "Acción Española: una aproximación histórico-ideológica" (PDF). Verbo (217–218). Madrid: Fundación Speiro: 827–847. ISSN 0210-4784. Archived from the original (PDF) on 15 May 2017.
- Artola Blanco, Miguel (2013). Las clases altas en la sociedad de masas. Capital, poder y estatus: Madrid, 1900–1950 (PhD thesis) (in Spanish). Thesis advisor: Pro Ruiz, Juan. Madrid: Autonomous University of Madrid. hdl:10486/661872.
- — (2014). "Las clases altas en la sociedad de masas. Capital, poder y estatus: Madrid, 1900–1950". Journal of Iberoamerican Population Studies (in Spanish). 32 (2): 21–50. ISSN 1696-702X.
- Bullón de Mendoza, Alfonso (2000). "Aristócratas muertos en la Guerra Civil Española". Aportes (in Spanish). 15 (44): 77–106. ISSN 0213-5868. OCLC 15262886.
- Conde y Díaz-Rubín, José Ignacio; Sanchiz Ruiz, Javier (2012). "Notas". Historia genealógica de los títulos y dignidades nobiliarias en Nueva España y México. Volumen II. Casa de Austria (siglos XVI-XVII) (PDF) (in Spanish). Mexico City: National Autonomous University of Mexico. pp. 187–252. ISBN 978-607-02-3522-1. Archived from the original (PDF) on 15 August 2019.
- Dewaele Valderrábano, Hélène (2009). "La culture politique et historique des droites autoritaires espagnoles de 1931 a 1939". Bulletin d'histoire contemporaine de l'Espagne (in French) (44). Université de Provence: 163–178. ISSN 0987-4135.
- Fuentes Codera, Maximiliano (2013). "Germanófilos y neutralistas: proyectos tradicionalistas y regeneracionistas para España (1914–1918)" (PDF). Ayer: Revista de Historia Contemporánea (in Spanish). 91 (3). Marcial Pons Ediciones de Historia: 63–92. ISSN 1134-2277.
- Fuentes Codera, Maximiliano (2014). España en la Primera Guerra Mundial: Una movilización cultural (in Spanish). Madrid: Ediciones Akal. ISBN 978-84-460-4026-2.
- García, Hugo (2005). "Historia de un mito político: el peligro comunista en el discurso de las derechas españolas (1918–1936)". Historia Social (in Spanish) (51). Valencia, Spain: Fundación Instituto de Historia Social: 3–20. ISSN 0214-2570. JSTOR 40340928.
- Gil Pecharromán, Julio (1984). "El alfonsismo radical en las elecciones de febrero de 1936". Revista de Estudios Políticos (in Spanish) (42). Madrid: Centre for Political and Constitutional Studies: 101–136. ISSN 0048-7694. OCLC 1589742.
- Gómez Acuña, Luis (1999). "Ideología y política en José de la Riva-Agüero y Osma. Breves apuntes e hipótesis de estudios". Histórica (in Spanish). 23 (1). Lima: Pontifical Catholic University of Peru: 79–109. doi:10.18800/historica.199901.003. ISSN 0252-8894.
- Gómez de Baquero, Eduardo "Andrenio" (22 October 1921). "Dos libros de periodistas". La Época (Madrid) (in Spanish). Madrid. ISSN 2254-559X.
- González Calleja, Eduardo (2011). Contrarrevolucionarios. Radicalización violenta de las derechas durante la Segunda República, 1931–1936 (in Spanish). Madrid: Alianza Editorial. ISBN 978-84-206-6455-2.
- González Cuevas, Pedro Carlos (1990). "La recepción del pensamiento maurrasiano en España (1914–1930)". Espacio, Tiempo y Forma. Serie V, Historia Contemporánea (in Spanish). 1 (3). Madrid: National University of Distance Education: 343–356. doi:10.5944/etfv.3-1.1990.2716 (inactive 11 July 2025). ISSN 1130-0124.
- — (1996). ""Habitus" e ideología. El pensamiento político de Francisco Moreno y Herrera, Marqués de la Eliseda". Cuadernos de Historia Contemporánea (in Spanish). 18. Madrid: Servicio de Publicaciones (Universidad Complutense de Madrid): 83–114. ISSN 0214-400X. Archived from the original on 15 August 2016.
- — (2000). "La recepción del pensamiento conservador radical europeo en España (1913–1930)". Ayer: Revista de Historia Contemporánea (in Spanish). 38 (2). Madrid: Marcial Pons Ediciones de Historia: 211–231. ISSN 1134-2277.
- — (2001a). "Las tradiciones ideológicas de la extrema derecha española". Hispania. Revista Española de Historia (in Spanish). 61 (207). Madrid: Spanish National Research Council: 99–141. doi:10.3989/hispania.2001.v61.i207.308. ISSN 0018-2141.
- — (2001b). "Antonio Goicoechea. Político y doctrinario monárquico". Historia y política: Ideas, procesos y movimientos sociales (in Spanish) (6). Madrid: Centre for Political and Constitutional Studies: 161–189. ISSN 1575-0361.
- — (2011). "8. La trayectoria de un recién llegado. El fracaso del fascismo español.". In del Rey, Fernando (ed.). Palabras como puños: la intransigencia política en la Segunda República española (in Spanish). Madrid: Tecnos Editorial. pp. 480–520. ISBN 978-84-309-5217-5.
- Grégorio, Pierre-Paul (2000). "1933-1936 : Falange Española dans ABC de Madrid". Cahiers d'études romanes (in French) (4). Centre Aixois d'Études Romanes (CAER): 115–154. doi:10.4000/etudesromanes.3547. ISSN 2271-1465.
- Hernández Barral, José Miguel (2014). "La nobleza española ante la Gran Guerra: ¿el Gran Cambiazo?". Rubrica Contemporanea (in Spanish). 3 (6). Autonomous University of Barcelona: 47–56. doi:10.5565/rev/rubrica.67. ISSN 2014-5748.
- Jiménez Torres, David (2013). "Journalists at the Front: Ramiro de Maeztu, Inglaterra en armas and Spanish Intellectuals during the First World War". Bulletin of Spanish Studies: Hispanic Studies and Researches on Spain, Portugal and Latin America. 90 (8). Glasgow: University of Glasgow: 1291–1311. doi:10.1080/14753820.2013.847158. hdl:20.500.12020/545. ISSN 1475-3820.
- Luis Martín, Francisco de (1990). "Aproximación al liberalismo monárquico en la Segunda República Española". Studia Historica. Historia Contemporánea. (in Spanish). 8. Salamanca: University of Salamanca: 121–141. ISSN 0213-2087.
- — (1994). ""Hermanos o extranjeros": la postura de ABC ante el nacionalismo catalán durante la Segunda República". Studia Historica. Historia Contemporánea. (in Spanish). 12. Salamanca: University of Salamanca: 129–156. ISSN 0213-2087.
- Martín Gijón, Mario (2010). "Nazismo y antisemitismo en la literatura falangista. En torno a poemas de la Alemania eterna (1940)". Vanderbilt e-Journal of Luso-Hispanic Studies (in Spanish). 6. Nashville, Tennessee: Vanderbilt University: 63–84. ISSN 1547-5743.
- Martín Sánchez, Isabel (1996). "La visión de la masonería desde ABC durante el primer bienio de la II República Española. Vol. 2". In Ferrer Benimeli, José Antonio (ed.). La masonería en la España del siglo XX (in Spanish). University of Castilla–La Mancha. pp. 655–670. ISBN 84-89492-47-6.
- Martínez Ruiz, José "Azorín" (16 March 1915). "Un francófilo". ABC (in Spanish). Madrid. pp. 4–5.
- Meaker, Gerald H. (1988). "A Civil War of Words: The Ideological Impact of the First World War on Spain, 1914–18". In Schmitt, Hans A. (ed.). Neutral Europe Between War and Revolution, 1917-23. Charlottesville, Virginia: University of Virginia Press. pp. 1–65. ISBN 0-8139-1153-2.
- Medina, Jaume (1995). L'anticatalanisme del diari ABC (1916–1936) (in Catalan). Barcelona: Publicacions de l'Abadia de Montserrat. ISBN 84-7826-606-2.
- Moreno Luzón, Javier (23 February 2015). "Una guerra no declarada". Revista de Libros (in Spanish). ISSN 1137-2249. OCLC 885841796. Archived from the original on 5 March 2016.
- Morodo Leoncio, Raúl (1978). "La formalización de Acción Española". Revista de Estudios Políticos (in Spanish) (1). Centre for Political and Constitutional Studies: 29–48. ISSN 0048-7694. OCLC 1589742.
- Narbona, Rafael (17 April 2015). "José Antonio Primo de Rivera: mi fascista favorito". Revista de Libros (in Spanish). ISSN 1137-2249. OCLC 885841796.
- Nieto, Ernesto (22 May 1913). "La personalidad literaria de Don Álvaro Alcalá Galiano". Nuevo Mundo (in Spanish). p. 17. ISSN 1699-8677. OCLC 733283152.
- Peiró Martín, Ignacio (2015). "La gran guerra de los historiadores: la encuesta francesa de Alfred Morel-Fatio sobre la neutralidad, la beligerancia y el pacifismo de los intelectuales españoles" (PDF). In Gamarra Chopo, Yolanda; Fernández Liesa, Carlos R. (eds.). Los orígenes modernos del Derecho internacional. Estudios conmemorativos del centenario de la Primera Guerra Mundial (in Spanish). Zaragoza: Institución Fernando el Católico. pp. 71–126. ISBN 978-84-9911-368-5. Archived from the original (PDF) on 2017-05-15.
- Peloille, Manuelle (2009). "Recensement des articles d'opinion sur l'Italie fasciste, dans les quotidiens espagnols : ABC, El Debate, La Época, Heraldo de Madrid, La Libertad et El Sol, du 25 octobre 1922 au 28 février 1929". Cahiers de civilisation espagnole contemporaine (De 1808 au temps présent). Histoire politique, économique, sociale et culturelle (in French). 5 (5). Angers: University of Angers. doi:10.4000/ccec.3168. ISSN 1957-7761.
- Ramírez Jerez, Pablo (2015). "Emilio Alcalá-Galiano y Valencia, conde de Casa Valencia: Semblanza bio-bibliográfica". Hidalguía (in Spanish). 62 (370). Madrid: Real Asociación de Hidalgos de España: 753–770. ISSN 0018-1285.
- Ribagorda, Álvaro (2008). "El Comité Hispano-Inglés y la Sociedad de Cursos y Conferencias de la Residencia de Estudiantes (1923–1936)". Cuadernos de Historia Contemporánea (in Spanish). 30. Madrid: Servicio de Publicaciones (Universidad Complutense de Madrid): 273–291. ISSN 0214-400X. OCLC 803141148.
- Rivera, Víctor Samuel (2009). "El Marqués de Montealegre de Aulestia: biografía española de un nacionalista peruano". Escritos (in Spanish). 17 (39). Medellín: Pontifical Bolivarian University: 410–449. doi:10.18566/escr. ISSN 0120-1263. Archived from the original on 7 August 2016.
- Rojas Juárez, José Rafael; de Andrés Díaz, Rosana (2015). Ministerio del Interior. Dos siglos de historia (in Spanish). Madrid: Ministry of the Interior (Spain). ISBN 978-84-8150-316-6. Archived from the original on 24 March 2016.
- Royo Villanova, Antonio (26 February 1933). "La caída de un trono". ABC (in Spanish). Madrid. p. 24.
- Rozenberg, Danielle (2010). La España contemporánea y la cuestión judía: retejiendo los hilos de la memoria y de la historia (in Spanish). Madrid: Centro Sefarad-Israel. ISBN 978-84-92820-20-7.
- Ruiz-Ocaña Dueñas, Eduardo (2014–2015). "La Primera Guerra Mundial contada por Emilia Pardo Bazán en La Ilustración Artística". La Tribuna: Cadernos de Estudos da Casa Museo Emilia Pardo Bazán (in Spanish) (10). Royal Galician Academy: 29–50. ISSN 1697-0810.
- Saz Campos, Ismael (2003). España contra España: los nacionalismos franquistas (in Spanish). Madrid: Marcial Pons Historia. ISBN 84-95379-57-0.
- Seco Serrano, Carlos (1986). "El cerco de la monarquía. La ruptura de los partidos dinásticos con Alfonso XIII durante la dictadura de Primo de Rivera". Boletín de la Real Academia de la Historia (in Spanish). 183 (2). Madrid: Royal Academy of History: 161–270. ISSN 0034-0626. OCLC 1460620.
- Tenreiro, Ramón María (January 1916). "España ante el conflicto europeo (1914-1915), por Álvaro Alcalá Galiano, Madrid, 1916". La Lectura. Revista de Ciencias y Artes. (in Spanish). XVI (181). Madrid: 422–425. ISSN 2171-0384.
- Viñas, Ángel (2019). ¿Quién quiso la guerra civil? Historia de una conspiración (in Spanish). Barcelona: Editorial Crítica. ISBN 978-84-9199-090-1.
