= 2019 Madrilenian regional election =

Election in the Spanish region of Madrid

- 26 May 2019

All 132 seats in the Assembly of Madrid 67 seats needed for a majority
- Opinion polls
- Registered: 5,059,252 ▲3.7%
- Turnout: 3,251,386 (64.3%) ▼1.4 pp
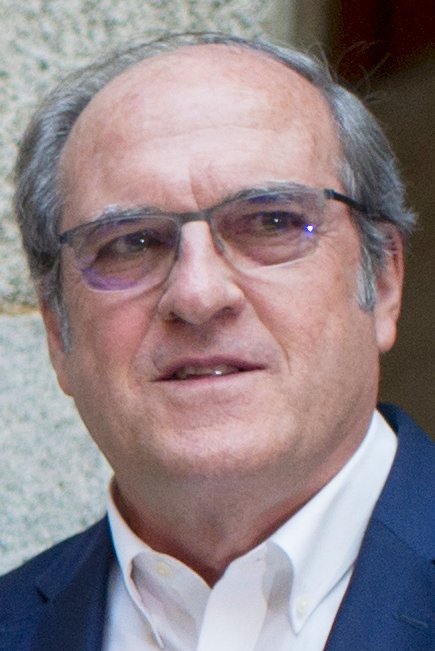

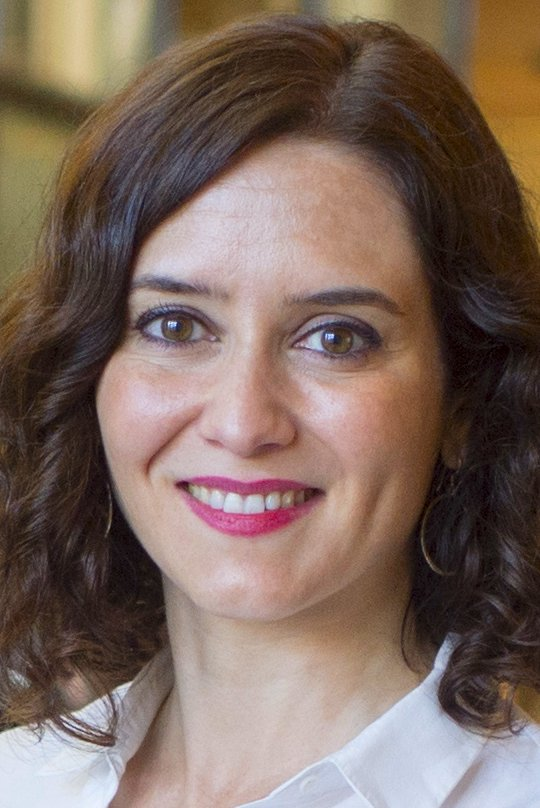

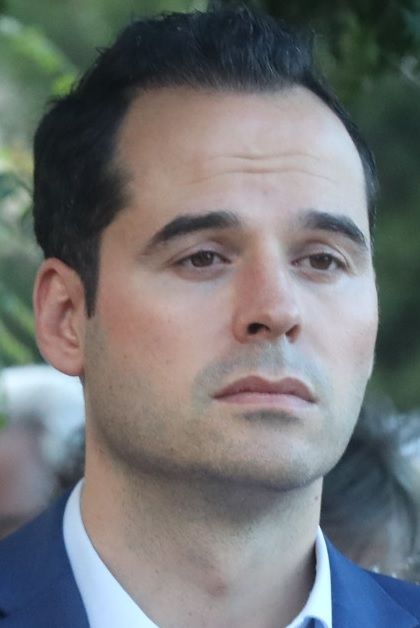

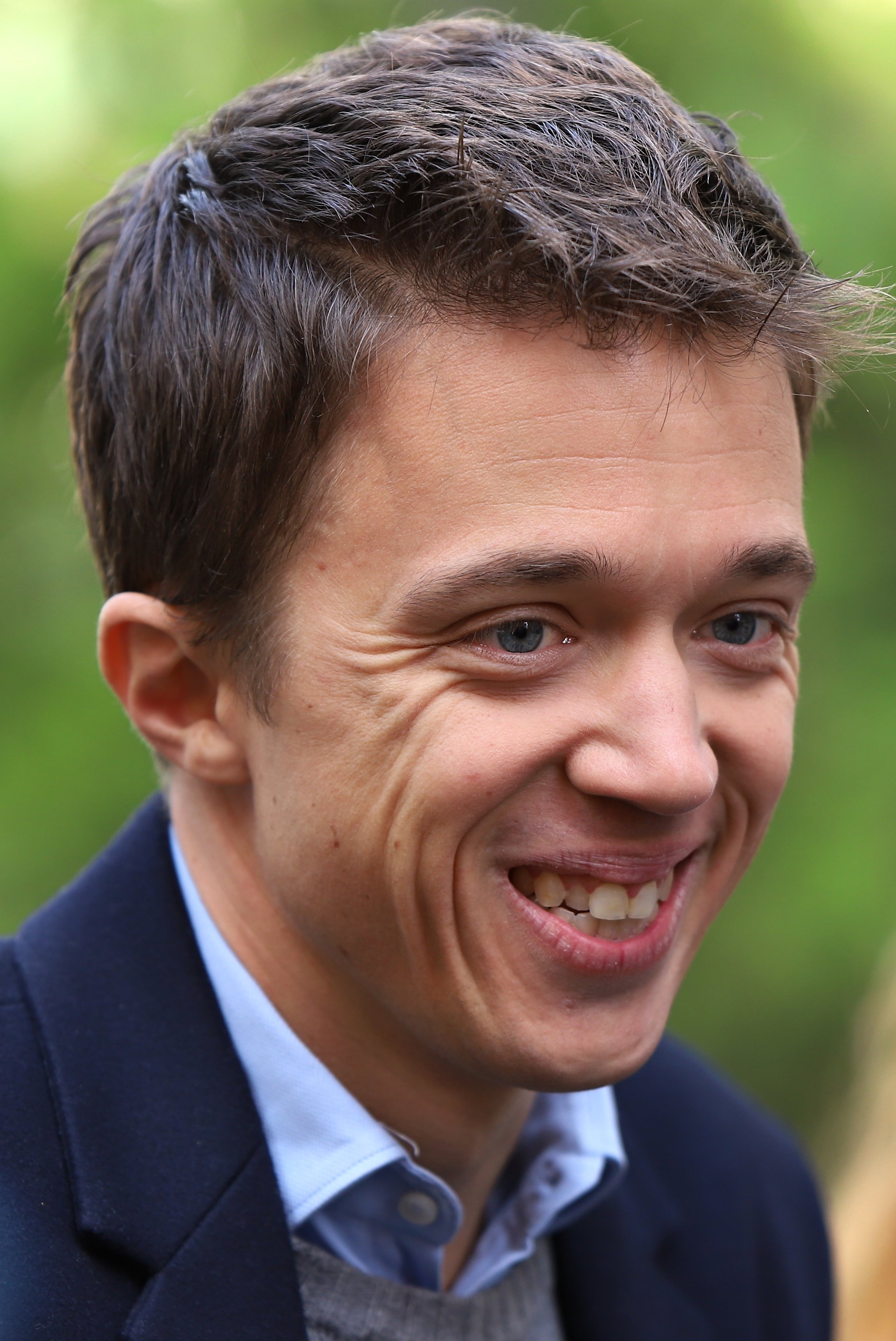

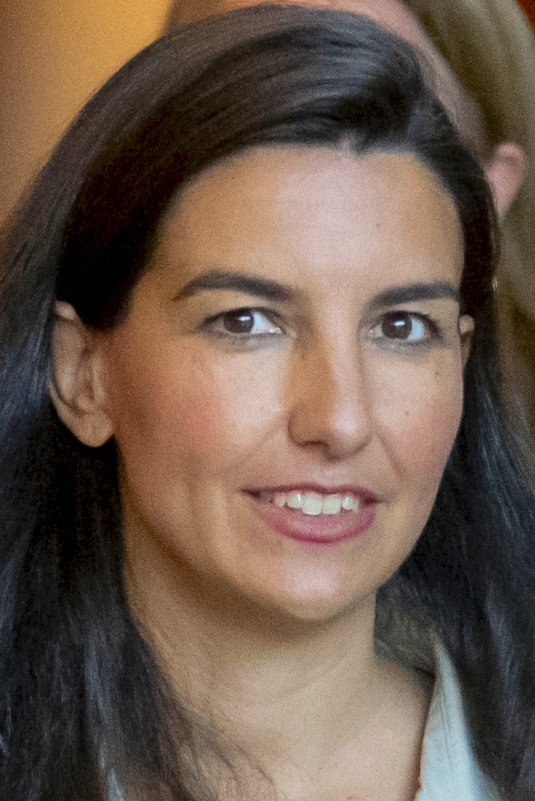

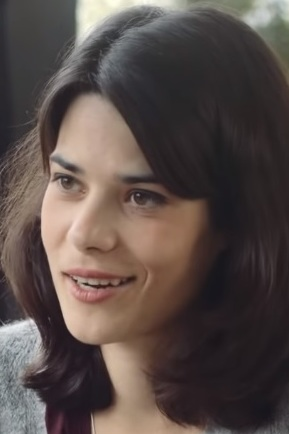
	First party	Second party	Third party
Leader	Ángel Gabilondo	Isabel Díaz Ayuso	Ignacio Aguado
Party	PSOE	PP	Cs
Leader since	21 February 2015	13 January 2019	2 March 2015
Last election	37 seats, 25.4%	48 seats, 33.1%	17 seats, 12.2%
Seats won	37	30	26
Seat change	0	▼18	▲9
Popular vote	884,218	719,852	629,940
Percentage	27.3%	22.2%	19.5%
Swing	▲1.9 pp	▼10.9 pp	▲7.3 pp
	Fourth party	Fifth party	Sixth party
Leader	Íñigo Errejón	Rocío Monasterio	Isabel Serra
Party	Más Madrid	Vox	Podemos–IU
Leader since	17 January 2019	18 April 2019	18 March 2019
Last election	Did not contest	0 seats, 1.2%	27 seats, 22.8% (Note: Results for Podemos (18.6%, 27 seats) and IUCM–LV (4.2%, 0 seats) in the 2015 election.)
Seats won	20	12	7
Seat change	▲20	▲12	▼20
Popular vote	475,672	287,667	181,231
Percentage	14.7%	8.9%	5.6%
Swing	New party	▲7.7 pp	▼17.2 pp
President before election
Pedro Rollán (acting)
PP
President after election
Isabel Díaz Ayuso
PP

A regional election was held in the Community of Madrid on 26 May 2019 to elect the 11th Assembly of the autonomous community. All 132 seats in the Assembly were up for election. It was held concurrently with regional elections in eleven other autonomous communities and local elections all across Spain, as well as the 2019 European Parliament election.

As a result of the election, the Spanish Socialist Workers' Party (PSOE) emerged as the largest political party in a Madrilenian regional election for the first time since 1987, but failed short of securing a majority together with Íñigo Errejón's Más Madrid and Unidas Podemos, the latter of which barely surpassed the 5% threshold to win seats in the Assembly. Instead, a right-of-centre alliance between the People's Party (PP), Citizens (Cs) and far-right Vox was able to muster a majority to form a government, which resulted in the election of PP candidate Isabel Díaz Ayuso as new regional president.

== Background ==
On 21 March 2018, it transpired that President Cristina Cifuentes could have obtained a master's degree in the King Juan Carlos University through fraudulent means. What initially started off as a suspicion that she could have faked her CV, developed into a major scandal after a series of irregularities in the obtaining of the academic title were revealed, as well as the subsequent attempt from both the university and the regional government to cover up the scandal through document forgery. Preliminary probing revealed evidence of possible criminal offenses that were subsequently put under investigation of the judiciary, questioning Cifuentes's continuity as regional premier. After the release of a 2011 video showing her being detained in a supermarket for shoplifting, Cifuentes resigned on 25 April 2018. She was succeeded by her deputy, Ángel Garrido, who was sworn into office on 21 May. Cifuentes's scandal joined many others in a long list of corruption cases beleaguering the ruling People's Party (PP) in Spain that ended up with Prime Minister Mariano Rajoy's downfall on 1 June through a vote of no confidence in the Congress of Deputies.

On 17 January 2019, Podemos suffered a major split after it was announced that Carmena and Íñigo Errejón, Podemos candidate for regional president and one of Podemos founders, had agreed to launch a joint platform to run at the regional election. Podemos leader Pablo Iglesias announced later that day that he no longer considered Errejón as the party's candidate in the region for placing himself "outside Podemos", and that Podemos and IU would contest the regional election on their own even if that meant to compete against Más Madrid and, therefore, against Errejón. Podemos leaders also urged Errejón to resign his Congress seat, considering his move as "deceitful" and "a betrayal" to the party. On 21 January, Errejón resigned his seat, but still called for Podemos, IU and Equo to join the Más Madrid platform. On 25 January, Ramón Espinar, the regional Podemos secretary-general, announced his resignation and his farewell from politics, allegedly after the party's national leadership deprived Espinar's regional branch of any autonomy to attempt negotiations with Errejón's platform for either running in a joint list or agreeing on a coordinated political action.

On 11 April, president Ángel Garrido resigned his post over eligibility issues to join the PP's list to the 2019 European Parliament election, being replaced by Pedro Rollán in the interim. Two weeks later, and four days before that month's general election, Garrido announced his break up from the PP, instead joining Cs's lists for the next regional election.

== Overview ==
Under the 1983 Statute of Autonomy, the Assembly of Madrid was the unicameral legislature of the homonymous autonomous community, having legislative power in devolved matters, as well as the ability to grant or withdraw confidence from a regional president. The electoral and procedural rules were supplemented by national law provisions.

=== Date ===
The term of the Assembly of Madrid expired four years after the date of its previous ordinary election, with election day being fixed for the fourth Sunday of May every four years. The election decree was required to be issued no later than 54 days before the scheduled election date and published on the following day in the Official Gazette of the Community of Madrid (BOCM). The previous election was held on 24 May 2015, setting the date for election day on the fourth Sunday of May four years later, which was 26 May 2019.

The regional president had the prerogative to dissolve the Assembly of Madrid at any given time and call a snap election, provided that no motion of no confidence was in process, no nationwide election had been called and that dissolution did not occur either during the first legislative session or during the last year of parliament before its planned expiration, nor before one year after a previous one. In the event of an investiture process failing to elect a regional president within a two-month period from the first ballot, the Assembly was to be automatically dissolved and a fresh election called, which was to be held on the first Sunday 54 days after the call. Any snap election held as a result of these circumstances did not alter the date of the chamber's next ordinary election, with elected lawmakers serving the remainder of its original four-year term.

The election to the Assembly of Madrid was officially called on 2 April 2019 with the publication of the corresponding decree in the BOCM, setting election day for 26 May and scheduling for the chamber to reconvene on 11 June.

=== Electoral system ===
Voting for the Assembly was based on universal suffrage, comprising all Spanish nationals over 18 years of age, registered in the Community of Madrid and with full political rights, provided that they had not been deprived of the right to vote by a final sentence. (Note: Amendments in 2018 granted the right to vote to those legally incapacitated.) Additionally, non-resident citizens were required to apply for voting, a system known as "begged" voting (Spanish: Voto rogado).

The Assembly of Madrid had one seat per 50,000 inhabitants or fraction above 25,000. All were elected in a single multi-member constituency—corresponding to the autonomous community's territory—using the D'Hondt method and closed-list proportional voting, with a five percent-threshold of valid votes (including blank ballots) regionally. As a result of the aforementioned allocation, the Assembly was entitled to 132 seats, based on the official population figures resulting from the latest revision of the municipal register (as of 1 January 2018).

The law did not provide for by-elections to fill vacant seats; instead, any vacancies arising after the proclamation of candidates and during the legislative term were filled by the next candidates on the party lists or, when required, by designated substitutes.

=== Outgoing parliament ===
The table below shows the composition of the parliamentary groups in the chamber at the time of the election call.

Parliamentary composition in April 2019
Groups	Parties	Legislators	
Groups	Parties	Seats	Total
People's Parliamentary Group	PP	48	48
Socialist Parliamentary Group	PSOE	37	37
We Can Parliamentary Group	Podemos	27	27
Citizens's Parliamentary Group	Cs	17	17

== Parties and candidates ==
The electoral law allowed for parties and federations registered in the interior ministry, alliances and groupings of electors to present lists of candidates. Parties and federations intending to form an alliance were required to inform the relevant electoral commission within 10 days of the election call, whereas groupings of electors needed to secure the signature of at least 0.5 percent of the electorate in the Community of Madrid, disallowing electors from signing for more than one list. Additionally, a balanced composition of men and women was required in the electoral lists, so that candidates of either sex made up at least 40 percent of the total composition.

Below is a list of the main parties and alliances which contested the election:

Candidacy	Parties and alliances	Leading candidate	Ideology	Previous result		Gov.	Ref.
Candidacy	Parties and alliances	Leading candidate	Ideology	Vote %	Seats	Gov.	Ref.
PP	List: People's Party (PP)	Isabel Díaz Ayuso	Conservatism; Christian democracy	33.1%	48	Yes	
PSOE	List: Spanish Socialist Workers' Party (PSOE)	Ángel Gabilondo	Social democracy	25.4%	37	No	
Podemos–IU	List: We Can (Podemos); United Left–Madrid (IU–M) – Communist Party of Madrid (PCM) – The Dawn Marxist Organization (La Aurora (OM)) – Republican Left (IR) – Feminist Party of Spain (PFE); Anticapitalists Madrid (Anticapitalistas Madrid)	Isabel Serra	Left-wing populism Direct democracy Democratic socialism	22.8%	27	No	
Cs	List: Citizens–Party of the Citizenry (Cs)	Ignacio Aguado	Liberalism	12.2%	17	No	
Vox	List: Vox (Vox)	Rocío Monasterio	Right-wing populism Ultranationalism; National conservatism	1.2%	0	No	
Más Madrid	List: More Madrid (Más Madrid); Equo (Equo)	Íñigo Errejón	Progressivism; Participatory democracy Green politics	Did not contest		No	

== Campaign ==
=== Debates ===
2019 Madrilenian regional election debates
Date	Organizer(s)	Moderator(s)	P Present (Note: Denotes a main invitee attending the event.) A Absent invitee NI Not invited							
Date	Organizer(s)	Moderator(s)	PP	PSOE	UP	Cs	Vox	MM	Audience	Ref.
19 May	Telemadrid	María Rey; Jon Ariztimuño	P Ayuso	P Gabilondo	P Serra	P Aguado	P Monasterio	NI	6.7% (160,000)	
20 May	Cadena SER	Javier Casal; Lucía González	A	P Gabilondo	P Serra	P Aguado	P Monasterio	P Errejón	—	

== Opinion polls ==
The tables below list opinion polling results in reverse chronological order, showing the most recent first and using the dates when the survey fieldwork was done, as opposed to the date of publication. Where the fieldwork dates are unknown, the date of publication is given instead. The highest percentage figure in each polling survey is displayed with its background shaded in the leading party's colour. If a tie ensues, this is applied to the figures with the highest percentages. The "Lead" column on the right shows the percentage-point difference between the parties with the highest percentages in a poll.

=== Graphical summary ===
Local regression trend line of poll results from 24 May 2015 to 26 May 2019, with each line corresponding to a political party.

=== Voting intention estimates ===
The table below lists weighted voting intention estimates. Refusals are generally excluded from the party vote percentages, while question wording and the treatment of "don't know" responses and those not intending to vote may vary between polling organisations. When available, seat projections determined by the polling organisations are displayed below (or in place of) the percentages in a smaller font; 67 seats were required for an absolute majority in the Assembly of Madrid (65 in the 2015 election).

Color key:

Poll conducted after legal ban on opinion polls Exit poll

Polling firm/Commissioner	Fieldwork date	Sample size	Turnout	PP	PSOE	Podemos	Cs	IU–Madrid	Vox	PACMA	Unidas Podemos	Más Madrid	Lead
2019 regional election	26 May 2019	—N/a	64.3	22.2; 30	27.3; 37	(Note: Within Unidas Podemos.)	19.4; 26		8.9; 12	0.8; 0	5.6; 7	14.7; 20	5.1
Sigma Dos/Telemadrid	26 May 2019	10,800	?	19.4; 26/27	27.5; 37/39		18.2; 24/25		9.1; 12	–	10.1; 13/14	13.0; 17/18	8.1
ElectoPanel/Electomanía	22–23 May 2019	?	?	21.1; 28	26.7; 36		20.3; 27		8.7; 11	–	8.9; 12	13.5; 18	5.6
ElectoPanel/Electomanía	21–22 May 2019	?	?	21.3; 29	26.5; 36		20.3; 27		8.5; 11	–	8.9; 12	12.6; 17	5.2
ElectoPanel/Electomanía	20–21 May 2019	?	?	21.4; 29	26.6; 36		19.7; 27		8.8; 12	–	9.0; 12	12.3; 16	5.2
ElectoPanel/Electomanía	19–20 May 2019	?	?	21.3; 29	26.7; 37		19.6; 27		8.5; 11	–	9.2; 12	12.0; 16	5.4
SocioMétrica/El Español	19 May 2019	1,250	?	21.4; 29/30	26.2; 35/36		18.1; 25/26		7.5; 10/11	–	11.5; 14/15	13.0; 16/17	4.8
NC Report/La Razón	19 May 2019	?	?	21.5; 29/30	27.2; 36/37		? 26/27		? 12/13	–	? 14/15	? 13/14	5.7
GAD3/ABC	19 May 2019	?	?	21.9; 29/31	29.0; 39/41	8.8; 11/13	17.8; 24/26	0.8; 0	8.8; 11/13	1.0; 0	–	9.5; 12/14	7.1
ElectoPanel/Electomanía	16–19 May 2019	?	?	21.4; 29	27.0; 37		19.9; 27		8.6; 12	–	9.9; 13	10.4; 14	5.6
Top Position	16–18 May 2019	1,600	?	21.4; 29	27.8; 38		18.4; 25		10.7; 14	–	9.6; 13	9.4; 13	6.4
IMOP/El Confidencial	14–17 May 2019	1,400	72.5	21.2; 29	28.3; 38/39		19.2; 26/27		7.3; 10	–	9.0; 12	12.1; 16/17	7.1
Demoscopia Servicios/ESdiario	14–17 May 2019	1,200	?	21.3; 28	27.4; 37		21.0; 28		7.4; 9	–	12.0; 16	10.8; 14	6.1
ElectoPanel/Electomanía	13–16 May 2019	?	?	21.4; 29	26.6; 37		20.2; 28		8.6; 11	–	10.3; 14	9.5; 13	5.2
KeyData/Público	15 May 2019	?	?	19.0; 26	23.7; 33		20.6; 29		9.0; 12	–	13.0; 17	11.6; 15	3.1
DYM/El Independiente	10–15 May 2019	802	?	20.2; 26/27	28.3; 38/39		17.3; 23/24		11.0; 15	–	8.7; 11/12	12.7; 17/18	8.1
Metroscopia/Henneo	10–14 May 2019	1,400	76	21.0; 28	27.6; 38		19.8; 27		10.5; 14	–	8.2; 11	10.3; 14	6.6
Sigma Dos/El Mundo	10–13 May 2019	900	?	21.7; 29/31	29.7; 41/42		18.1; 24/25		7.5; 10	–	9.4; 12/13	10.1; 13/14	8.0
ElectoPanel/Electomanía	10–13 May 2019	?	?	20.5; 28	26.7; 37		21.3; 29		9.7; 13	–	10.5; 14	8.1; 11	5.4
NC Report/La Razón	12 May 2019	?	?	21.7; 29/30	27.0; 36/37		19.4; 26/27		9.1; 13/14	–	10.8; 14/15	9.8; 12/13	5.3
ElectoPanel/Electomanía	7–10 May 2019	?	?	19.6; 27	27.8; 38		21.4; 29		10.1; 13	–	10.2; 14	8.3; 11	6.4
40dB/El País	3–9 May 2019	1,200	?	19.8; 27	24.2; 33		18.4; 25		8.7; 11/12	–	7.7; 10	18.8; 25/26	4.4
ElectoPanel/Electomanía	4–7 May 2019	?	?	19.0; 26	26.9; 37		22.3; 31		10.2; 14	–	10.0; 13	8.6; 11	4.6
ElectoPanel/Electomanía	29 Apr–4 May 2019	?	?	18.8; 26	25.9; 37		22.8; 31		10.1; 13	–	10.5; 14	8.0; 11	3.1
April 2019 general election	28 Apr 2019	—N/a	75.5	18.6 (25)	27.3 (37)		20.9 (29)		13.9 (19)	1.3 (0)	16.2 (22)	–	6.4
CIS	21 Mar–23 Apr 2019	2,210	?	22.9; 29/33	26.1; 33/38		16.4; 21/24		5.7; 6/8	–	13.0; 17/19	12.8; 16/18	3.2
ElectoPanel/Electomanía	31 Mar–7 Apr 2019	?	?	17.8; 26	28.9; 42	6.5; 9	14.9; 21	3.1; 0	15.0; 22	–	–	8.7; 12	11.1
InvyMark/Telemadrid	3 Apr 2019	800	?	22.0; 31	24.7; 34	7.5; 10	14.9; 21	1.8; 0	17.2; 24	–	–	8.6; 12	2.7
ElectoPanel/Electomanía	24–31 Mar 2019	?	?	17.2; 25	29.0; 42	6.3; 9	15.3; 22	3.1; 0	15.4; 22	–	–	8.5; 12	11.8
ElectoPanel/Electomanía	17–24 Mar 2019	?	?	17.3; 24	30.2; 43	7.7; 10	14.8; 21	2.6; 0	15.9; 22	–	–	8.6; 12	12.9
PP	23 Mar 2019	?	?	? 30	? 38	? 10	? 22	–	? 20	–	–	? 12	?
ElectoPanel/Electomanía	10–17 Mar 2019	?	?	17.2; 24	28.7; 40	7.8; 11	13.7; 19	–	18.9; 26	–	–	8.5; 12	9.8
InvyMark/Telemadrid	12 Mar 2019	800	?	22.6; 31	23.7; 33	9.3; 13	16.3; 23	2.1; 0	13.7; 19	–	–	9.2; 13	1.1
PP	10 Mar 2019	?	?	? 30	? 36	? 11	? 23	–	? 20	–	–	? 12	?
ElectoPanel/Electomanía	3–10 Mar 2019	?	?	16.9; 24	28.3; 40	8.0; 11	14.3; 20	–	18.7; 26	–	–	8.2; 11	9.6
ElectoPanel/Electomanía	22 Feb–3 Mar 2019	?	?	16.5; 23	28.5; 40	8.1; 11	14.5; 20	–	18.9; 27	–	–	7.9; 11	9.6
InvyMark/Telemadrid	15 Feb 2019	800	?	22.0; 31	21.8; 30	8.6; 12	18.9; 26	2.1; 0	14.2; 20	–	–	9.5; 13	0.2
PP	11 Feb 2019	?	?	21.9; 29	22.4; 30	9.5; 12	19.6; 26	5.2; 7	9.5; 12	–	–	11.8; 16	0.5
NC Report/La Razón	29 Jan–2 Feb 2019	900	64.8	21.3; 31	20.4; 30	7.4; 10	18.9; 27	4.4; 0	10.4; 15	–	–	13.2; 19	0.9
Celeste-Tel/eldiario.es	23–30 Jan 2019	800	?	20.8; 29	21.4; 30	9.0; 12	19.2; 27	5.3; 7	8.4; 12	–	–	10.5; 15	0.6
InvyMark/Telemadrid	29 Jan 2019	800	?	21.8; 30	21.9; 30		19.4; 27		13.5; 18	–	9.3; 13	10.5; 14	0.1
ElectoPanel/Electomanía	17 Jan 2019	500	?	16.6; 24	25.2; 38		17.6; 26		17.9; 26	0.9; 0	4.7; 0	12.5; 18	7.3
InvyMark/Telemadrid	14–15 Jan 2019	800	70	21.6; 30	22.3; 31		21.4; 29		12.2; 17	–	18.1; 25	–	0.7
PP	10 Dec 2018	?	?	? 28	? 31		? 30		? 17	–	? 23	–	?
ElectoPanel/Electomanía	9–10 Dec 2018	700	?	17.0; 24	23.2; 33		21.1; 30		14.4; 20	1.6; 0	18.1; 25	–	2.1
ElectoPanel/Electomanía	1–8 Nov 2018	700	?	20.9; 29/30	26.2; 36/38		24.1; 33/35		4.9; 0/6	0.8; 0	18.3; 25/26	–	2.1
SyM Consulting	3–4 May 2018	1,436	65.1	23.4; 33/34	25.7; 36/37	15.6; 22	26.1; 37	4.0; 0	–	–	–	–	0.4
SocioMétrica/El Español	26–30 Apr 2018	1,200	?	20.6; 29	20.7; 29	18.8; 27	30.8; 44	–	4.6; 0	0.8; 0	–	–	10.1
NC Report/La Razón	23–28 Apr 2018	900	62.6	23.9; 36	20.9; 31	16.2; 24	25.4; 38	4.4; 0	2.8; 0	3.2; 0	–	–	1.5
InvyMark/laSexta	23–27 Apr 2018	?	?	24.4; 34	24.5; 34	16.5; 23	26.9; 38	–	–	–	–	–	2.4
GAD3/ABC	18–27 Apr 2018	1,061	?	25.3; 36	25.5; 36	12.9; 18	27.6; 39	1.4; 0	–	–	–	–	2.1
Sigma Dos/El Mundo	24–26 Apr 2018	?	?	22.6; 31/32	22.2; 31/32	16.8; 23/24	30.4; 42/43	3.6; 0	–	–	–	–	7.8
Metroscopia/El País	18–25 Apr 2018	2,600	70	17.7; 25	22.5; 33	15.9; 23	32.9; 48	–	–	–	–	–	10.4
Celeste-Tel/eldiario.es	16–19 Apr 2018	600	64.3	24.3; 34	23.9; 34	17.6; 25	25.7; 36	4.7; 0	–	–	–	–	1.4
Cs	6–10 Apr 2018	700	?	22.3; 31	23.5; 32	17.3; 23	26.5; 36	5.5; 7	–	–	–	–	3.0
Equipo MEG/PSOE	6–10 Apr 2018	1,805	?	26.3; 36	27.5; 37	14.5; 20	26.8; 36	2.2; 0	–	–	–	–	0.7
SocioMétrica/El Español	23–30 Mar 2018	800	?	23.5; 33	18.8; 26	16.6; 23	28.6; 40	5.1; 7	3.4; 0	–	–	–	5.1
SyM Consulting	5–7 Mar 2018	1,408	67.5	31.5; 43/45	25.2; 36	15.8; 22/23	18.0; 25/26	4.1; 0	–	–	–	–	6.3
Equipo MEG/PSOE	5–9 Jan 2018	?	?	31.3; 44	24.9; 35	15.7; 22	19.5; 28	3.9; 0	–	–	–	–	6.4
NC Report/La Razón	26–29 Apr 2017	1,000	59.3	35.9; 51	24.6; 34	18.1; 26	13.1; 18	–	–	–	–	–	10.3
InvyMark/laSexta	26–27 Apr 2017	?	?	30.9; 44	25.8; 36	21.3; 30	13.5; 19	–	–	–	–	–	5.1
Metroscopia/El País (Note: "¿Qué pasaría si se celebrasen elecciones autonómicas en Madrid?". Metroscopia (in Spanish). 4 May 2017.)	24–26 Apr 2017	1,200	72	25.7; 36	19.7; 27	24.9; 35	22.6; 31	2.1; 0	–	–	–	–	0.8
2016 general election	26 Jun 2016	—N/a	70.8	38.2 (51)	19.6 (26)		17.8 (24)		0.5 (0)	1.1 (0)	21.3 (28)	–	16.9
2015 general election	20 Dec 2015	—N/a	74.1	33.4 (45)	17.8 (24)	20.9 (28)	18.8 (25)	5.3 (7)	0.6 (0)	0.8 (0)	–	–	12.5
2015 regional election	24 May 2015	—N/a	65.7	33.1; 48	25.4; 37	18.6; 27	12.2; 17	4.2; 0	1.2; 0	1.0; 0	–	–	7.7

=== Voting preferences ===
The table below lists raw, unweighted voting preferences.

Polling firm/Commissioner	Fieldwork date	Sample size	PP	PSOE	Podemos	Cs	IU–Madrid	Vox	Unidas Podemos	Más Madrid	Question	X mark	Lead
2019 regional election (Note: Does not include non-resident citizens.)	26 May 2019	—N/a	15.1	18.5		13.2		6.0	3.8	9.9	—N/a	31.9	3.4
40dB/El País	3–9 May 2019	1,200	10.1	18.2		12.0		5.9	6.3	18.3	21.5	4.1	0.1
April 2019 general election	28 Apr 2019	—N/a	14.8	21.6		16.6		11.0	12.8	–	—N/a	20.2	5.0
CIS	21 Mar–23 Apr 2019	2,210	13.1	17.4		8.0		3.1	7.7	8.3	33.8	6.6	4.3
Metroscopia/El País	18–25 Apr 2018	2,600	13.5	17.7	12.3	23.4	–	–	–	–	–	–	5.7
Metroscopia/El País	24–26 Apr 2017	1,200	19.8	15.9	17.6	16.5	–	–	–	–	23.9		2.2
2016 general election	26 Jun 2016	—N/a	28.2	14.5		13.1		0.4	15.7	–	—N/a	25.7	12.5
2015 general election	20 Dec 2015	—N/a	25.9	13.8	16.1	14.5	4.1	0.5	–	–	—N/a	22.2	9.8
2015 regional election	24 May 2015	—N/a	22.6	17.4	12.7	8.3	2.8	0.8	–	–	—N/a	31.1	5.2

=== Preferred President ===
The table below lists opinion polling on leader preferences to become president of the Community of Madrid.

Polling firm/Commissioner	Fieldwork date	Sample size										Other/ None/ Not care	Question	Lead
Polling firm/Commissioner	Fieldwork date	Sample size	Cifuentes PP	Ayuso PP	Gabilondo PSOE	López Podemos	Errejón Podemos/ Más Madrid	Aguado Cs	Montero IU–M	Monasterio Vox	Serra UP	Other/ None/ Not care	Question	Lead
IMOP/El Confidencial	14–17 May 2019	1,400	–	12.1	26.6	–	17.8	10.9	–	3.6	3.6	25.4		8.8
SocioMétrica/El Español	23–30 Mar 2018	800	21.0	–	20.0	2.4	10.5	18.0	4.1	–	–	24.0		1.0

== Results ==
=== Overall ===
← Summary of the 26 May 2019 Assembly of Madrid election results →
Parties and alliances	Popular vote			Seats	
Parties and alliances	Votes	%	±pp	Total	+/−
Spanish Socialist Workers' Party (PSOE)	884,218	27.31	+1.88	37	±0
People's Party (PP)	719,852	22.23	−10.85	30	−18
Citizens–Party of the Citizenry (Cs)	629,940	19.46	+7.31	26	+9
More Madrid (Más Madrid)	475,672	14.69	New	20	+20
Vox (Vox)	287,667	8.88	+7.70	12	+12
United We Can–United Left–Stand Up Madrid (Podemos–IU)^{1}	181,231	5.60	−17.20	7	−20
Animalist Party Against Mistreatment of Animals (PACMA)	24,446	0.76	−0.26	0	±0
Union, Progress and Democracy (UPyD)	4,057	0.13	−1.91	0	±0
For a Fairer World (PUM+J)	3,178	0.10	New	0	±0
Union for Leganés (ULEG)	2,984	0.09	−0.08	0	±0
Communist Party of the Workers of Spain (PCTE)	2,610	0.08	New	0	±0
Spanish Phalanx of the CNSO (FE–JONS)	2,217	0.07	−0.10	0	±0
Castilian Party–Commoners' Land: Pact (PCAS–TC–Pacto)	1,794	0.06	±0.00	0	±0
Humanist Party (PH)	1,727	0.05	−0.06	0	±0
Libertarian Party (P–LIB)	1,246	0.04	−0.02	0	±0
Blank ballots	15,020	0.46	−0.64		
Total	3,237,859			132	+3
Valid votes	3,237,859	99.58	+0.55		
Invalid votes	13,527	0.42	−0.55		
Votes cast / turnout	3,251,386	64.27	−1.42		
Abstentions	1,807,866	35.73	+1.42		
Registered voters	5,059,252				
Sources
Footnotes: ^{1} United We Can–United Left–Stand Up Madrid results are compared to the combined totals of We Can and United Left of the Community of Madrid–The Greens in the 2015 election.

Popular vote
PSOE	27.31%
PP	22.23%
Cs	19.46%
Más Madrid	14.69%
Vox	8.88%
Podemos–IU	5.60%
Others	1.37%
Blank ballots	0.46%

Seats
PSOE	28.03%
PP	22.73%
Cs	19.70%
Más Madrid	15.15%
Vox	9.09%
Podemos–IU	5.30%

=== Elected legislators ===
The following table lists the elected legislators sorted by order of election:

Elected legislators
#	Name	List
1	Ángel Gabilondo Pujol	PSOE
2	Isabel Natividad Díaz Ayuso	PP
3	Ignacio Aguado Crespo	Cs
4	Íñigo Errejón Galván	Más Madrid
5	Pilar Llop Cuenca	PSOE
6	David Pérez García	PP
7	César Zafra Hernández	Cs
8	José Manuel Rodríguez Uribes	PSOE
9	Rocío Monasterio San Martín	Vox
10	Ana Camins Martínez	PP
11	Clara Serra Sánchez	Más Madrid
12	María Llanos Castellanos Garijo ^{(es)}	PSOE
13	Esther Ruiz Fernández	Cs
14	Isabel Serra Sánchez	Podemos–IU
15	María Eugenia Carballedo Berlanga	PP
16	Juan Miguel Hernández León ^{(es)}	PSOE
17	Diego Figuera Álvarez	Más Madrid
18	Javier Luengo Vicente	Cs
19	Pilar Sánchez Acera ^{(es)}	PSOE
20	Pedro Manuel Rollán Ojeda	PP
21	José María Marco Tobarra	Vox
22	José Manuel Freire Campo ^{(es)}	PSOE
23	Eva Bailén Fernández	Cs
24	Alfonso Carlos Serrano Sánchez-Capuchino	PP
25	Alicia Gómez Benítez	Más Madrid
26	María Carmen Barahona Prol	PSOE
27	Juan Trinidad Martos ^{(es)}	Cs
28	Carlos Izquierdo Torres ^{(es)}	PP
29	Borja Luis Cabezón Royo ^{(es)}	PSOE
30	Jorge Arturo Cutillas Cordón ^{(es)}	Vox
31	Héctor Tejero Franco ^{(es)}	Más Madrid
32	Soledad Sánchez Maroto	Podemos–IU
33	María Yolanda Ibarrola de la Fuente	PP
34	Araceli Gómez García	Cs
35	Purificación Causapié Lopesino ^{(es)}	PSOE
36	Francisco Tomás-Valiente Lanuza	PSOE
37	Alicia Sánchez-Camacho Pérez	PP
38	Tania Sánchez Melero	Más Madrid
39	Luis Pacheco Torres	Cs
40	Lorena Morales Porro ^{(es)}	PSOE
41	David Erguido Cano	PP
42	Ana María Cuartero Lorenzo	Vox
43	Alberto Reyero Zubiri ^{(es)}	Cs
44	Enrique Rico García-Hierro	PSOE
45	Alejandro Sánchez Pérez ^{(es)}	Más Madrid
46	Enrique Matías Ossorio Crespo	PP
47	Matilde Isabel Díaz Ojeda	PSOE
48	Carlota Santiago Camacho	Cs
49	Beatriz Gimeno Reinoso	Podemos–IU
50	María Paloma Adrados Gautier	PP
51	Alodia Pérez Muñoz	Más Madrid
52	Juan José Moreno Navarro ^{(ca)}	PSOE
53	Íñigo Henríquez de Luna Losada ^{(es)}	Vox
54	Enrique Veloso Lozano	Cs
55	Cristina González Álvarez	PSOE
56	Daniel Portero de la Torre	PP
57	Pablo Gómez Perpiñá ^{(es)}	Más Madrid
58	Ana Isabel García García	Cs
59	José Luis García Sánchez	PSOE
60	Regina Otaola Muguerza ^{(es)}	PP
61	Isabel Aymerich D'Olhaberriague	PSOE
62	Ángel Garrido García	Cs
63	Diego Sanjuanbenito Bonal	PP
64	Mariano Calabuig Martínez	Vox
65	Mónica García Gómez	Más Madrid
66	José Carmelo Cepeda García de León	PSOE
67	Jacinto Morano González	Podemos–IU
68	Jaime Miguel de los Santos González	PP
69	Tamara Pardo Blázquez	Cs
70	Hana Jalloul Muro	PSOE
71	Jorge Moruno Danzi ^{(es)}	Más Madrid
72	Almudena Negro Konrad	PP
73	Fernando Fernández Lara	PSOE
74	Tomás Marcos Arias	Cs
75	Alicia Verónica Rubio Calle	Vox
76	Sonia Conejero Palero	PSOE
77	Pedro Muñoz Abrines	PP
78	Jazmín Beirak Ulanosky ^{(es)}	Más Madrid
79	Sergio Brabezo Carballo	Cs
80	Miguel Luis Arranz Sánchez	PSOE
81	María Carmen Castell Díaz	PP
82	Emy Fernández-Luna Abellán	Cs
83	María Encarnación Moya Nieto	PSOE
84	Eduardo Fernández Rubiño	Más Madrid
85	Francisco Javier Cañadas Martín	Podemos–IU
86	Eduardo Raboso García-Baquero	PP
87	Pablo Gutiérrez de Cabiedes Hidalgo de Caviedes	Vox
88	Javier Guardiola Arévalo	PSOE
89	Roberto Núñez Sánchez ^{(es)}	Cs
90	Jorge Rodrigo Domínguez	PP
91	María Carmen Mena Romero	PSOE
92	María Pastor Valdés	Más Madrid
93	Miguel Díaz Martín	Cs
94	Modesto Nolla Estrada ^{(ca)}	PSOE
95	María Nadia Álvarez Padilla ^{(ca)}	PP
96	María Yobana Carril Antelo	Vox
97	Emilio Delgado Orgaz ^{(es)}	Más Madrid
98	Marta Bernardo Llorente	PSOE
99	Marta Marbán de Frutos	Cs
100	Álvaro Moraga Valiente	PP
101	Agustín Vinagre Alcázar	PSOE
102	Vanessa Lillo Gómez	Podemos–IU
103	José María Arribas del Barrio	PP
104	Juan Rubio Ruiz	Cs
105	María Acín Carrera	Más Madrid
106	María Carmen López Ruiz	PSOE
107	María Yolanda Estrada Madrid	PP
108	Javier Pérez Gallardo	Vox
109	Victoria Alonso Márquez	Cs
110	Diego Cruz Torrijos	PSOE
111	Hugo Martínez Abarca ^{(es)}	Más Madrid
112	María Luisa Mercado Merino	PSOE
113	Carlos Díaz-Pache Gosende	PP
114	Ricardo Megías Morales	Cs
115	Rafael Gómez Montoya ^{(es)}	PSOE
116	Rocío Albert López-Ibor ^{(es)}	PP
117	Clara Ramas San Miguel	Más Madrid
118	Roberto Hernández Blázquez	Cs
119	Jaime María de Berenguer de Santiago	Vox
120	Carla Delgado Gómez	PSOE
121	Carolina Alonso Alonso	Podemos–IU
122	José Enrique Núñez Guijarro	PP
123	Nicolás Rodríguez García	PSOE
124	Pilar Liébana Soto	Cs
125	Santiago Eduardo Gutiérrez Benito	Más Madrid
126	María Dolores Navarro Ruiz	PP
127	Macarena Elvira Rubio	PSOE
128	Ana Rodríguez Durán	Cs
129	José Antonio Sánchez Serrano	PP
130	José Ángel Gómez-Chamorro Torres	PSOE
131	Gador Pilar Joya Verde	Vox
132	Raquel Huerta Bravo	Más Madrid

== Aftermath ==
=== Government formation ===
Investiture; Nomination of Isabel Díaz Ayuso (PP)
Ballot →	14 August 2019
Required majority →	67 out of 132
Yes: • PP (30); • Cs (26); • Vox (12)	68 / 132
No: • PSOE (37); • Más Madrid (20); • Podemos–IU (7)	64 / 132
Abstentions	0 / 132
Absentees	0 / 132

Isabel Díaz Ayuso's administration represented several historical firsts for the Community of Madrid: it was the first time that the region was run by a coalition government—Ayuso's own conservative People's Party (PP) and the center-right Citizens (Cs)—and it was the first time that the far-right, represented by Vox, propped up a regional executive in the Community. A similar governing arrangement was set up in the southern regions of Andalusia and Murcia.

== Bibliography ==
- Ley Orgánica 3/1983, de 25 de febrero, de Estatuto de Autonomía de la Comunidad de Madrid (Organic Law 3/1983). Official State Gazette (in Spanish). 25 February 1983 [version as of 17 July 2010]. BOE-A-1983-6317.
- Ley Orgánica 5/1985, de 19 de junio, del Régimen Electoral General (Organic Law 5/1985). Official State Gazette (in Spanish). 19 June 1985 [version as of 6 March 2019]. BOE-A-1985-11672.
- Ley 11/1986, de 16 de diciembre, Electoral de la Comunidad de Madrid (Law 11/1986). Official State Gazette (in Spanish). 16 December 1986 [version as of 29 December 2006]. BOE-A-1987-4255.
- Ley 5/1990, de 17 de mayo, reguladora de la facultad de disolución de la Asamblea de Madrid por el Presidente de la Comunidad (Law 5/1990). Official State Gazette (in Spanish). 17 May 1990 [version as of 29 May 1990]. BOE-A-1987-4255.
- Decreto 10/2019, de 1 de abril, del Presidente de la Comunidad de Madrid, por el que se convocan elecciones a la Asamblea de Madrid (PDF) (Decree 10/2019). Official Gazette of the Community of Madrid (in Spanish). 1 April 2019. BOCM-20190402-1.
