= Círculo de Empresarios =

Spanish non-profit organization

- Purpose: Free enterprise research, dissemination and promotion
- Headquarters: Madrid
- Region served: Spain
- Services: Think tank
- Chairman: Juan María Nin
- Website: https://circulodeempresarios.org/en/

Círculo de Empresarios (founded in Madrid on 31 March 1977) is a Spanish non-profit organisation dedicated to the study, dissemination and promotion of free enterprise and the role of the entrepreneur in the creation of wealth. It also aims to contribute to the economic and social debate in Spain and to promote entrepreneurship.

== History ==
The historical background of its creation goes back to the Asociación para el Estudio y Acción Empresarial, promoted in November 1976 by the minister José María López de Letona. He brought together a group of 50 personalities and encouraged them to create an association that would defend, among other freedoms, the freedom of business. The CEOE (Spanish Confederation of Business Organisations), promoted by Carlos Ferrer y Salat, brought together the other associations promoted by businessmen to defend their interests.

Founded as an association in 1977, at the beginning of the Spanish transition and shortly after the signing of the Pactos de la Moncloa, the Circulo brought together a hundred leading businessmen from large and medium-sized Spanish companies to contribute to the economic debate from a business perspective.

Círculo de Empresarios celebrated its 25th anniversary in 2002. The occasion was used to consider the role of entrepreneurship and Círculo de Empresarios itself throughout the years. Carlos Rodríguez Braun, Professor of the History of Economic Thought, used a chronological-thematic methodology to analyse the proposals made at the time on the labour market, the reform of the welfare state, the situation of the Autonomous Communities and budgetary balance, some of which were subsequently adopted by both conservative and socialist governments.

Like the corporate organisation CEOE, the Círculo has been a defender of business people's vision in the various political and economic phases from the transition to the economic crisis of 2008.

In 2024, Juan María Nin Génova was elected president, replacing Manuel Pérez-Sala Gozalo.

== Development ==
They followed the model of the US Business Roundtable, advised by McKinsey. Politically and economically independent, the Circulo has served as a think-tank and promoter of liberal ideas. This is done through a fourfold approach: publications, meetings, action programmes that involve different sectors of Spanish society, and regular awards.

It has contributed to political and economic debate by publishing numerous economic studies and providing timely analyses of the prevailing socio-economic situation.

Since 2014, they have awarded the Premio Reino de España a la Trayectoria Empresarial (Kingdom of Spain Award for Business Trajectory) with the support of the Royal Household and the collaboration of Círculo de Economía and Círculo de Empresarios Vascos. In 2014, the award went to Enrique de Sendagorta (Grupo Sener) and in 2015 to José Ferrer Sala (Freixenet).

== Publications ==
The Círculo de Empresarios publishes a large number of regular and monographic studies. The bulletins "Así está...la Economía" and "Así está...la Empresa" are published monthly. A quarterly report is published every three months and the Círculo's annual report is published every year, and institutional statements, infographics and reports on all aspects of economic activity.

Since 2014 and once a year, Círculo de Empresarios, Círculo de Economía and Círculo de Empresarios Vascos have promoted the "Barómetro de los Círculos", named from 2019, 'Encuesta de los Círculos'. It provides up-to-date information on the strengths of the Spanish economy and its structural imbalances and shortcomings. The survey develops five aspects: market dynamics, basic resources (physical infrastructure, education and innovation), labour and financial markets, business dynamism and the contribution of public administrations.

In September 2022, Círculo de Empresarios launched a new sustainability observatory to monitor companies' social, environmental and governance policies. The study is being carried out in collaboration with the consulting firm EY. In 2024, given the electoral challenges in Europe and the US, the Círculo believes that legislation on sustainability has no reverse gear, although there are different speeds.

== Reino de España Award ==
The Reino de España Award for Business Trajectory has been granted annually since 2014. The Nominations Committee submits the proposals to the nine-member jury, made up of relevant personalities from Spanish society.

Calls	Year	Winners	Jury presided by
I Edition	2014	Enrique de Sendagorta (Grupo Sener)	Marcelino Oreja
II Edition	2015	José Ferrer Sala (Freixenet)	Marcelino Oreja
III Edition	2016	José Antolín Toledano (Grupo Antolín)	Marcelino Oreja
IV Edition	2017	Mariano Puig Planas (Puig Group)	Antonio Garrigues Walker
V Editio	2018	Plácido Arango (Grupo Vips)	Antonio Garrigues
VI Eición	2019	Franciso Martínez-Cosentino (Cosentino Group)	Carme Riera
VII Edition	2022	Gabriel Escarrer Juliá (Meliá Group).	Santiago Muñoz Machado
VIII Edition	2023	Isak Andic (Mango).	Santiago Muñoz Machado
IX Edition	2024	María Teresa Rodríguez (Galletas Gullón).	Santiago Muñoz Machado

== Programmes ==
Over the years, they have developed several activities to promote the role of entrepreneurship in society. In addition to the "Encuentros Economía y Sociedad", where groups of entrepreneurs from the different Autonomous Communities meet regularly in forums to discuss the economic and institutional situation, international business forums are also held, such as the "V Spain-US Business Forum", organised jointly with the Spain-US Chamber of Commerce of New York in Madrid in May 2015.

Among the different programmes:

- Some aim to bridge the gap between business and Parliament: Business-Parliamentary Programme (PEP), Executives-Parliament (acs) and Executive Management Programme for Parliamentarians (PEGP);
- Other programmes are those for education and the transfer of knowledge: Educational Cooperation Programme and the Spanish Seniors for Technical Cooperation Programme (SECOT);
- There are also programmes for the judiciary, diplomatic careers, and economic and defence administration: Programa Empresas Magistrados-Jueces (PEMJ), Programa Empresas-Carrera Diplomática (PECD), Programa Empresas-Funcionarios del Ministerio de Economía y Competitividad and Programa Empresas-Defensa (PED).

== Boards of Directors ==
Periods	Presidents
2024-	Juan María Nin Génova
2021-2024	Manuel Pérez-Sala Gozalo
2018-2021	John de Zulueta Greenebaum
2015-2018	Javier Vega de Seoane Azpilicueta
2012-2015	Mónica de Oriol Icaza
2004-2012	Claudio Boada Pallarés
2000-2004	Manuel Azpilicueta Ferrer
1992-1999	Carlos Espinosa de los Monteros
1984-1991	José Joaquín Ysasi-Ysasmendi Adaro
1977-1983	Santiago Foncillas Casaus

== Bibliography ==
- Rodríguez Braun, Carlos (2002). 25 years of the Cŕrculo de Empresarios 1977 - 2002. Madrid: Círculo de Empresarios. Accessed 3 October 2022..
