= Carlos Espinosa de los Monteros y Bernaldo de Quirós =

Spanish peer and businessman (1944–2026)

The Most Illustrious The Marquess of Valtierra
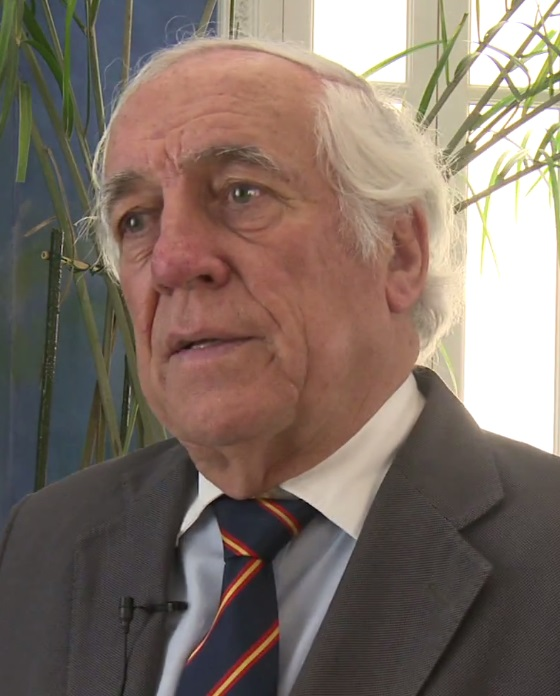
- Espinosa de los Monteros in 2014

Personal details
- Born: 18 March 1944 Madrid, Spain
- Died: 29 August 2026 (aged 82)
- Spouse: María Eugenia de Simón y Vallarino (m. 1970)
- Children: 5, including Iván
- Education: Complutense University; ICADE; Northwestern University (MBA)
- Occupation: Businessman, civil servant

Carlos Espinosa de los Monteros y Bernaldo de Quirós, 4th Marquess of Valtierra (18 March 1944 – 29 August 2026), was a Spanish peer, executive and civil servant. He was the father of Vox politician Iván Espinosa de los Monteros.

== Early life ==
Espinosa was born in Madrid on 18 March 1944. He was the son of Francisco Javier Espinosa de los Monteros y Herreros de Tejada and Galinda de la Guardia Bernaldo de Quirós y Alcalá Galiano. Through his father, he was a grandson of Carlos Espinosa de los Monteros y Bermejillo, a prominent military officer and diplomat, and a great nephew of Eugenio Espinosa de los Monteros y Bermejillo, Francoist Ambassador to Nazi Germany. Through his mother he was a grandson of Jesús Bernaldo de Quirós, MP and Grandee of Spain, and Consuelo Alcalá-Galiano y Osma, Lady to the Queen, and a great-grandson of Emilio Alcalá Galiano, Minister of State during the reign of Alfonso XII.

He obtained a degree in law at the Complutense University of Madrid in 1965, and in Business Administration at the ICADE in 1966. He also earned an MBA at Northwestern University.

== Career ==
Espinosa joined the Corps of Commercial Technicians of the State in 1969. He was vice-president of the Instituto Nacional de Industria (INI), the holding company of state-owned businesses in Spain, and then became Chairman of Iberia and Aviaco in 1983, leaving both posts in March 1985. He inherited the noble title of Marquess of Valtierra from his father in 1985. From 1988 to 2009 he was chairman and CEO of Mercedes Benz Spain. In March 1992 he was elected president of the Círculo de Empresarios ("Circle of Businessmen") as substitute of José Joaquín de Ysasi-Ysasmendi, remaining in this capacity until 2000.

In 2012, Espinosa—by the time as vice-president of Inditex—was appointed by the Government of Mariano Rajoy to the post of High Commissioner for the 'Marca España' ("Brand Spain"), tasked with representing private firms abroad, financed by the Ministry of Foreign Affairs. He was sworn in on 12 July 2012. Following the accession of Pedro Sánchez to the post of Prime Minister in June 2018, he was removed from office in October 2018 with the High Commissariat replaced by the Secretariat of State for Global Spain.

== Personal life and death ==
On 30 March 1970, Espinosa married María Eugenia de Simón y Vallarino, with whom he had five children, including Beltrán, CFO of fashion brand Stradivarius, and Iván (b. 1971), Vice-Secretary for Foreign Relations of the far-right political party Vox.

Espinosa died on 29 August 2026, at the age of 82.

== Decorations ==
- Grand Cross of the Order of Civil Merit (2009)
- Sash of the Order of the Aztec Eagle (2015)
- Grand Cross of the Order of Isabella the Catholic (2018)
