= Jacinto Morano =

Spanish labour lawyer and politician

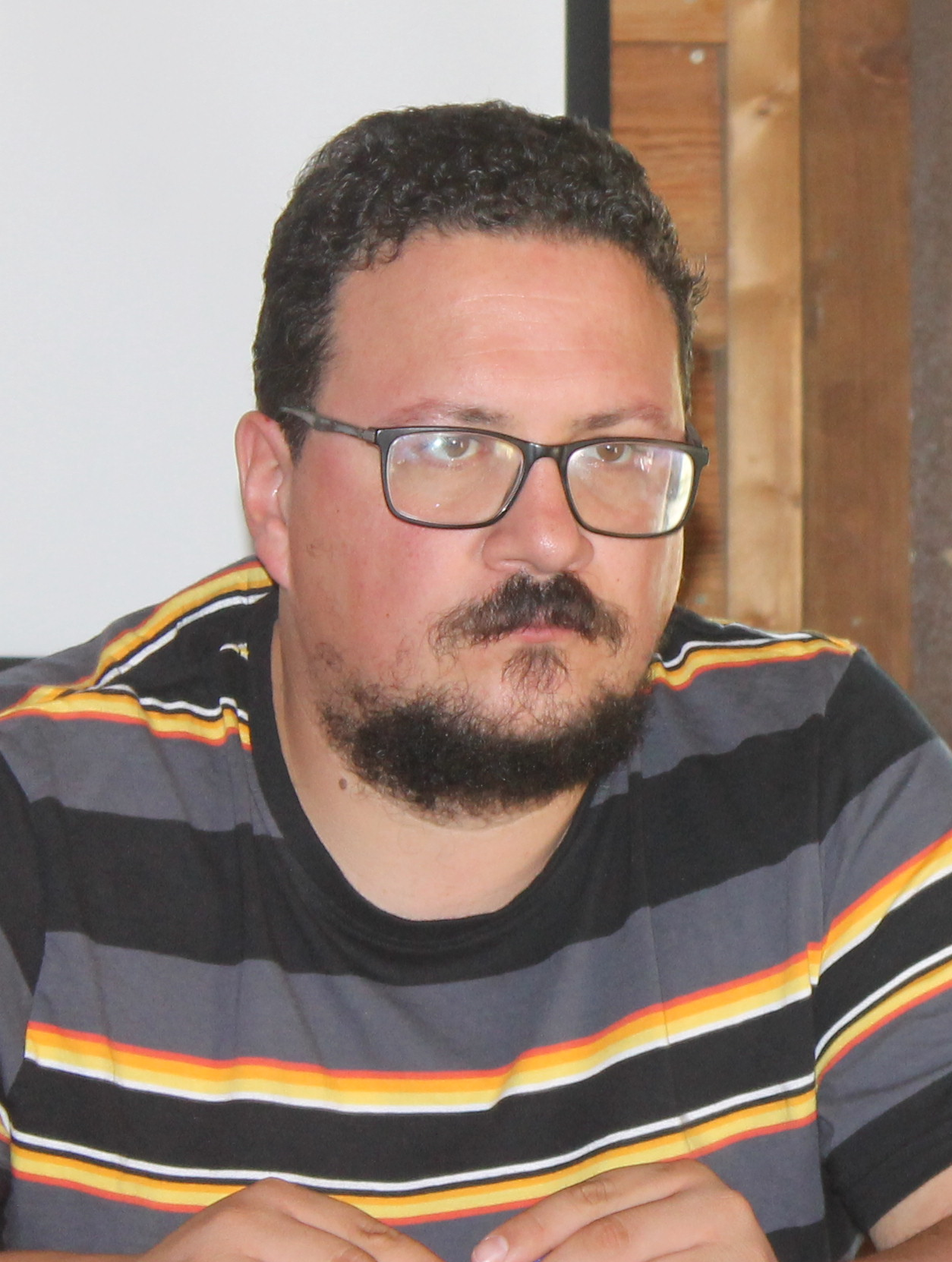

Member of the Assembly of Madrid
- Incumbent
- Assumed office 9 June 2015

Senator
- In office 19 February 2019 – 4 March 2019

Personal details
- Born: 5 February 1984; Madrid
- Citizenship: Spanish
- Occupation: Labour lawyer, politician

Jacinto Morano González (born 1984) is a Spanish labour lawyer and politician. He has served as a member of the 10th Assembly of Madrid in the Podemos Parliamentary Group, as well as Senator.

== Biography ==
Born on 5 February 1984 in Madrid, he graduated in Law and Economy at the Charles III University of Madrid (UC3M), As lawyer, he participated in the processes regarding the collective dismissal procedure in Canal Nou, representing the General Confederation of Labor (CGT), and the collective dismissal procedure in Telemadrid.

He ran seventh on the Podemos list in the 2015 Madrilenian regional election, and became a member of the 10th term of the regional legislature. During the legislative period, he was affiliated with the "anticapitalista" faction of the Podemos parliamentary group, although, similarly to Isabel Serra or Beatriz Gimeno, he estranged himself off from the faction at some point of the term. Following his appointment as Senator on 7 February 2019 by the Assembly of Madrid, he joined the Upper House on 19 February. On 11 March 2019, his inclusion in the Isabel Serra-led list to the regional primary election in Podemos (prior to the 2019 Madrilenian regional election) was announced.
