= Carolina Alonso =

Spanish politician (born 1980)

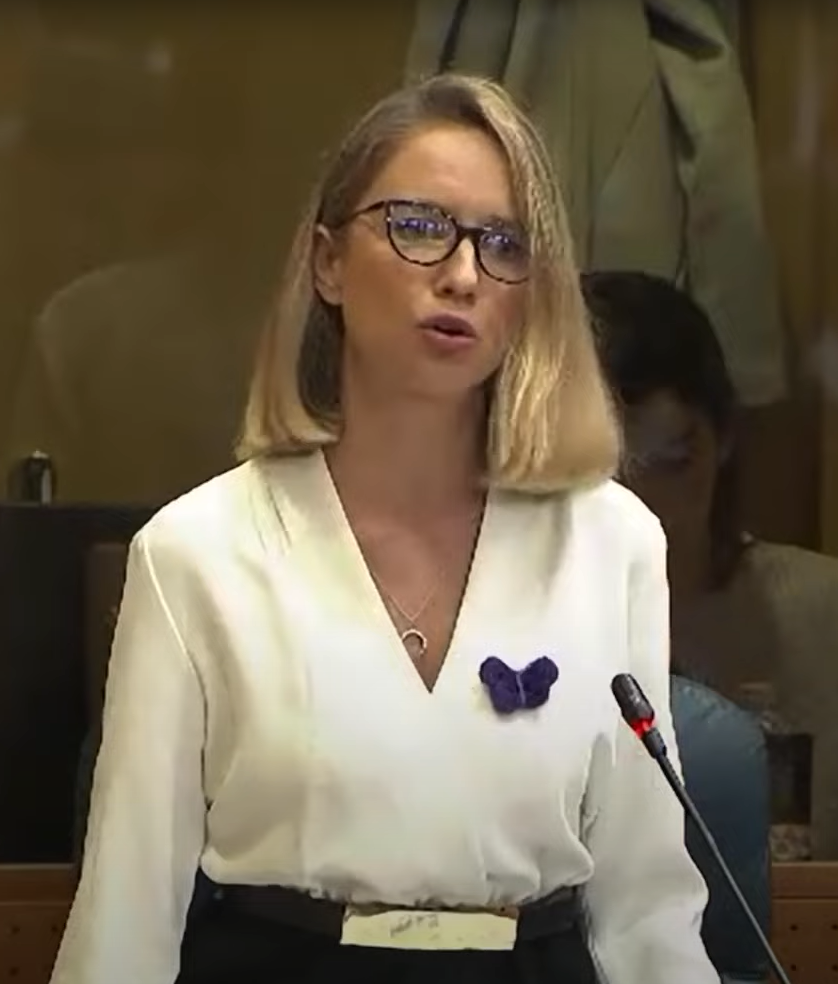

Member of the Assembly of Madrid
- In office 26 June 2019 – 13 June 2023

Leader of Podemos in the Assembly of Madrid
- In office 4 May 2021 – 13 June 2023
- Preceded by: Isabel Serra
- Succeeded by: Party lost all seats

Personal details
- Born: 17 October 1980 Gijón, Spain
- Party: Podemos (until 2023)
- Education: University of Oviedo (Pedagogy); University of the Basque Country (Political Sciences)

Carolina Alonso Alonso (born 17 October 1980) is a Spanish politician. She was elected to the Assembly of Madrid in the 2019 elections and led Podemos there from 2021 to 2023. She quit the party in December 2023.

== Biography ==
Born in Gijón in Asturias, Alonso graduated in Pedagogy from the University of Oviedo, and in Political Sciences from the University of the Basque Country.

In November 2016, she was elected to the Citizens' Council of Podemos in the Community of Madrid, as part of the sector backing Ramón Espinar Merino. During tensions in the party between leader Pablo Iglesias and Íñigo Errejón, she backed the former.

Alonso was placed seventh on Unidas Podemos's list for the 2019 Madrilenian regional election, led by Isabel Serra, and seven members were elected. She was again placed seventh in 2021, and ten members were elected.

After the 2021 Assembly of Madrid elections, Iglesias retired from politics after having led Podemos's list, and Serra resigned. Alonso then led the party in the legislature.

Alonso switched to municipal politics for the 2023 Madrid City Council election, running in second on the Podemos-United Left-Green Alliance list led by former athlete Roberto Sotomayor. Podemos lost all of its seats both in the city and region of Madrid. On 11 December 2023, both Alonso and Sotomayor quit Podemos after the party split from the left-wing coalition Sumar.
