= Clara Ramas =

Spanish politician (born 1986)

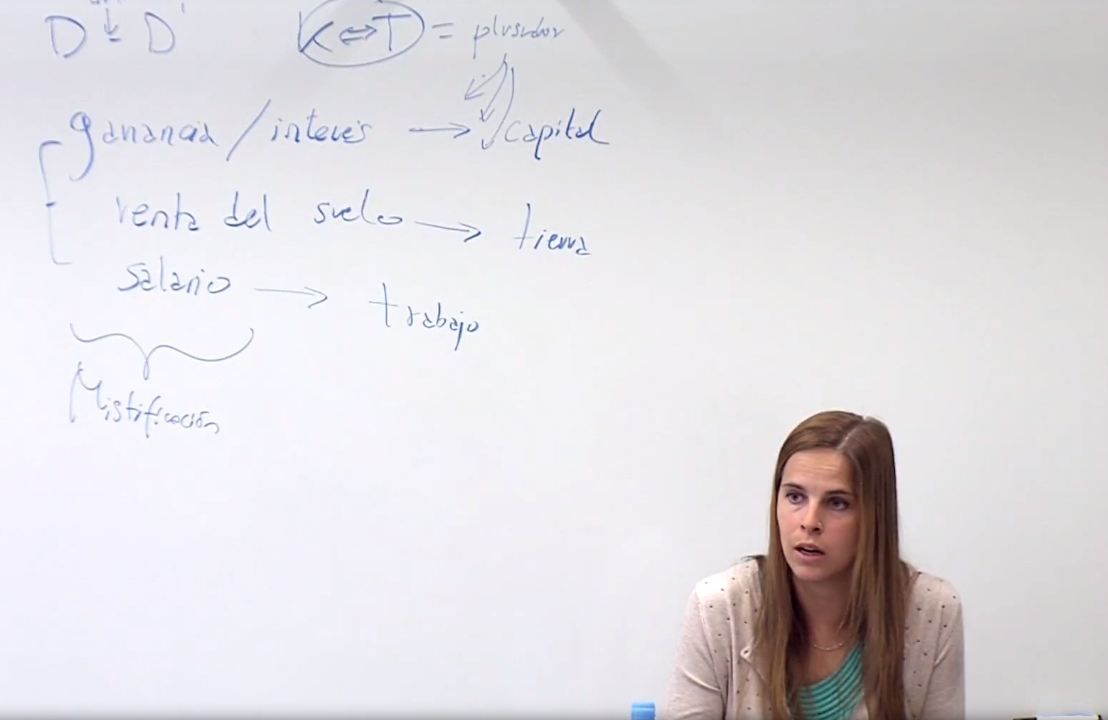

Member of the Assembly of Madrid
- Incumbent
- Assumed office 11 June 2019

Personal details
- Born: 8 May 1986 (age 39) Madrid, Spain
- Party: Más Madrid
- Occupation: Postdoctoral researcher, politician, philosopher

Clara Ramas San Miguel (born 1986) is a Spanish philosopher and politician. She is a member of the 11th term of the Assembly of Madrid, integrated within the Más Madrid parliamentary group.

== Biography ==
Born on 8 May 1986 in Madrid. She earned a European Doctorate at the Complutense University of Madrid (UCM), where she has been employed researching the work of Karl Marx. She has also been a postdoc researcher at the Valencia Catholic University. She has described herself as "heterodox marxist, orthodox anti-liberal". An opinion writer for the online publication CTXT, and noted intellectual reference for the errejonismo, in March 2019 Ramas was included in the Íñigo Errejón platform vis-à-vis the build-up of the Más Madrid list for the May 2019 Madrilenian regional election. Ultimately included in the 18th place of the Más Madrid list, she was elected member of the 11th term of the Assembly of Madrid.

== Works ==
- — (2018). Fetiche y mistificación capitalistas: La crítica de la economía política de Marx. Madrid: Siglo XXI.
