= José María Marco =

Spanish writer

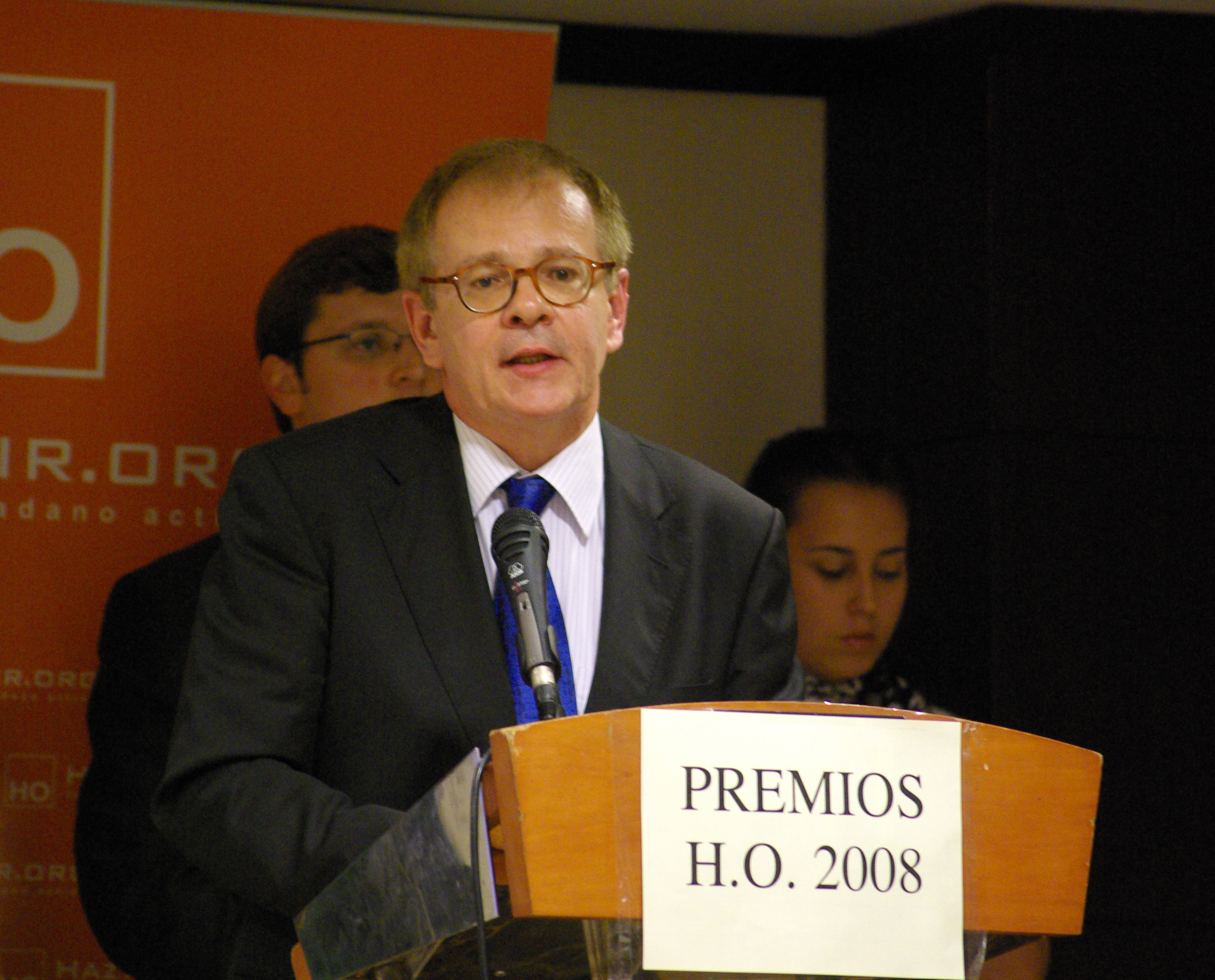
- Born: Madrid
- Occupation: Writer, essayist, columnist, opinion writer, journalist, university teacher, editing staff, translator
- Position held: associate professor

José María Marco Tobarra (born 1955) is a Spanish essayist and liberal-conservative opinion journalist.

== Biography ==
He was born in 1955 in Madrid. In 1972 after studying Philosophy at the University of Paris VIII, he obtained a licentiate degree in Hispanic Philology at the Complutense University of Madrid and a PhD in Literature in the later university. He is openly gay. Described as a "reneged far-left militant turned into one of the minds behind the (promotion of) 'American way' conservatism" in Spain, he advocates for "giving moral and civic content to the liberal doctrinary corpus".

A contributor to media outlets such as La Razón, La Ilustración Liberal and Libertad Digital (of which he is a founding member), Marco has also collaborated in conservative think tanks such as FAES, FIL and the "Floridablanca Network". He has also worked as associate lecturer of International Relations at the Comillas Pontifical University.

He contested the April 2019 Senate election in Madrid as candidate of the far-right Vox, commanding 610,601 votes, short of the 957,626 votes obtained by the last elected senator. He also ran second in the party list for the 26 May 2019 Madrilenian regional election, and, thus, he was elected member of the regional legislature, as Vox obtained 12 out of the 132 seats up for election. However, Marco refused to assume the parliamentary seat before the inaugural session of the new legislative term citing "health motives".

== Works ==
Author

- — (1988). Inteligencia republicana: Manuel Azaña 1897–1930. Madrid: Biblioteca Nueva.
- — (1990). Azaña. Madrid: Mondadori.
- — (1997). La libertad traicionada. Siete ensayos españoles. Costa, Ganivet, Prat de la Riba, Unamuno, Maeztu, Azaña, Ortega y Gasset. Barcelona: Planeta.
- — (2007). La nueva revolución americana. Madrid: Editorial Ciudadela.
- — (2011). Una historia patriótica de España. Planeta.
- — (2013). Maura. La política pura. Madrid: Gota a Gota.
- — (2015). Sueño y destrucción de España. Los nacionalistas españoles (1898–2015). Planeta.
- — (2019). Diez Razones para amar a España. Madrid: Arzalia.
- — (2019). El verdadero amante. Lope de Vega y el amor. Madrid: Ediciones Insólitas.

Coordinator

- Marco, José María (Coord.) (1998). Genealogía del liberalismo español, 1759–1931. Madrid: FAES.
