= Rocío Monasterio =

Spanish–Cuban politician (born 1974)

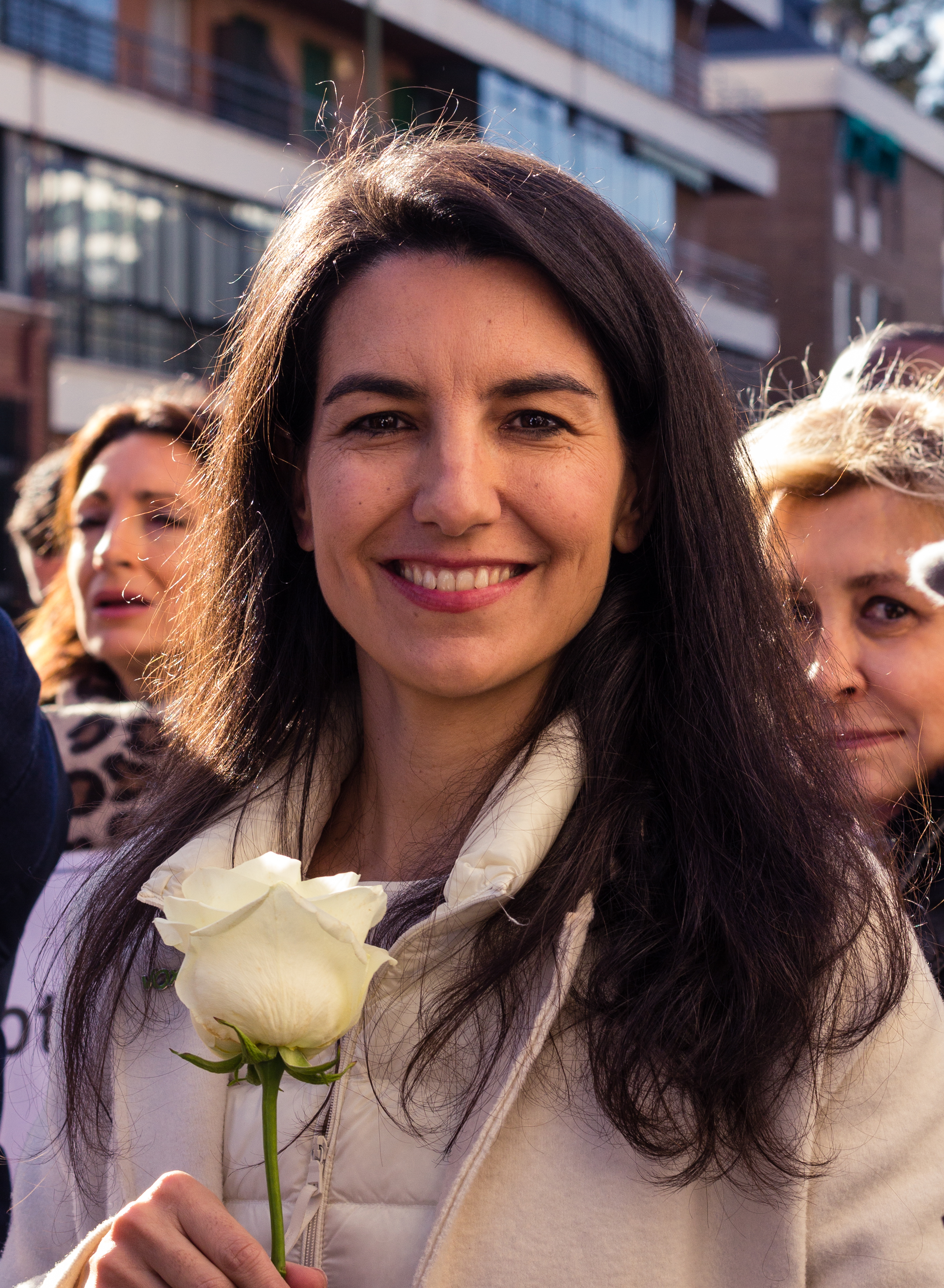
- Monasterio in 2019

Member of the Assembly of Madrid
- In office 11 June 2019 – 10 October 2024

Personal details
- Born: Rocío Monasterio San Martín; 4 February 1974 (age 52) Madrid, Spain
- Party: Vox (2014–2024)
- Spouse: Iván Espinosa de los Monteros (m. 2001)
- Children: 4
- Education: Higher Technical School of Architecture of Madrid
- Occupation: Architect • Politician

Rocío Monasterio San Martín (born 4 February 1974) is a Spanish architect, businesswoman and politician. She was the leader of the Madrid branch of the right-wing Spanish political party Vox, and served as a member of the 11th term of the Assembly of Madrid until 10 October 2024, when she resigned from all political positions after being removed from regional leadership by the party's national executive.

== Biography ==
Born on 4 February 1974 her birthplace is equally reported to be either Cuba or Madrid. Monasterio has claimed that her birthplace is Madrid. Her Cuban ancestors were large landowners in Cienfuegos. They also owned the Manuelita sugar mill and the Compañía Azucarera Atlántica del Golfo, which was listed on the New York Stock Exchange. The family had links with the Fulgencio Batista regime. Some of the Monasterio family's properties were nationalised in the 1960s following the Cuban revolution, leading some of the family to immigrate to Spain. (Note: According to the sources placing her birthplace in Cuba, she lived in Cuba as a child, but was relocated to Spain with her parents.) Her father opened the first KFC in Spain.

Monasterio began studies in architecture at the Higher Technical School of Architecture of Madrid (ETSAM) in 1992. Monasterio and her architecture firm focused on acquiring properties and turning them into high-end lofts. She earned her degree in architecture in 2009 (the same year she joined the Colegio Oficial de Arquitectos de Madrid). This circumstance has led to the questioning of several plans and building certifications she reportedly signed in the capacity of "facultative director" at least as early as 2003. The projects include partial demolitions for which she implicitly claimed to have the professional qualification which is condicio sine qua non to sign them off. (Note: Clients of the architectural firm headed by Monasterio who happen to have bought or dwelled into these irregular lofts include fellow member of the Assembly of Madrid Ignacio Aguado and actor Arturo Valls.)

== Career ==
=== Architecture ===
Monasterio studied architecture at the Technical University of Madrid, and specialized in Urban Environments. In 1997 she received a prize from Otis International for her design of 3000 homes in Hong Kong. In 2000, Monasterio founded her architecture firm called Rocío Monasterio and Associates. She is also a regular media contributor, appearing weekly on the political talk show "El gato al agua" on Intereconomía TV, as well as on various programmes on CNN en Español, commenting on current events in Cuba.

=== Politics ===
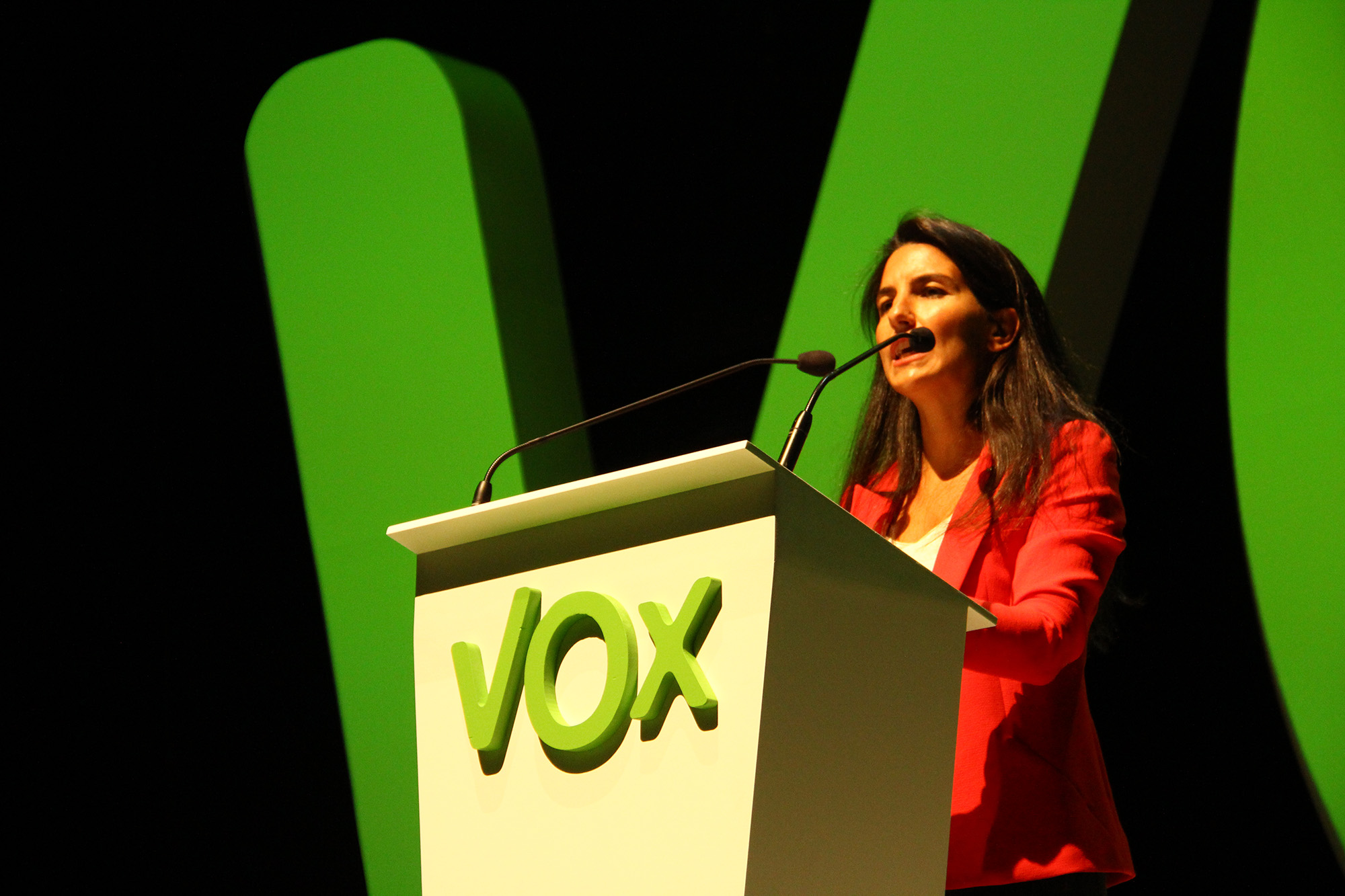
Monasterio at a Vox presentation in Vistalegre.

Rocío Monasterio joined Vox in 2014. Currently she is the president of Vox Madrid. She is also the vice-secretary of Social Matters for the party.

In December 2018, Monasterio stated that her life has been threatened and that she's been physically assaulted, spat on, and insulted as well as hit by rocks by "feminists". Monasterio is a speaker for HazteOir (English: Make Yourself Heard), having supported the latter group's polemical bus sporting a message that denied the existence of transexuality in children.

She ran as the Vox candidate in the 2021 Madrilenian regional election. Following a death threat of unknown origin in the form of a menacing mail with four rifle bullets issued to Podemos candidate Pablo Iglesias, a clash ensued between Iglesias and Monasterio in a Cadena SER debate over the latter's refusal to explicitly condemn the incident. This prompted Iglesias to walk out of the debate, which was followed by PSOE and Más Madrid candidates doing likewise shortly thereafter.

== Political positions ==
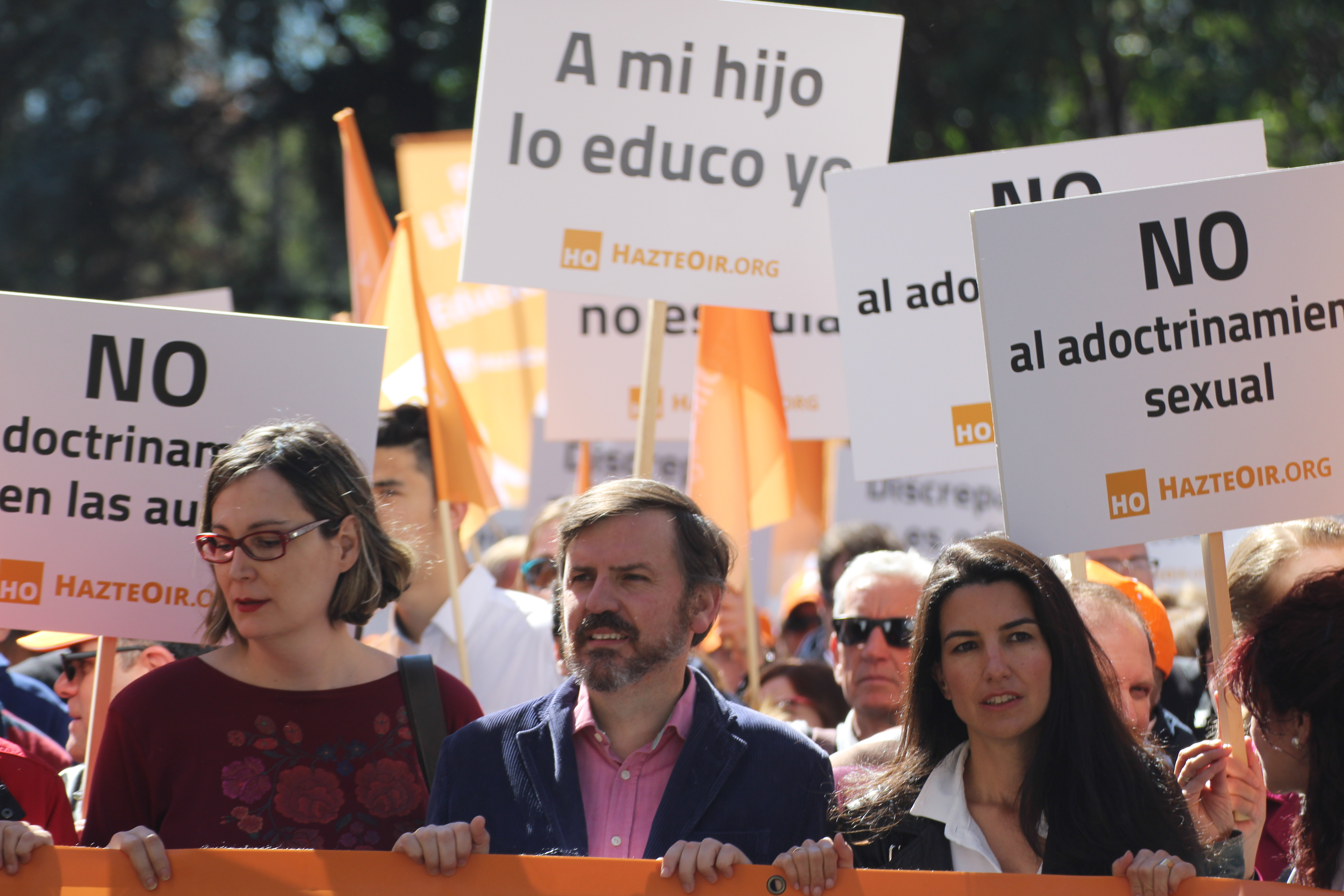
Monasterio (on right) at a HazteOir demonstration

Monasterio is against abortion. In a march on 15 April 2018, she affirmed that her party, Vox, stands for the rights of the unborn. Monasterio, who considers herself a feminist in the vein of 19th century thinker Concepción Arenal, is opposed to what she considers radical feminism stating that it tends to demonize the traditional family. Monasterio wants to replace Violence Against Women laws with Violence Against Family, to protect not only women who are victims of violence but any family member who may be a victim of family violence.

Monasterio is against the practice of surrogacy and talking to children about choices in sexual orientation such as zoophilia, which regional authorities have stated do not exist as she describes. She stated she'd move the Madrid Gay Pride Parade, the largest in Europe, from the city centre to the Casa de Campo park, and that marriage is between a man and a woman; that other unions are civil unions, not marriages. She was one of the promoters of a requirement before the Spanish Ombudsman filed in November 2016 criticising the regional government of Madrid for banning conversion therapies to "cure gays", asking for a repeal initiative to be formulated before the Constitutional Court.

Monasterio is a climate change denier, would like to deport all illegal immigrants and believes criminals who commit intra-family violence should receive life in prison.

Internationally, Monasterio is a member of the Madrid Forum, an international group organized by Vox that is composed of right-wing and far-right individuals. Monasterio condemns the Cuban government of the brothers Raúl and Fidel Castro, and successor, Miguel Díaz-Canel. She denounced African immigration and advocated the immediate expulsion of undocumented migrants. On the other hand, she justified immigration from Venezuela and Cuba, arguing that migrants from these countries were fleeing "dictatorships". She has participated in anti-communist rallies denouncing the regime in Cuba.

== Personal life ==
On 15 May 2001, Monasterio married real estate developer Iván Espinosa de los Monteros. They have four children. An architect by training, she herself designed the house in which the couple moved in 2012. Built by a company owned by her husband, the value of the house is estimated at 3 million euros.
