= Servicio de Publicaciones (Universidad Complutense de Madrid) =

- Country of origin: Spain
- Headquarters location: Madrid
- Publication types: Scholarly books and journals
- Official website: www.ucm.es/publicaciones

The Servicio de Publicaciones is the publishing business of the Universidad Complutense de Madrid. It publishes a number of academic journals, mostly in Spanish. There are also 9 series of monographs associated with these journals. The company also publishes in electronic format the honors doctoral theses of the university. Their books are distributed by UDL Books and UneBook.

Alicia Castillo Mena is the current Director of Publications, and Isabel María García Fernández is the current Chairwoman of the Editorial Board.
