= Emilio Alcalá-Galiano, 4th Count of Casa Valencia =

Spanish noble and politician

Don Emilio Alcalá-Galiano IV count of Casa-Valencia, grandee of Spain
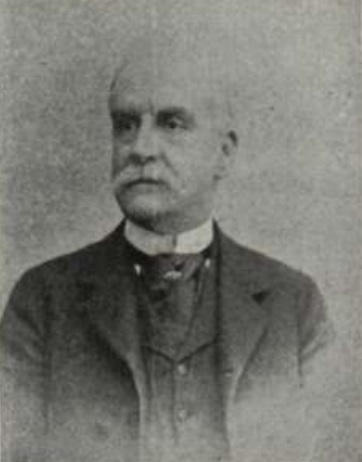
- Born: 7 March 1831; Madrid
- Died: 12 November 1914 (aged 83); San Sebastián
- Occupations: Diplomat and politician
- Political party: Moderate Party (Spain)
- Other political affiliations: Conservative Party (Spain)
- Spouse: Ana de Osma y Zavala
- Children: Álvaro Alcalá-Galiano y Osma; Juan Alcalá-Galiano y Osma; Emilio Alcalá-Galiano y Osma; Consuelo Alcalá-Galiano y Osma; María Teresa Alcalá-Galiano y Osma
- Father: Antonio Alcalá Galiano

Don Emilio Alcalá-Galiano y Valencia, 4th Count of Casa Valencia and 2nd Viscount of the Pontón (7 March 1831, in Madrid, Spain – 12 November 1914, in San Sebastián, Spain) was a Spanish noble and politician who served as Minister of State in the reign of King Alfonso XII.

== Biography ==
In 1876, he was elected senator for Granada and in 1877, as a member of the Liberal Conservative Party, senator for life.

In 1879, he entered the Royal Spanish Academy and was appointed Minister Plenipotentiary in Lisbon. In 1895, he became Spanish Ambassador to the United Kingdom, a position he held until 1897 when he resigned when the Liberal Party came to power.

After approval by the House of Commons in London, on 9 March 1908, she called for women's suffrage, arguing that "Women in Spain can be queens but not voters." Eight days later the first debate on women's suffrage was held in the Congress of Deputies.

The palace he built on Paseo de la Castellana in Madrid is currently the headquarters of the Ministry of the Interior. He also owned the palace of Ayete in San Sebastian.

Political offices
Preceded by Alejandro de Castro	Minister of State; 12 September 1875–29 November 1875	Succeeded by Fernando Calderón de la Barca
