= Alicia V. Rubio =

Spanish politician

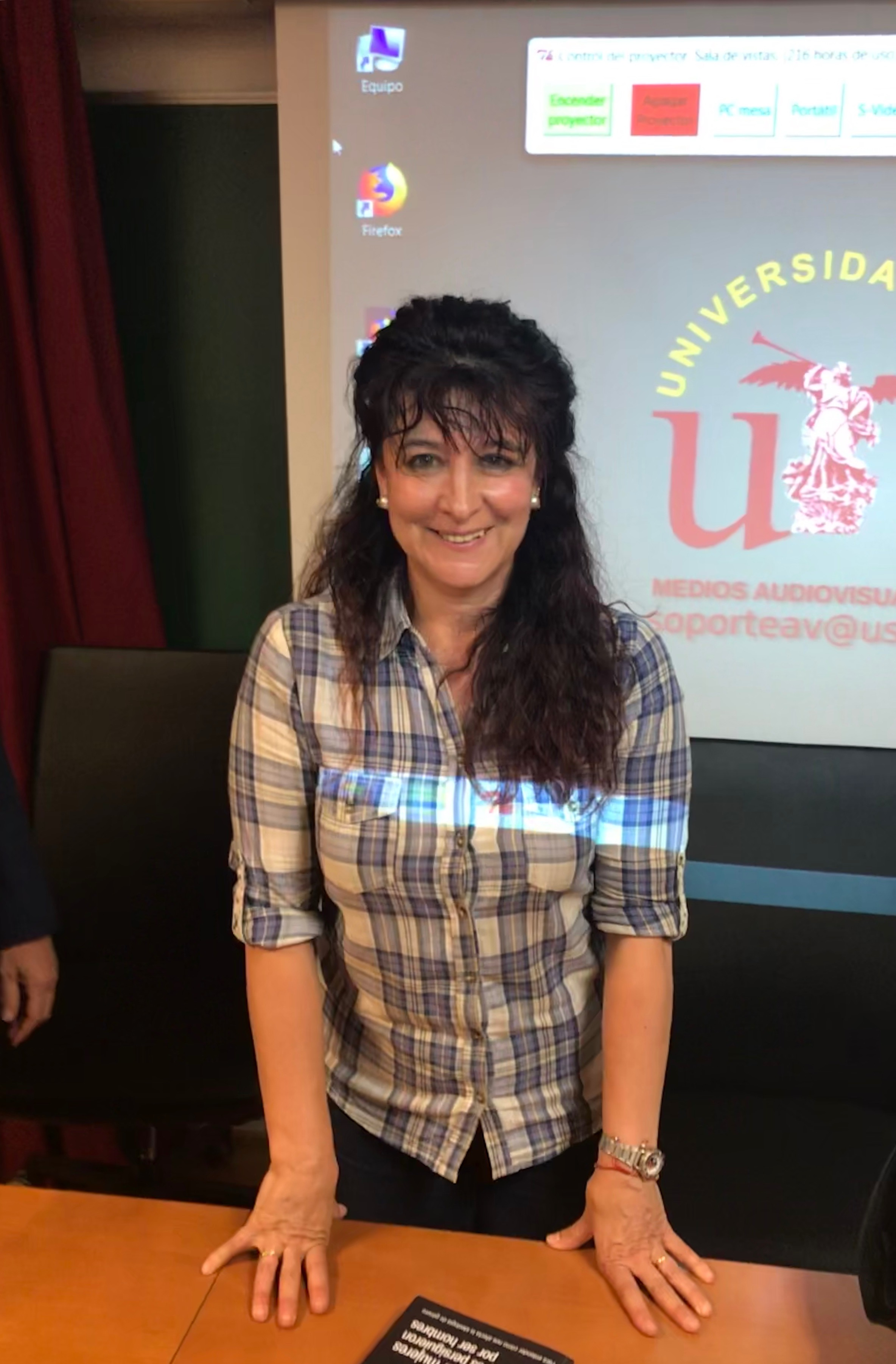

Member of the Assembly of Madrid
- Incumbent
- Assumed office 11 June 2019

Personal details
- Born: Alicia Verónica Rubio Calle; January 13, 1962 (age 64)
- Party: Vox
- Education: University of Salamanca
- Occupation: Politician

Alicia Verónica Rubio Calle (born 13 January 1962) is a Spanish politician for Vox who has served as a member of the Assembly of Madrid since 2019.

== Biography ==
Rubio was born on January 13, 1962, in Logroño. She graduated with a degree in she graduated in philology from the University of Salamanca in 1986.

She is a member of the national executive of Vox and has been the party spokeswoman on the issue of social mobility. In 2019, she was elected to the Assembly of Madrid.
