= Juan María Nin =

Spanish lawyer and economist (born 1953)

- Born: Juan María Nin Génova; 1953 (age 72–73); Barcelona, Spain
- Education: University of Deusto; London School of Economics and Political Science
- Occupations: Lawyer; economist
- Known for: General Manager of Banco Santander (1999–2002); Chief Executive Officer of Banco Sabadell (2002–2007); Vice-Chairman of CaixaBank (2011–2014)
- Spouse: Alicia Garaizabal
- Children: 4
- Honours: Grand Cross of the Order of Civil Merit (2013); Grand Cross of Police Merit
- Website: https://www.juanmarianingenova.com/

Juan María Nin Génova (born 1953) is a Spanish lawyer and economist who has served as president of the Círculo de Empresarios since 2024. After an early commission as a lieutenant in the Spanish Marine Infantry, he went on to hold senior positions in Spain’s public administration and in the finance and energy sectors. He has also held various directorial roles at the University of Deusto, ⁣⁣ESADE, and the Deusto Business School.

== Early life and education ==
Nin was born in 1953 in Barcelona.

He earned a degree in Law and Economics from the University of Deusto and later completed a master's degree in Law and Politics at the London School of Economics.

== Career ==
Juan María Nin's professional career has focused on the banking sector. He was formerly involved in bank and savings bank mergers in Spain and held management positions in Spanish listed companies. His executive roles include:

- Executive vice-president and CEO of La Caixa,
- CEO of Banco Sabadell
- Managing director of Banco Santander
- Board member of Société Générale de Banque, serving on its Risk, Remuneration, and US Risk Committees.

He has also been involved in the energy sector and served on the boards of Cepsa, Repsol, and Naturgy among other companies.

In 2024, Nin became chairman of ITP Aero, Itínere Infraestructuras, Mora Banc, Tressis, and the European Advisory Board of Metyis. He also serves as an operating partner of Corsair Capital.

From 1978 to 1980, he served on the ministerial team negotiating Spain’s accession to the European Communities. Since then, he has expressed his support of the European project. A former president of the Spain-US Council Foundation, he is considered an expert on bilateral relations between the two countries. He has been a regular participant in international forums, including meetings of the Bilderberg Group, seminars at the International Monetary Fund (IMF), and conferences organized by the analysis firm Greenmantle. In addition to his involvement in these forums, he has authored several books and analytical articles on economics and social science. One of his notable publications, Por un crecimiento racional, analyzes the 2008 financial crisis and has received positive reviews for its assessment of the economic challenges of that period.

In 2013, he received the Grand Cross of the Order of Civil Merit, and later he was awarded the Grand Cross of Police Merit.

== Personal life ==
He is married to Alicia Garaizabal, and they have four children together.

== Published books ==
In 2017, Nin's book "Por un crecimiento racional" (Ed. Deusto) was published by Deusto. The book reflected on the economy and finance and proposed a series of political and economic reforms for the future.

== External golf links ==
- "Toca Transaccional" by Juan María Nin, Expansión (December 4, 2024)
- "Bola de partido o campeonato" by Juan María Nin, The Objective (October 8, 2024)
- "Punto Ciego" by José Antonio Zarzalejos, podcast | Juan María Nin: "Hemos perdido 3 batallas: Defensa, tecnología y energía nuclear"
