= Josep Ferrer Sala =

Spanish win executive (1925–2024)

Josep Ferrer Sala (19 October 1925 – 6 November 2024) was a Spanish wine executive who was the president of Freixenet from 1978 to 1999.

== Biography ==
Born in Sant Sadurní d'Anoia, Catalonia, he was the son of Freixenet's founders, Pedro Ferrer Bosch and Dolors Sala Vivé. During the Spanish Civil War, he lost his father and brother. After the conflict, his mother and sisters managed the business until he joined in 1947.

Ferrer became general manager in 1959 and later president in 1978. During his tenure, Freixenet expanded its production capacity, updated its facilities, introduced the Cordón Negro label, and established wineries in France, the United States, Mexico, Argentina, and Australia. After stepping down from daily operations in 1999, Ferrer remained involved as honorary co-chairman, serving as an advisor and maintaining a role on the company's Board of Wisdom.

In 2018, Freixenet became part of Henkell & Co., leading to the formation of Henkell Freixenet.

Ferrer also supported various cultural and sporting institutions, including theatres, museums, an orchestra, a music school, and a hockey club.
