= Carlos Seco Serrano =

Spanish historian (1923–2020)

- Born: 14 November 1923; Toledo, Spain
- Died: 12 April 2020 (aged 96); Madrid, Spain
- Occupation: Historian

Carlos Seco Serrano (14 November 1923 – 12 April 2020) was a Spanish historian who specialised in the contemporary era.

== Biography ==
He was born in Toledo, and died, aged 96, in Madrid, a victim of the COVID-19 pandemic.

He studied Philosophy and Letters at the Central University, obtaining a bachelor's degree, with an extraordinary prize, in 1945. In 1950 he obtained a doctorate in History with the presentation of the thesis entitled Diplomatic relations between Spain and Venice in the time of Philip III, achieving the highest qualification and—again—the extraordinary prize. He had Ciriaco Pérez Bustamante and, above all, Jesús Pabón as teachers.

He has been professor of General History of Spain and of Contemporary History of Spain at the Faculty of Philosophy and Letters of the University of Barcelona between 1957 and 1975 and professor of Contemporary History of Spain at the Faculty of Information Sciences of the Complutense University of Madrid between 1975 and 1989. After his retirement, he was named professor emeritus at the same university.

Seco Serrano was elected to medalla nº 12 of the Real Academia de la Historia on 21 January 1977 and took up his seat on 5 February 1978.
