= Iván Espinosa de los Monteros =

Spanish politician (born 1971)

Iván Espinosa de los Monteros MP
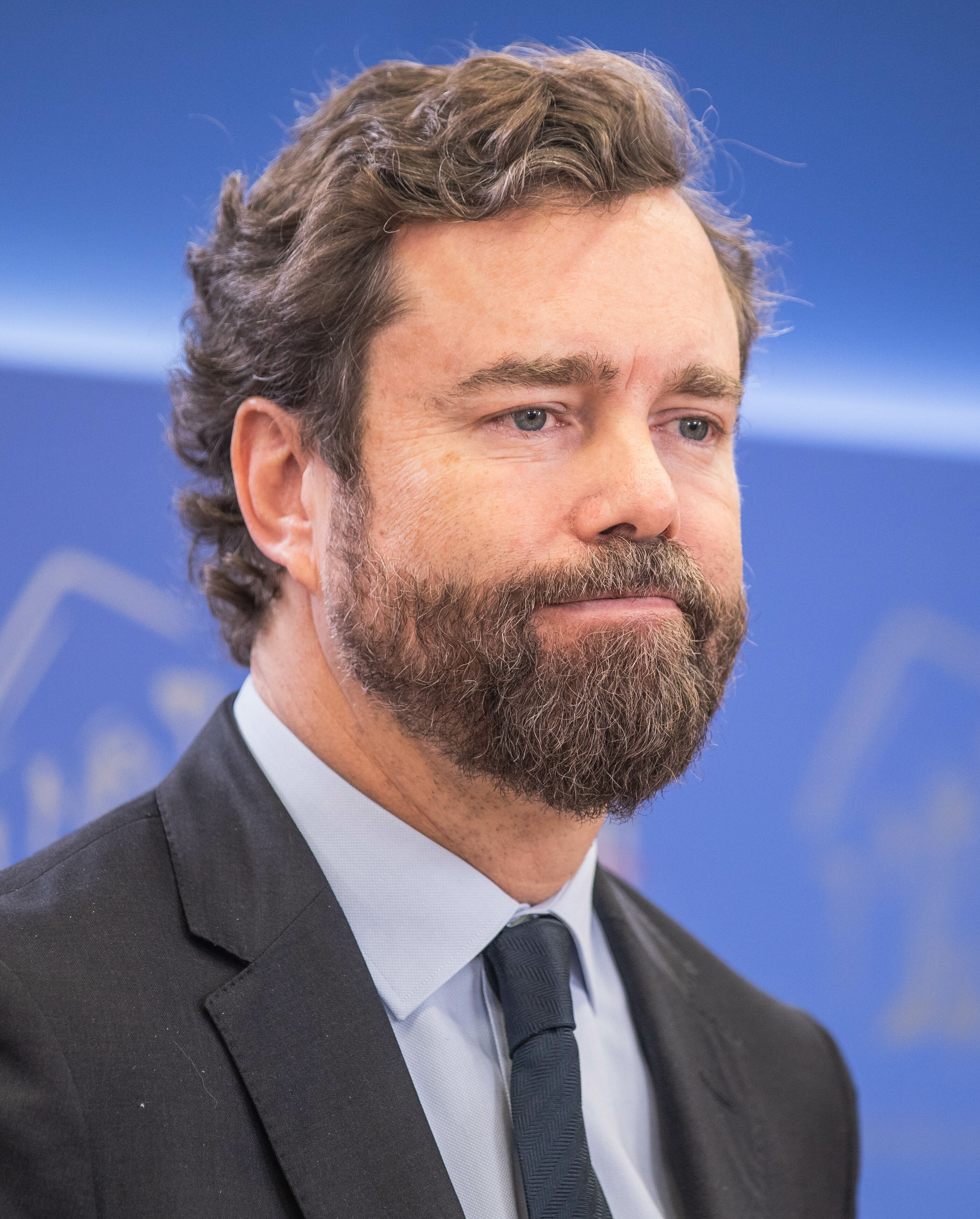
- Iván Espinosa de los Monteros in 2023

Spokesperson of Vox in the Congress of Deputies
- In office 11 June 2019 – 30 May 2023
- Preceded by: Office established
- Succeeded by: Pepa Millán

Member of the Congress of Deputies
- In office 21 May 2019 – 17 August 2023
- Constituency: Madrid

Personal details
- Born: Iván Espinosa de los Monteros y de Simón; 3 January 1971 (age 55) Madrid, Spain
- Party: Vox (2013–2026)
- Spouse: Rocío Monasterio (m. 2001)
- Children: 4
- Education: ICADE; Kellogg School of Management
- Occupation: Real estate developer, economist and politician

Iván Espinosa de los Monteros y de Simón (born 3 January 1971) is a Spanish real estate developer and former politician who served as Member of the Congress of Deputies for the Madrid constituency from 2019 to 2023.

As a prominent member of the Spanish national-conservative political party Vox, Espinosa served as Spokesperson of the Vox Parliamentary Group in Congress. Within Vox, he was the Deputy Secretary for International Relations.

== Biography ==
Espinosa was born in the City of Madrid in 1971. He is one of the five sons of executive Carlos Espinosa de los Monteros y Bernaldo de Quirós, 4th Marquess of Valtierra, and his wife, María Eugenia de Simón y Vallarino. Espinosa studied Economic and Business Sciences at the Catholic Institute of Business Administration and Management (ICADE) and got an MBA at the Kellogg School of Management.

In 2001, he married Rocío Monasterio, a Spanish-Cuban architect, with whom he has four children. The couple has sometimes worked together in the construction sector, buying unused spaces to convert them into luxury homes designed by Monasterio. He has held senior positions in several international financial groups such as Arthur Andersen, Schroders or McKinsey. He himself owns several companies in the luxury housing and restaurant sector.

He speaks Spanish, Catalan, English and French.

=== Political career ===
Linked to the political party Vox since its foundation in 2013, he held the position of General Secretary of the Provisional Organizing Committee before the celebration of the first party congress. In that congress, he was elected Secretary-General of the party until October 2016 when he assumed as Deputy Secretary for International Relations. He was part of the electoral list of Vox in the 2014 European election in Spain, led by former First Vice President of the European Parliament Vidal-Quadras. Vox did not obtain representation. He also bid for a seat of senator representing Madrid in the 2015 and 2016 general elections, failing to become a member of the Upper House after receiving, respectively, 27,222 and 20,373 votes, well short of the 725,719 and 720,901 votes obtained by the last elected senator in each election.

A noted orator, Espinosa has represented his party in various political gatherings on television. Likewise, he has manifested himself in favor of the unity of Spain and the monarchy and has said that he formerly voted for the People's Party, of which he has since been critical. Espinosa has criticized the 2004 Gender Violence Act on several occasions and he has also manifested himself in favor of the criminalisation of parties not believing in the "unity of Spain" and of those that "do not renege on Marxism."

For the 2019 general election, Espinosa was chosen to occupy the third place in the electoral list of Vox to the Congress of Deputies. On 28 April, he was elected MP for Madrid. On 21 May he was appointed Spokesperson of the Vox Parliamentary Group in the Congress.

He left the party in August 2023, shortly after 2023 Spanish general election.

=== Legal cases ===
In April 2019, the digital newspaper eldiario.es reported that a court in Madrid had sentenced a company, of which Espinosa was the only shareholder and administrator, to pay part of a debt it had contracted with a construction company that he had hired to carry out some works in a house in Madrid and on which there were discrepancies. Espinosa had paid part of the necessary repairs whose amount the court deducted from the amount claimed. The sentence was ratified by the Provincial Court of Madrid.

In November 2019, Espinosa said on Antena 3's Espejo Público programme that per capita, immigrants are three times more likely to commit rape than Spaniards. The lawyer Hilal Tarkou initiated legal action, but in December 2020 a judge closed the case because he found that no crime was committed.
