= Vanessa Lillo Gómez =

Spanish politician (born 1983)

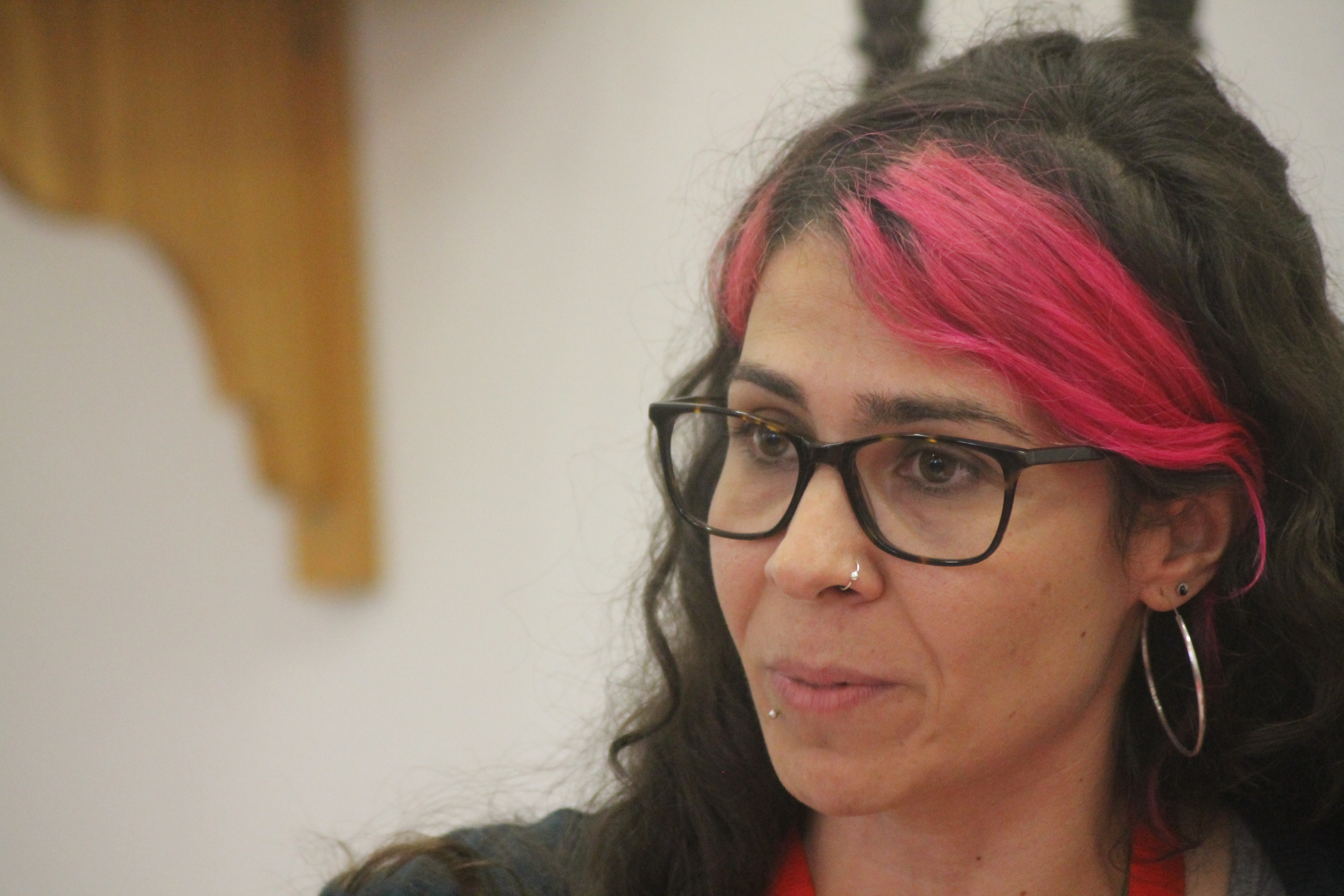

Madrid assemblywoman
- Incumbent
- Assumed office 11 June 2019

Personal details
- Born: 10 March 1983 (age 42)

Vanessa Lillo Gómez (born 10 March 1983) is a Spanish politician. Since 11 June 2019, she has been a member of the Assembly of Madrid.
