= Isabel Serra =

Spanish politician

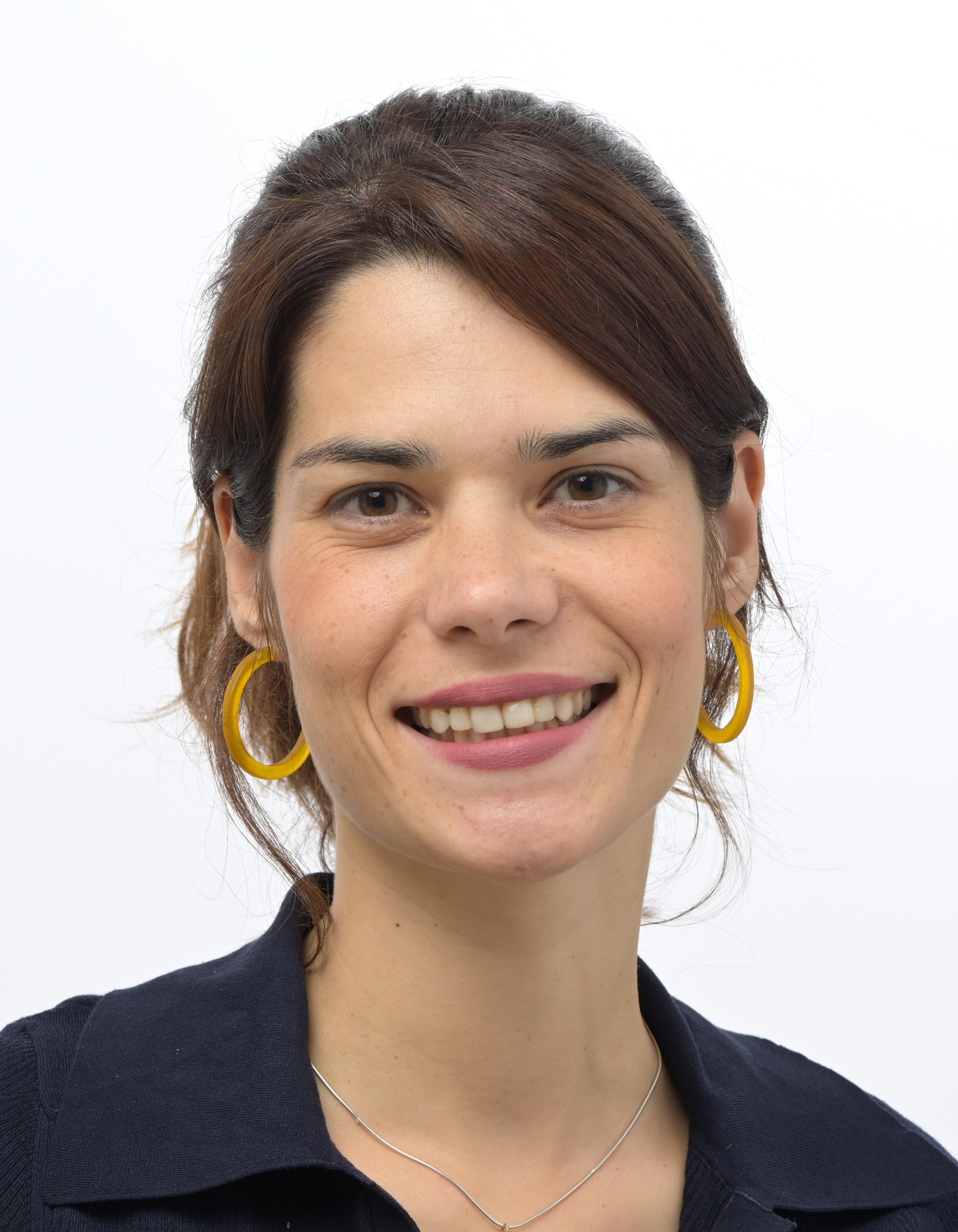

Member of the European Parliament for Spain
- Incumbent
- Assumed office 16 July 2024

Member of the Assembly of Madrid
- In office 9 June 2015 – 7 June 2021

Personal details
- Born: 15 August 1989 (age 36) Madrid, Spain
- Party: Podemos (2014–present)
- Other political affiliations: Anticapitalistas (2010–2015)
- Occupation: Activist, politician

Isabel Serra Sánchez (Spanish pronunciation: [isaˈβel ˈsera]; born 15 August 1989) is a Spanish activist and politician. She was a member of the Podemos Parliamentary Group in the Assembly of Madrid from 2015 to 2021.

== Biography ==
Born on 15 August 1989 in Madrid, the daughter of Fernando Serra, writer for Libertad Digital, she is also the younger sister of Clara Serra, feminist writer and philosopher.

In 2013, when she was part of the 15-M Movement, she appeared in the 4th episode of the first season of the TV series Vice of HBO: Chinese Cock-block & European Meltdown. In that episode Serra and other young people can be seen sabotaging bank ATMs and making graffiti. The video resurfaced when she was elected to one of Unidas Podemos' seats for the Assembly of the Autonomous Community of Madrid in 2019.

She graduated in philosophy and later took a master's in economics. She participated in the student movement against the Bologna Process during her university spell and was a founder of the Juventud Sin Futuro collective; she also participated in the 15M protests.

Part of Podemos since the beginnings of the party in 2014 at the Teatro del Barrio, Serra ran 16th in the Podemos list for the 2015 Madrilenian regional election, and became a member of the 10th term of the regional legislature. Her sister Clara was elected in the same election, also on the Podemos list. A representative in Madrid of the anticapitalista minority faction within Podemos, she ran in the December 2017 primaries for the party leadership in the city of Madrid, where she was defeated by the mainstream candidature led by Julio Rodríguez.

On 27 April 2018, Serra announced her discharge from Anticapitalistas, alleging "discrepancies with some political and strategic decisions".

In March 2019 she announced during an event programmed in Vallecas her intention to bid to head the list of Podemos in the 2019 Madrilenian regional election. She comfortably won the primary election with an 80.5% support, while she made public the "will" of the organization to merge with United Left-Madrid vis-à-vis the election; the later were yet to decide if they accepted the proposal.

A coalition between Podemos, IU-Madrid and Anticapitalistas Madrid under the name "Unidas Podemos Izquierda Unida Madrid en Pie" was registered at the last minutes before the deadline at the midnight between 12 and 13 April 2019, and thus Serra subsequently ran 1st in the electoral list of the coalition. The list obtained 7 seats.

Serra was accused in 2018 of a misdemeanor of "public disorders" as she took part in an anti-eviction protest in 2014. She decided to ask for the removal of her parliamentary immunity in February 2018 to face the judicial procedure. However, as the deeds were done before she was sworn into office, the immunity would not have effect either way. (Note: She declared "I want to be judged in the same situation that all people who have been judged because of having demonstrated against the eviction drama, a struggle I am very proud of".) In April 2020, she was found guilty and sentenced to 19 months in prison.
