= 1995 Madrilenian regional election =

Election in the Spanish region of Madrid

- 28 May 1995

All 103 seats in the Assembly of Madrid 52 seats needed for a majority
- Opinion polls
- Registered: 4,129,852 ▲7.6%
- Turnout: 2,907,141 (70.4%) ▲11.7 pp
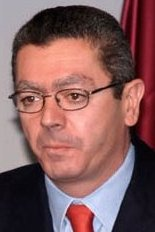

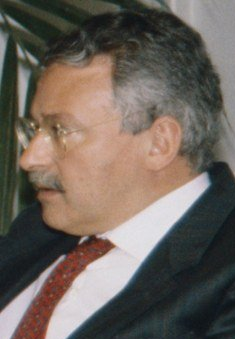

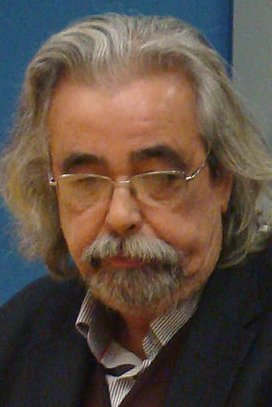
| | First party | Second party | Third party |
|---|---|---|---|
| Leader | Alberto Ruiz-Gallardón | Joaquín Leguina | Ángel Pérez |
| Party | PP | PSOE | IU |
| Leader since | 8 February 1987 | 14 December 1979 | 24 February 1993 |
| Last election | 47 seats, 42.7% | 41 seats, 36.6% | 13 seats, 12.1% |
| Seats won | 54 | 32 | 17 |
| Seat change | ▲7 | ▼9 | ▲4 |
| Popular vote | 1,476,442 | 860,726 | 464,167 |
| Percentage | 51.0% | 29.7% | 16.0% |
| Swing | ▲8.3 pp | ▼6.9 pp | ▲3.9 pp |
President before election
Joaquín Leguina
PSOE
President after election
Alberto Ruiz-Gallardón
PP

A regional election was held in the Community of Madrid on 28 May 1995 to elect the 4th Assembly of the autonomous community. All 103 seats in the Assembly were up for election. It was held concurrently with regional elections in twelve other autonomous communities and local elections all across Spain.

The election resulted in the People's Party (PP) winning an absolute majority of votes and seats for the first time, which allowed Alberto Ruiz-Gallardón to become President and end 12 years of Spanish Socialist Workers' Party (PSOE) rule in the community. Joaquín Leguina's PSOE suffered from Prime Minister Felipe González's unpopularity at national level and fell below 30% for the first time in a regional election. The third party, United Left (IU), benefitted from the PSOE's decline and polled just over 16%, their highest vote share at a Madrid Assembly election to date.

== Overview ==
Under the 1983 Statute of Autonomy, the Assembly of Madrid was the unicameral legislature of the homonymous autonomous community, having legislative power in devolved matters, as well as the ability to grant or withdraw confidence from a regional president. The electoral and procedural rules were supplemented by national law provisions.

=== Date ===
The term of the Assembly of Madrid expired four years after the date of its previous ordinary election, with election day being fixed for the fourth Sunday of May every four years. The election decree was required to be issued no later than 54 days before the scheduled election date and published on the following day in the Official Gazette of the Community of Madrid (BOCM). The previous election was held on 26 May 1991, setting the date for election day on the fourth Sunday of May four years later, which was 28 May 1995.

The regional president had the prerogative to dissolve the Assembly of Madrid at any given time and call a snap election, provided that no motion of no confidence was in process, no nationwide election had been called and that dissolution did not occur either during the first legislative session or during the last year of parliament before its planned expiration, nor before one year after a previous one. In the event of an investiture process failing to elect a regional president within a two-month period from the first ballot, the Assembly was to be automatically dissolved and a fresh election called. Any snap election held as a result of these circumstances did not alter the date of the chamber's next ordinary election, with elected lawmakers serving the remainder of its original four-year term.

The election to the Assembly of Madrid was officially called on 4 April 1995 with the publication of the corresponding decree in the BOCM, setting election day for 28 May and scheduling for the chamber to reconvene on 22 June.

=== Electoral system ===
Voting for the Assembly was based on universal suffrage, comprising all Spanish nationals over 18 years of age, registered in the Community of Madrid and with full political rights, provided that they had not been deprived of the right to vote by a final sentence, nor were legally incapacitated.

The Assembly of Madrid had one seat per 50,000 inhabitants or fraction above 25,000. All were elected in a single multi-member constituency—corresponding to the autonomous community's territory—using the D'Hondt method and closed-list proportional voting, with a five percent-threshold of valid votes (including blank ballots) regionally. As a result of the aforementioned allocation, the Assembly was entitled to 103 seats, based on the official population figures resulting from the latest revision of the municipal register (as of 1 January 1994).

The law did not provide for by-elections to fill vacant seats; instead, any vacancies arising after the proclamation of candidates and during the legislative term were filled by the next candidates on the party lists or, when required, by designated substitutes.

=== Outgoing parliament ===
The table below shows the composition of the parliamentary groups in the chamber at the time of the election call.

Parliamentary composition in April 1995
| Groups | Parties | Legislators | |
| Groups | Parties | Seats | Total |
|---|---|---|---|
| People's Parliamentary Group | PP | 47 | 47 |
| Socialist Parliamentary Group | PSOE | 41 | 41 |
| United Left Parliamentary Group | IU | 13 | 13 |

== Parties and candidates ==
The electoral law allowed for parties and federations registered in the interior ministry, alliances and groupings of electors to present lists of candidates. Parties and federations intending to form an alliance were required to inform the relevant electoral commission within 10 days of the election call, whereas groupings of electors needed to secure the signature of at least 0.5 percent of the electorate in the Community of Madrid, disallowing electors from signing for more than one list.

Below is a list of the main parties and alliances which contested the election:

| Candidacy | Parties and alliances | Leading candidate | Ideology | Previous result | | Gov. | Ref. |
| Candidacy | Parties and alliances | Leading candidate | Ideology | Vote % | Seats | Gov. | Ref. |
|---|---|---|---|---|---|---|---|
| PP | List: People's Party (PP) | Alberto Ruiz-Gallardón | Conservatism; Christian democracy | 42.7% | 47 | No | |
| PSOE | List: Spanish Socialist Workers' Party (PSOE) | Joaquín Leguina | Social democracy | 36.6% | 41 | Yes | |
| IU | List: United Left (IU) | Ángel Pérez | Socialism; Communism | 12.1% | 13 | No | |

== Opinion polls ==
The tables below list opinion polling results in reverse chronological order, showing the most recent first and using the dates when the survey fieldwork was done, as opposed to the date of publication. Where the fieldwork dates are unknown, the date of publication is given instead. The highest percentage figure in each polling survey is displayed with its background shaded in the leading party's colour. If a tie ensues, this is applied to the figures with the highest percentages. The "Lead" column on the right shows the percentage-point difference between the parties with the highest percentages in a poll.

=== Voting intention estimates ===
The table below lists weighted voting intention estimates. Refusals are generally excluded from the party vote percentages, while question wording and the treatment of "don't know" responses and those not intending to vote may vary between polling organisations. When available, seat projections determined by the polling organisations are displayed below (or in place of) the percentages in a smaller font; 52 seats were required for an absolute majority in the Assembly of Madrid (51 in the 1991 election).

Color key:

Exit poll

| Polling firm/Commissioner | Fieldwork date | Sample size | Turnout | PP | PSOE | IU | LV | Lead |
|---|---|---|---|---|---|---|---|---|
| 1995 regional election | 28 May 1995 | —N/a | 70.4 | 51.0; 54 | 29.7; 32 | 16.0; 17 | – | 21.3 |
| Eco Consulting/RTVE | 28 May 1995 | ? | ? | 50.6; 54/55 | 26.4; 28/29 | 18.6; 19/21 | – | 24.2 |
| Demoscopia/El País | 10–15 May 1995 | 1,000 | ? | 51.1; 53/54 | 25.5; 27/28 | 20.3; 22/23 | – | 25.6 |
| CIS | 24 Apr–10 May 1995 | 1,395 | 72.6 | 51.5 | 27.6 | 15.9 | – | 23.9 |
| Tábula V/ABC | 19–25 Apr 1995 | 1,000 | ? | 50.0; 55 | 24.0; 26 | 20.0; 22 | – | 26.0 |
| Tábula V/ABC | 28 Nov–2 Dec 1994 | ? | ? | 47.0 | 19.0 | 23.0 | – | 24.0 |
| 1994 EP election | 12 Jun 1994 | —N/a | 49.9 | 50.3 (56) | 24.0 (26) | 19.6 (21) | – | 26.3 |
| Tábula V/ABC | 10–11 May 1994 | ? | ? | 48.0 | 24.0 | 23.0 | – | 24.0 |
| Demoscopia/El País | 10 Apr 1994 | ? | ? | 49.4; 50 | 23.6; 23 | 21.6; 21 | 5.4; 5 | 25.8 |
| 1993 general election | 6 Jun 1993 | —N/a | 78.9 | 43.9 (48) | 35.0 (38) | 14.6 (15) | 1.1 (0) | 8.9 |
| PP | 21 Feb 1993 | ? | ? | 51.0 | 30.0 | – | – | 21.0 |
| 1991 regional election | 26 May 1991 | —N/a | 58.8 | 42.7; 47 | 36.6; 41 | 12.1; 13 | 1.6; 0 | 6.1 |

== Results ==
=== Overall ===
← Summary of the 28 May 1995 Assembly of Madrid election results →
| Parties and alliances | Popular vote | | | Seats | |
| Parties and alliances | Votes | % | ±pp | Total | +/− |
|---|---|---|---|---|---|
| People's Party (PP) | 1,476,442 | 50.98 | +8.31 | 54 | +7 |
| Spanish Socialist Workers' Party (PSOE) | 860,726 | 29.72 | −6.87 | 32 | −9 |
| United Left (IU) | 464,167 | 16.03 | +3.96 | 17 | +4 |
| The Greens–Green Group (LV–GV) | 21,239 | 0.73 | New | 0 | ±0 |
| The Alternative Greens (LVA)^{1} | 10,638 | 0.37 | −0.03 | 0 | ±0 |
| Platform of Independents of Spain (PIE) | 5,368 | 0.19 | New | 0 | ±0 |
| Madrilenian Independent Regional Party (PRIM) | 3,136 | 0.11 | −0.24 | 0 | ±0 |
| United Extremadura (EU) | 2,379 | 0.08 | New | 0 | ±0 |
| Citizen Unity (UC) | 2,086 | 0.07 | New | 0 | ±0 |
| Revolutionary Workers' Party (POR) | 2,066 | 0.07 | −0.03 | 0 | ±0 |
| Communist Party of the Peoples of Spain (PCPE) | 2,053 | 0.07 | New | 0 | ±0 |
| Spanish Phalanx of the CNSO (FE–JONS) | 1,853 | 0.06 | New | 0 | ±0 |
| Humanist Platform (PH) | 1,834 | 0.06 | New | 0 | ±0 |
| Independent Regional Unity (URI) | 1,636 | 0.06 | New | 0 | ±0 |
| Independent Spanish Phalanx (FEI) | 1,060 | 0.04 | New | 0 | ±0 |
| Coalition for a New Socialist Party (NPS)^{2} | 731 | 0.03 | −0.05 | 0 | ±0 |
| Blank ballots | 38,763 | 1.34 | +0.05 | | |
| Total | 2,896,177 | | | 103 | +2 |
| Valid votes | 2,896,177 | 99.62 | +0.03 | | |
| Invalid votes | 10,964 | 0.38 | −0.03 | | |
| Votes cast / turnout | 2,907,141 | 70.39 | +11.72 | | |
| Abstentions | 1,222,711 | 29.61 | −11.72 | | |
| Registered voters | 4,129,852 | | | | |
Sources
Footnotes: ^{1} The Alternative Greens results are compared to Green Union totals in the 1991 election.; ^{2} Coalition for a New Socialist Party results are compared to Alliance for the Republic totals in the 1991 election.

Popular vote
| PP | 50.98% |
| PSOE | 29.72% |
| IU | 16.03% |
| Others | 1.94% |
| Blank ballots | 1.34% |

Seats
| PP | 52.43% |
| PSOE | 31.07% |
| IU | 16.50% |

=== Elected legislators ===
The following table lists the elected legislators sorted by order of election.

Elected legislators
| # | Name | List |
|---|---|---|
| 1 | Alberto Ruiz-Gallardón Jiménez | PP |
| 2 | Joaquín Leguina Herrán | PSOE |
| 3 | Rosa María Posada Chapado | PP |
| 4 | Pío García-Escudero Márquez | PP |
| 5 | Ángel Pérez Martínez | IU |
| 6 | Jaime Lissavetzky Díez | PSOE |
| 7 | Antonio Germán Beteta Barreda ^{(es)} | PP |
| 8 | Jesús Pedroche Nieto ^{(es)} | PP |
| 9 | Francisco Cabaco López ^{(ca)} | PSOE |
| 10 | Juan Van-Halen Acedo | PP |
| 11 | Virginia Díaz Sanz | IU |
| 12 | Dolores García-Hierro Caraballo | PSOE |
| 13 | Manuel Cobo Vega | PP |
| 14 | María del Carmen Álvarez-Arenas Cisneros | PP |
| 15 | Jorge Gómez Moreno | PSOE |
| 16 | Pedro Luis Calvo y Poch ^{(es)} | PP |
| 17 | Adolfo de Luxán Meléndez ^{(es)} | IU |
| 18 | María Teresa de Lara Carbó ^{(es)} | PP |
| 19 | Pedro Feliciano Sabando Suárez ^{(es)} | PSOE |
| 20 | Pedro Núñez Morgades ^{(es)} | PP |
| 21 | Luis María Huete Morillo ^{(es)} | PP |
| 22 | Alejandro Lucas Fernández Martín | PSOE |
| 23 | María Luisa Sánchez Peral | IU |
| 24 | José López López | PP |
| 25 | María Helena Almazán Vicario | PSOE |
| 26 | José Martín Crespo Díaz | PP |
| 27 | Francisco Javier Rodríguez Rodríguez ^{(es)} | PP |
| 28 | Carmen Ferrero Torres ^{(es)} | PSOE |
| 29 | Mariano Gamo Sánchez | IU |
| 30 | Cristina Cifuentes Cuencas | PP |
| 31 | Carlos María Mayor Oreja ^{(es)} | PP |
| 32 | Juan Antonio Barrios de Penagos | PSOE |
| 33 | Ismael Bardisa Jordá ^{(es)} | PP |
| 34 | Juan Antonio Ruiz Castillo | PSOE |
| 35 | Tomás Pedro Burgos Beteta ^{(fr)} | PP |
| 36 | Juan Ramón Sanz Arranz | IU |
| 37 | Sandra Sue Myers Brown | PP |
| 38 | Ramón Espinar Gallego | PSOE |
| 39 | José Antonio Bermúdez de Castro Fernández | PP |
| 40 | Luis Manuel Partida Brunete | PP |
| 41 | Adolfo Gilaberte Fernández | IU |
| 42 | Virgilio Cano de Lope ^{(es)} | PSOE |
| 43 | José María Román Ugarte | PP |
| 44 | Fermín Lucas Giménez | PP |
| 45 | Adolfo Piñedo Simal ^{(es)} | PSOE |
| 46 | María Teresa García-Siso Pardo | PP |
| 47 | Juan Antonio Candil Martín | PP |
| 48 | Ginés Meléndez González | PSOE |
| 49 | José María de Federico Corral | PP |
| 50 | Roberto Sanz Pinacho | PP |
| 51 | Eulalia García Sánchez | PSOE |
| 52 | Cándida O'Shea Suárez Inclán | PP |
| 53 | Miguel Ángel Bilbatúa Pérez | IU |
| 54 | Juan Soler-Espiauba Gallo ^{(es)} | PP |
| 55 | Elena Vázquez Menéndez ^{(es)} | PSOE |
| 56 | Fernando Utande Martínez | PP |
| 57 | Fernando Abad Bécquer ^{(es)} | PSOE |
| 58 | Juan Andrés Naranjo Escobar | PP |
| 59 | Marina María González Izquierdo | IU |
| 60 | Pedro Argüelles Salaverría ^{(es)} | PP |
| 61 | Antonio Chazarra Montiel | PSOE |
| 62 | Pilar Busó Borús ^{(d)} | PP |
| 63 | Luis Ángel Gutiérrez-Vierna Espada | PP |
| 64 | Miryam Alvarez Páez | PSOE |
| 65 | Julio Setién Martínez | IU |
| 66 | Victorino Ramón Rosón Ferreiro | PP |
| 67 | Jesús Adriano Valverde Bocanegra | PP |
| 68 | Agapito Ramos Cuenca ^{(es)} | PSOE |
| 69 | Alejandro Sanz Peinado | PP |
| 70 | Modesto Nolla Estrada ^{(d)} | PSOE |
| 71 | Blanca Nieves de la Cierva de Hoces | PP |
| 72 | José Nieto Cicuéndez | IU |
| 73 | José Luis Álvarez de Francisco | PP |
| 74 | Luis Miguel Maza Alcázar | PSOE |
| 75 | Paloma Fernández-Fontecha Torres | PP |
| 76 | María Gador Ongil Cores ^{(es)} | PP |
| 77 | Armando García Martínez | PSOE |
| 78 | Luis Miguel Sánchez Seseña | IU |
| 79 | Jorge Tapia Sáez | PP |
| 80 | María Luz Martln Barrios | PSOE |
| 81 | Tomás Casado González | PP |
| 82 | Francisco Javier Espadas López-Terradas | PP |
| 83 | Jaime Ramón Ruiz Reig | IU |
| 84 | José Manuel Franco Pardo | PSOE |
| 85 | José Luis Moreno Casas | PP |
| 86 | Esteban Parro del Prado ^{(es)} | PP |
| 87 | Jesús Zúñiga Pérez-Lemaur | PSOE |
| 88 | Manuel Troitiño Pelaz | PP |
| 89 | Carlos Paíno Capón | IU |
| 90 | María Esther García Romero-Nieva | PP |
| 91 | Margarita Alba García | PSOE |
| 92 | Luis del Olmo Flórez | PP |
| 93 | María Isabel López Navarro | PSOE |
| 94 | Paloma García Romero ^{(d)} | PP |
| 95 | Luisa María Teresa Biehn Cañedo | IU |
| 96 | Sonsoles Trinidad Aboín Aboín ^{(d)} | PP |
| 97 | Saturnino Zapata Llerena | PSOE |
| 98 | Miguel Ángel Villanueva González ^{(es)} | PP |
| 99 | Pedro Muñoz Abrines ^{(d)} | PP |
| 100 | Javier Ledesma Bartret | PSOE |
| 101 | Benjamín Martín Vasco | PP |
| 102 | Julio Misiego Gascón | IU |
| 103 | Henar Corbi Murgui | PSOE |

== Aftermath ==
=== Government formation ===
Investiture; Nomination of Alberto Ruiz-Gallardón (PP)
| Ballot → | 28 June 1995 |
| Required majority → | 52 out of 103 |
| Yes: • PP (54) | 54 / 103 |
| No: • PSOE (32); • IU (17) | 49 / 103 |
| Abstentions | 0 / 103 |
| Absentees | 0 / 103 |

== Bibliography ==
- Ley Orgánica 3/1983, de 25 de febrero, de Estatuto de Autonomía de la Comunidad de Madrid (Organic Law 3/1983). Official State Gazette (in Spanish). 25 February 1983 [version as of 25 March 1994]. BOE-A-1983-6317.
- Ley Orgánica 5/1985, de 19 de junio, del Régimen Electoral General (Organic Law 5/1985). Official State Gazette (in Spanish). 19 June 1985 [version as of 24 March 1995]. BOE-A-1985-11672.
- Ley 11/1986, de 16 de diciembre, Electoral de la Comunidad de Madrid (Law 11/1986). Official State Gazette (in Spanish). 16 December 1986 [version as of 4 May 1995]. BOE-A-1987-4255.
- Ley 5/1990, de 17 de mayo, reguladora de la facultad de disolución de la Asamblea de Madrid por el Presidente de la Comunidad (Law 5/1990). Official State Gazette (in Spanish). 17 May 1990 [version as of 29 May 1990]. BOE-A-1987-4255.
- Decreto 30/1995, de 3 de abril, del Presidente de la Comunidad de Madrid, por el que se convocan elecciones a la Asamblea de Madrid (Decree 30/1995). Official State Gazette (in Spanish). 3 April 1995. BOE-A-1995-8144.
