= Ramón Espinar =

Ramón Espinar may refer to:

- Ramón Espinar Gallego (1954–2026), Spanish politician (PSOE)
- Ramón Espinar Merino (born 1986), son of the above, Spanish politician (Podemos)
