= José Ignacio Echeverría =

Spanish politician

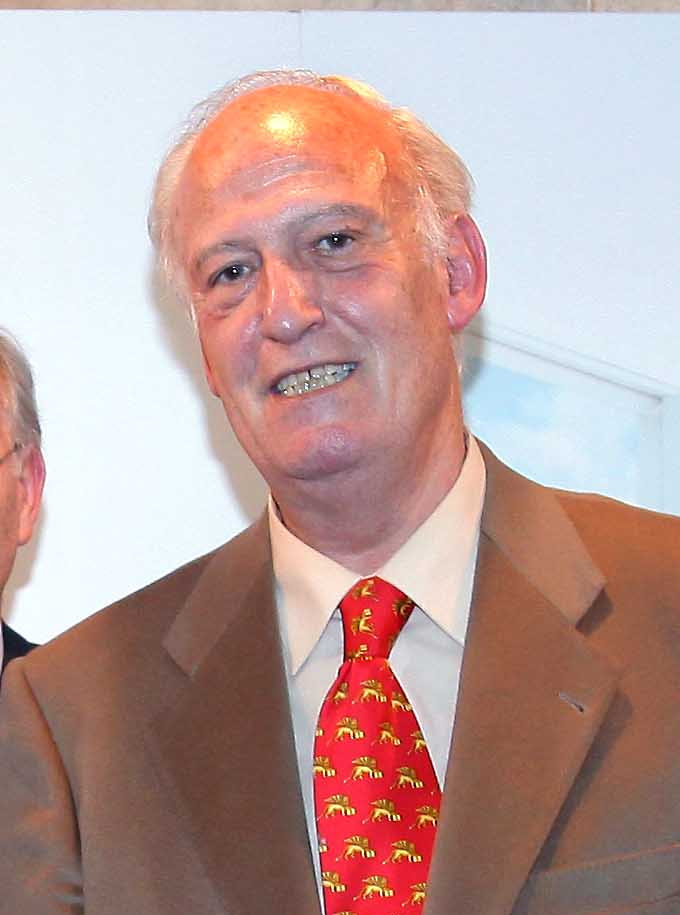
- In 2012

President of the Assembly of Madrid
- In office 7 June 2011 – 9 June 2015

Minister of Transportation of the Community of Madrid
- In office 26 June 2008 – 17 June 2011

Member of the Assembly of Madrid
- In office 30 June 1999 – 17 December 2015

Deputy Mayor of Madrid
- In office 1996–1999

Madrid City Councillor
- In office 27 February 1987 – 3 July 1999

Personal details
- Born: 8 February 1946 (age 79); Tangier
- Citizenship: Spanish
- Political party: People's Alliance (1981–1989); People's Party (since 1989)
- Occupation: Politician, lawyer, legal advisor

José Ignacio Echevarría Echániz (born 1946) is a Spanish politician active in the scope of Madrilenian politics. A former city councillor, member of the Assembly of Madrid and senator, he served as Minister of Transportation of the Government of the Community of Madrid (2008–2011) and chaired the regional legislature from 2011 to 2015.

== Early life ==
Born on 8 February 1946 in Tangier, Morocco, then an international zone. He graduated in Law and Business Administration at the ICADE, in Madrid. Before entering politics he also worked as lawyer and legal advisor.

== Municipal politics ==
Echeverría, who had joined People's Alliance (AP) on 24 September 1981, ran as candidate in the list of the AP–PDP–UL coalition for the 1983 Madrid municipal election but he was not elected then. Nonetheless, he became a member of the Madrid City Council later in the term, on 27 February 1987, covering a vacant seat. He renovated the seat in the May 1987 election, in which he had run 9th in the AP list. After the 1989 successful vote of no-confidence on Juan Barranco and the subsequent investiture of Agustín Rodríguez Sahagún as the new Mayor he became a member of the municipal government board, charged with the competences of Economy and Finance. Re-elected in 1991, he had powers in Urbanism during the first municipal government of José María Álvarez del Manzano. During his last term at the city council, between 1995 and 1999 he had competences in Traffic and Citizen Security, also becoming the first deputy Mayor in 1996, replacing Esperanza Aguirre.

Following problems in the municipal areas of government within his powers, such as the forging of signatures of municipal policemen, or a municipal by-law punishing people running in the street and people waiting for the bus outside of the shelter, the PP decided to remove him from government responsibilities and designate him a candidate to the 1999 regional election, with no intended executive responsibilities.

== Regional politics ==
Running 18th in the PP list for the 1999 elections to the Assembly of Madrid, Echeverría became a member of the 5th term of the regional legislature. He would subsequently renovate his seat in the May 2003, October 2003, 2007, 2011 and 2015 elections. Between 2005 and 2008, he also served as Senator, designated by the Assembly of Madrid.

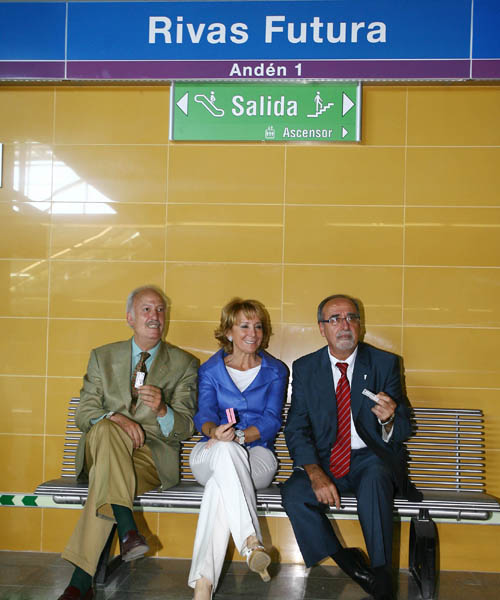
Echeverría holding a metro ticket in 2008 in company of Esperanza Aguirre and José Masa.

"Mr. Walker", as Echeverría is known in political circles, returned to executive responsibilities in 2008, following his appointment by Esperanza Aguirre as member of the Council of Government of the Community of Madrid, at the helm of the Ministry of Transportation, replacing Manuel Lamela in a cabinet reshuffle. He was sworn into office on 26 June 2008.

On 10 March 2011, during his mandate as Minister of Transportation, he wrongly stated in a parliamentary response to Socialist MP Modesto Nolla that the Metrobús (the popular 10-trip ticket for bus and rapid transit) "does not exist". Amid heavy criticism, Echeverría recognised it to be the worst "mistake" in his political career and handed in his resignation some days later, but the regional president Esperanza Aguirre did not accept it.

Following the formation of a new cabinet after the 2011 regional election Echeverría was removed from his post of Minister, replaced by Antonio Beteta. During the 9th term of the Assembly of Madrid (2011–2015) Echeverría chaired the presidency of the legislature. He was re-elected for his last term in the May 2015 regional election. In December 2015 he had a car accident while driving in Collado Villalba. He was measured an alcohol content of 0.65 mg/L of exhaled breath (well over the allowed rate of 0.25 mg/L). He resigned to his seat in the Assembly of Madrid on 17 December.

On 8 March 2017 he was called to declare by the judge Eloy Velasco as accused party for his alleged involvement in the Púnica corruption scheme.
