= List of presidents of the Assembly of Madrid =

President of the Assembly of Madrid
- Presidente de la Asamblea de Madrid
- Flag of the Community of Madrid

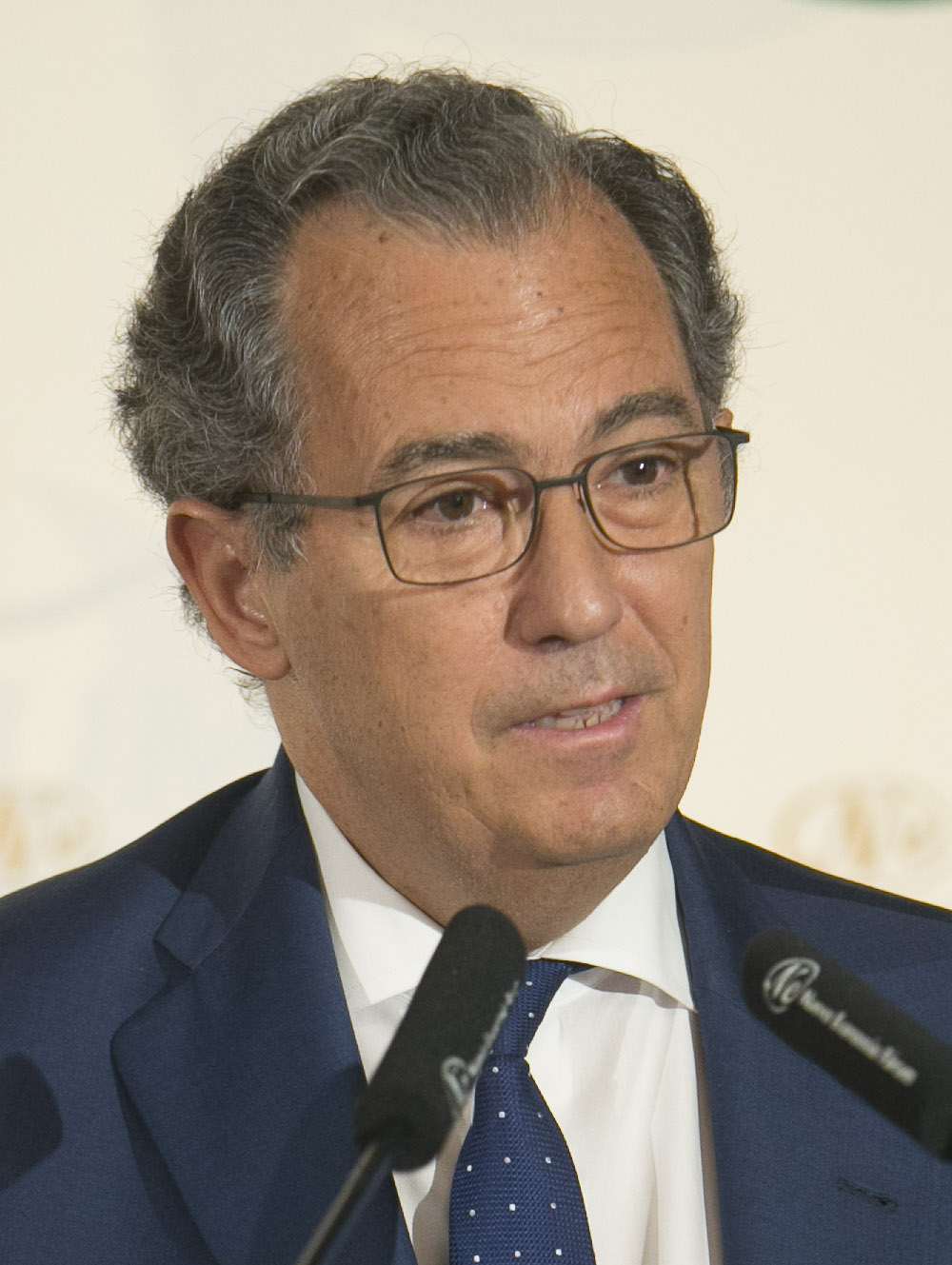
- Incumbent; Enrique Ossorio since 13 June 2023
- Member of: Assembly of Madrid
- Formation: 8 June 1983
- First holder: Ramón Espinar Gallego

This article lists the presidents of the Assembly of Madrid, the regional legislature of the Community of Madrid.

== Presidents ==
^{No.}	Name	Portrait	Parliamentary Group	Took office	Left office	^{Legs.}	^{Refs.}
1	Ramón Espinar Gallego		Socialist Parliamentary Group	8 June 1983	2 July 1987	1st	
2	Rosa Posada		Democratic and Social Centre Parliamentary Group	10 June 1987	1991	2nd	
3	Pedro Díez		United Left Parliamentary Group	20 June 1991	22 June 1995	3rd	
4	Juan Van-Halen		People's Parliamentary Group	22 June 1995	30 June 1999	4th	
5	Jesús Pedroche		People's Parliamentary Group	30 June 1999	10 June 2003	5th	
6	Concepción Dancausa		People's Parliamentary Group	10 June 2003	12 November 2003	6th	
6	Concepción Dancausa		People's Parliamentary Group	12 November 2003	11 June 2007	7th	
7	Elvira Rodríguez		People's Parliamentary Group	12 June 2007	7 June 2011	8th	
8	José Ignacio Echeverría		People's Parliamentary Group	7 June 2011	9 June 2015	9th	
9	Paloma Adrados		People's Parliamentary Group	9 June 2015	11 June 2019	10th	
10	Juan Trinidad		Citizens	11 June 2019	8 June 2021	11th	
11	Eugenia Carballedo		People's Parliamentary Group	8 June 2021	13 June 2023	12th	
12	Enrique Ossorio		People's Parliamentary Group	13 June 2023		13th	
