= List of legislative buildings =

A legislative building is referred to as a building in which a legislature sits and makes laws for its respective political entity. The term used for the building varies between the political entities, such as "building", "capitol", "hall", "house", or "palace", in the national language of that particular political entity.

== Supranational ==
=== Europe ===
Supranational Organisation	Legislative body	Image	Building	Built	Notes
European Union	European Parliament (lower house)		Espace Léopold	1995	The EU Parliament alternates its work between Brussels and Strasbourg
European Union	European Parliament (lower house)	European Parliament Strasbourg Hemicycle - Diliff	Louise Weiss	1999	The EU Parliament alternates its work between Brussels and Strasbourg
European Union	Council of the European Union (upper house)	494-R01	Europa building	2016	The Council of the EU shares its location with the European Council - a non-legislative body that acts as a "collective head of state" for the Union.

== National ==
=== Africa ===
Country	Image	Building	Built	Notes
Algeria		People's National Assembly building		A new parliamentary building is planned.
Angola		National Assembly Building	2015	National Assembly
Burundi		Kigobe Congress Palace	1962	National Assembly
Benin		National Assembly Building		National Assembly
Botswana		Parliament Building	1966	National Assembly of Botswana
Burkina Faso		National Assembly Building		The building was set alight during protests in October 2014.
Cameroon		National Assembly complex	2024	The former building was partially ravaged by a fire in 2017.
Chad		National Assembly Building		National Assembly
Democratic Republic of the Congo		Palais du Peuple	1979	
Djibouti		Assemblée Nationale	2014	National Assembly
Egypt		Parliament Building	2023	House of Representatives
Ethiopia		Ethiopian Parliament Building	1930s	A new Parliament Building is planned.
Ghana		Parliament House of Ghana	1965	
Guinea		Palais du Peuple	1970	
Guinea-Bissau		Palácio Colinas de Boé		National People's Assembly
Ivory Coast		Parliament Building		National Assembly
Kenya		Parliament Buildings	1950s	
Lesotho		Parliament Building	2012	Parliament of Lesotho
Liberia		Liberian Capitol Building		Legislature of Liberia
Malawi		National Assembly Building		National Assembly
Mali		Assemblée Nationale	1960s	National Assembly
Mauritius		Parliament House		National Assembly
Morocco		Palace of Parliament	20th century	Parliament of Morocco (The House of Representatives and House of Councillors)
Namibia		Tintenpalast	1913	Parliament of Namibia (National Council and National Assembly)
Nigeria		National Assembly Building	1991	House of Representatives and a Senate.
Senegal		National Assembly Building	1956	National Assembly
Sierra Leone		Sierra Leone House of Parliament	1961	
Somalia		Somalia Parliament Building		Seat of Federal Parliament of Somalia (Federal Government of Somalia) See also Old parliament building, Mogadishu
South Africa		Houses of Parliament	1884	Parliament of South Africa (National Assembly and National Council of Provinces)
Tanzania		National Assembly Building	2008	National Assembly
Tunisia		Parliament Building	1888	
Uganda		Parliament Building	1962	Parliament of Uganda
Zimbabwe		New Zimbabwe Parliament Building	2022	

=== Americas ===
Country	Image	Building	Built	Notes
Antigua and Barbuda		Parliament Building	2006	
Argentina		National Congress Palace	1906	
Bahamas		Bahamian Parliament Building	1815	
Barbados		Parliament Buildings	1874	
Belize		National Assembly Building	1971	
Bolivia		Palace of Congress	1905	
Brazil		National Congress Building	1960	
Canada		Canadian Parliament Buildings	1859	The Parliament of Canada's upper and lower houses are housed in Centre Block, the main building of the Canadian parliamentary complex. In 2019, the House of Commons was temporarily relocated to the complex's West Block and the Senate to the Senate of Canada Building, to accommodate the rehabilitation of Centre Block, which began in the same year.
Chile		National Congress Building	1976	See also the Former National Congress Building
Colombia		National Capitol of Colombia	1926	
Costa Rica		Legislative Assembly	1958	
Cuba		Palace of the Revolution	1957	Different from National Capitol of Cuba
Dominica		Parliament Building	1811	House of Assembly of Dominica
Dominican Republic		Palace of Congress	1955	Different from National Palace
Ecuador		Legislative Palace	1960	The seat of the National Assembly. Renovated 2008.
El Salvador		Legislative Assembly Building		The seat of the Legislative Assembly.
Guatemala		Legislative Palace	1934	Congress of the Republic of Guatemala
Guyana		Parliament Building	1834	
Honduras		National Congress Building	1954	
Jamaica		Gordon House	1960	A new parliamentary building is planned.
Mexico		Legislative Palace of San Lázaro	1981	Chamber of Deputies
Mexico		Senate Building	2011	Senate of the Republic
Nicaragua		National Assembly Building	1982	National Assembly
Panama		National Assembly Building	2013	National Assembly
Paraguay		Legislative Palace	2003	Congress of Paraguay
Peru		Legislative Palace	1936	
Suriname		National Assembly Building	1954	
Trinidad and Tobago		The Red House	1907	
United States		United States Capitol	1868	
Uruguay		Legislative Palace of Uruguay	1925	
Venezuela		Federal Legislative Palace	1872	

==== Dependencies ====
Country	Image	Building	Built	Notes
Puerto Rico		Capitol of Puerto Rico	1929	Legislative Assembly of Puerto Rico, the Senate and House of Representatives

=== Asia ===
Country	Image	Building	Built	Notes
Afghanistan		National Assembly Building	2015	National Assembly (dissolved)
Armenia		National Assembly Building	1947	National Assembly
Azerbaijan		National Assembly Building	20th century	National Assembly
Bangladesh		Jatiyo Sangsad Bhaban	1982	
Brunei		Legislative Council Building	2005	Legislative Council of Brunei
Cambodia		National Assembly Building	2007	National Assembly
China (People's Republic of China)		Great Hall of the People	1959	
East Timor		National Parliament Building	2002	National Parliament
Georgia		Georgian Parliament Building (Tbilisi)	1953	
India		Parliament House	2023	Old Parliament House was functional from 1927 to 2023.
Indonesia		DPR/MPR Building	1965	Planned as CONEFO Headquarter, but finished after CONEFO dissolved. Then repurposed as Parliamentary building complex in 1965, moved from the old Parliamentary building in Waterlooplein, now Lapangan Banteng, Jakarta. A new parliamentary building is being built in the new Capital and expected to be finished in 2028.
Iran		Majlis Building	2007	See also former building
Iraq		Baghdad Convention Centre	1980s	A new parliamentary building is planned.
Israel		Knesset	1966	
Japan		National Diet Building	1936	
Jordan		Jordanian Parliament	1980	Parliament of Jordan
Kazakhstan		Parliament House	2004	Kurultai (Kazakhstan)
Kuwait		Kuwait National Assembly Building	1982	Designed by Danish architect Jørn Utzon in 1972.
Kyrgyzstan		White House	1985	
Laos		National Assembly Building	1990	National Assembly of Laos
Lebanon		Parliament Building	1933	Parliament of Lebanon
Malaysia		Malaysian Houses of Parliament	1963	
Mongolia		Government Palace	1954	
Myanmar		Assembly of the Union	2005	
North Korea		Mansudae Assembly Hall	1984	
Oman		Council of Oman Building	2013	Council of Oman
Pakistan		Parliament House Building	1988	National Assembly, Senate
Philippines		Batasang Pambansa Complex	1978	House of Representatives; previously met at the Old Congress Building from 1926 to 1972, now the National Museum of Fine Arts.
Philippines		GSIS Building	1997	Senate; previously met at the Old Congress Building from 1926 to 1935, from 1949 to 1972, and from 1987 to 1997, now the National Museum of Fine Arts. A new building in planned.
Singapore		Parliament House	1999	
Sri Lanka		Parliament Building	1982	
South Korea		National Assembly Building	1975	
Taiwan (Republic of China)		Legislative Yuan Building	1919	Legislative Yuan
Tajikistan		Parliament House		Supreme Assembly
Thailand		Sappaya-Sapasathan	2019	The National Assembly of Thailand (Senate and House of Representatives). From 1932 to 1974 the legislature met at the Ananta Samakhom Throne Hall, 1974 to 2018 at the Parliament House of Thailand and 2018 at the TOT Public Company Limited.
Turkey		Grand National Assembly Building	1963	
Uzbekistan		National Assembly Building	2003	Legislative Chamber of Uzbekistan
Vietnam		National Assembly House	2009	

=== Europe ===
Country	Image	Building	Built	Notes
Albania		Albanian Parliament Building	1924	A new building is currently planned for the Albanian Parliament.
Andorra		New Parliament of Andorra	2014	General Council
Austria		Austrian Parliament Building	1883	Austrian Parliament
Belarus		Government House	1934	National Assembly of Belarus
Belgium		Palace of the Nation	1783	Belgian Federal Parliament (Chamber of Representatives and Senate)
Bosnia and Herzegovina		Parliament Building	1982	Parliamentary Assembly of Bosnia and Herzegovina
Bulgaria		National Assembly	1885	National Assembly
Croatia		Sabor Palace	1911	Sabor
Czech Republic		Thun Palace	1726	Chamber of Deputies
Czech Republic		Wallenstein Palace	1630	Senate
Denmark		Christiansborg Palace	1928	Folketing
Estonia		Toompea Castle	1922	Riigikogu; the oldest parts of Toompea Castle were built in the early 13th century and the newest parts in 1935. The Riigikogu hall building itself was added in 1922.
Finland		Parliament House	1931	Parliament of Finland
France		Palais Bourbon	1728	National Assembly
France		Luxembourg Palace	1615	Senate
Germany		Reichstag building	1894	Bundestag
Germany		Bundesrat Building	1904	Bundesrat
Greece		Old Royal Palace	1843	Hellenic Parliament
Hungary		Hungarian Parliament Building	1904	National Assembly
Iceland		Alþingishúsið	1881	Althing
Ireland		Leinster House	1748	Oireachtas (Dáil Éireann, Seanad Éireann)
Italy		Palazzo Montecitorio	1697	Chamber of Deputies
Italy		Palazzo Madama	1505	Senate of the Republic
Kosovo		Assembly Building		Assembly of the Republic of Kosovo
Latvia		Saeima Building	1867	Saeima
Liechtenstein		Landtagsgebäude	2008	Landtag
Lithuania		Seimas Palace	1980	Seimas
Luxembourg		Hôtel de la Chambre	1860	Chamber of Deputies
Malta		Parliament House	2015	Parliament of Malta
Moldova		Palace of the Parliament	1979	Parliament of Moldova
Monaco		Conseil national de Monaco	2012	National Council
Montenegro		Government Building	1954	Parliament of Montenegro
Netherlands		Binnenhof	13th century	States-General of the Netherlands (Senate and House of Representatives)
North Macedonia		Sobranie Palace	1938	Assembly of North Macedonia
Norway		Storting building	1866	Parliament of Norway
Poland		Sejm and Senate Complex	1928	Sejm and Senate
Portugal		São Bento Palace	1598	Assembly of the Republic
Romania		Palace of the Parliament	1997	Parliament of Romania (Chamber of Deputies and Senate)
Russia		State Duma building	1935	State Duma
Russia		Federation Council Building	1983	Federation Council
San Marino		Palazzo Pubblico	1894	Grand and General Council
Serbia		House of the National Assembly	1936	National Assembly
Slovakia		Parliament Building	1993	National Council
Slovenia		National Assembly Building	1959	Slovenian Parliament
Spain		Palace of the Parliament	1850	Congress of Deputies
Spain		Palacio del Senado	1814	Senate
Sweden		Parliament House	1905	Riksdag
Switzerland		Federal Palace of Switzerland	1902	Swiss Federal Assembly
Ukraine		Verkhovna Rada building	1939	Verkhovna Rada
United Kingdom		Palace of Westminster	1870	Parliament of the United Kingdom (The House of Lords and House of Commons)
Vatican City		Governor's Palace	1939	Pontifical Commission for Vatican City State

==== Dependencies ====
Country	Image	Building	Built	Notes
Faroe Islands		Løgting house	1856	Løgting
Gibraltar		Exchange and Commercial Library	1817	Gibraltar Parliament
Isle of Man		Legislative Buildings	1887	Tynwald (House of Keys, Legislative Council)
Jersey		States Chamber	1887	States Assembly
Guernsey		Royal Court		States of Guernsey

=== Oceania ===
Country	Image	Building	Built	Notes
Australia		Parliament House	1988	Parliament of Australia (Senate and House of Representatives)
Fiji		Government Buildings	late 1930s	Parliament of Fiji, Not used between 1987 and 2015
Kiribati		Parliament Building	2000	House of Assembly
Marshall Islands		Capitol Building	1994	Parliament of the Marshall Islands
Micronesia		Parliament Building		Parliament of the Federated States of Micronesia
Nauru		Parliament Building	1990s	Parliament of Nauru
New Zealand		Parliament Buildings	1922	Parliament of New Zealand (House of Representatives)
Palau		Olbiil Era Kelulau Capitol Building	2006	Palau National Congress, which also includes the Executive and Judiciary Buildings
Papua New Guinea		Parliament Building	1984	National Parliament of Papua New Guinea
Samoa		Parliament Building		Parliament of Samoa
Solomon Islands		Houses of Parliament	1993	National Parliament of Solomon Islands
Tonga		Parliament Building		Parliament of Tonga
Tuvalu		Parliament Building	2005	Parliament of Tuvalu
Vanuatu		Parliament Building	1991	Parliament of Vanuatu

== Sub-national ==
=== Australia ===
State / Territory	Image	Building	Built	Notes
New South Wales		Parliament House	late 1850s	Parliament of New South Wales (Legislative Council and Legislative Assembly)
Queensland		Parliament House	1867	Parliament of Queensland (Legislative Assembly)
South Australia		Parliament House	1874 to 1939	Parliament of South Australia (Legislative Council and House of Assembly)
Tasmania		Parliament House	1840	Parliament of Tasmania (Legislative Council and House of Assembly)
Victoria		Parliament House	1856 to 1929	Parliament of Victoria (Legislative Council and Legislative Assembly)
Western Australia		Parliament House	1904	Parliament of Western Australia (Legislative Council and Legislative Assembly)
Australian Capital Territory		Legislative Assembly Building	1961	Australian Capital Territory Legislative Assembly
Northern Territory		Parliament House	1994	Parliament of the Northern Territory (Legislative Assembly)

=== Belgium ===
Region / Community	Image	Building	Built	Notes
Brussels-Capital Region		Hôtel de Limminghe	1884	Parliament of the Brussels-Capital Region
Flemish Community		Hôtel des Postes et de la Marine	1905	Flemish Parliament
Flemish Region		Hôtel des Postes et de la Marine	1905	Flemish Parliament
French Community		Hôtel de Ligne	1777	Parliament of the French Community
German-speaking Community		Sanatorium	1917	Parliament of the German-speaking Community
Walloon Region		Hospice Saint-Gilles	1667	Parliament of Wallonia

=== China ===
Special administrative regions	Image	Building	Built	Notes
Hong Kong		Legislative Council Complex	2011	Legislative Council of Hong Kong
Macau		Macau Legislative Assembly Building	1999	Legislative Assembly of Macau

=== New Zealand ===
	Image	Building	Built	Notes
Cook Islands		Parliament Building		Parliament of the Cook Islands
Niue		Assembly Building		Niue Legislative Assembly
Tokelau		Parliament Building		General Fono

=== Portugal ===
Autonomous Region	Image	Building	Built	Notes
Azores		Legislative Assembly Building	1990	Legislative Assembly of the Azores
Madeira		Legislative Assembly Building	1987	Legislative Assembly of Madeira

=== Spain ===
Autonomous Community	Image	Building	Built	Notes
Andalusia		Hospital de las Cinco Llagas	1558	Parliament of Andalusia
Aragon		Aljafería Palace	11th c.	Cortes of Aragon
Asturias		Palacio Regional	1911	General Assembly of the Principality of Asturias
Balearic Islands		Former Seat of the Círculo Mallorquín	1860	Parliament of the Balearic Islands
Basque Country		Former Ramiro de Maeztu High School	1855	Eusko Legebiltzarra
Canary Islands		Seat of the Parliament of the Canary Islands	1883	Parliament of the Canary Islands
Cantabria		Old Hospital of Saint Raphael	1791	Parliament of Cantabria
Castilla-La Mancha		Convento de San Gil	1610	Cortes of Castilla–La Mancha
Castile and León		Seat of the Cortes of Castile and León	2007	Cortes of Castile and León
Catalonia		Old Arsenal of the Citadel of Barcelona	1727	Parliament of Catalonia
Extremadura		Old Hospital of San Juan de Dios	17th c.	Assembly of Extremadura
Galicia		Pazo do Horreo	1915	Parliament of Galicia
La Rioja		Old Convent of Our Lady of Ransom	13th c.	Parliament of La Rioja
Madrid		Seat of the Assembly of Madrid	1998	Assembly of Madrid
Murcia		Former Culture House of Cartagena	1991	Regional Assembly of Murcia
Navarre		Former High Court of Pamplona	1890	Parliament of Navarre
Valencia		Palace of the Borgias	15th	Corts Valencianes

=== United Kingdom ===
Country	Image	Building	Built	Notes
Northern Ireland		Parliament Buildings	1933	Northern Ireland Assembly
Scotland		Scottish Parliament Building	2004	Scottish Parliament
Wales		Senedd Building	2006	Senedd
