= 1999 Madrilenian regional election =

Election in the Spanish region of Madrid

- 13 June 1999

All 102 seats in the Assembly of Madrid 52 seats needed for a majority
- Opinion polls
- Registered: 4,281,075 ▲3.7%
- Turnout: 2,606,325 (60.9%) ▼9.5 pp
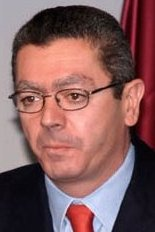

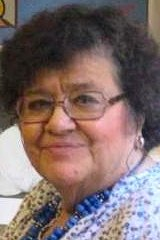

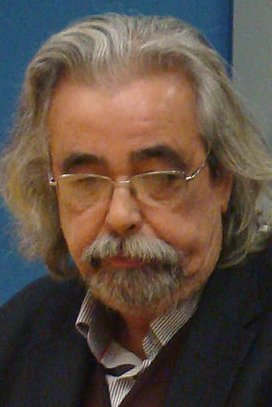
	First party	Second party	Third party
Leader	Alberto Ruiz-Gallardón	Cristina Almeida	Ángel Pérez
Party	PP	PSOE–p	IU
Leader since	8 February 1987	15 May 1998	24 February 1993
Last election	54 seats, 51.0%	32 seats, 29.7%	17 seats, 16.0%
Seats won	55	39	8
Seat change	▲1	▲7	▼9
Popular vote	1,324,596	944,819	199,488
Percentage	51.1%	36.4%	7.7%
Swing	▲0.1 pp	▲6.7 pp	▼8.3 pp
President before election
Alberto Ruiz-Gallardón
PP
President after election
Alberto Ruiz-Gallardón
PP

A regional election was held in the Community of Madrid on 13 June 1999 to elect the 5th Assembly of the autonomous community. All 102 seats in the Assembly were up for election. It was held concurrently with regional elections in twelve other autonomous communities and local elections all across Spain, as well as the 1999 European Parliament election.

While the People's Party (PP) of Alberto Ruiz-Gallardón was widely expected to win a second term and expand its absolute majority in the Assembly of Madrid—with opinion polls predicting a comfortable victory with as many as 59 seats—its gains ended up being minimal. The extremely low turnout, one of the lowest in a regional election, benefitted the opposition Spanish Socialist Workers' Party (PSOE) instead, which saw a strong performance as a result at the expense of the United Left (IU), which lost half of its votes and seats.

== Overview ==
Under the 1983 Statute of Autonomy, the Assembly of Madrid was the unicameral legislature of the homonymous autonomous community, having legislative power in devolved matters, as well as the ability to grant or withdraw confidence from a regional president. The electoral and procedural rules were supplemented by national law provisions.

=== Date ===
The term of the Assembly of Madrid expired four years after the date of its previous ordinary election, with election day being fixed for the fourth Sunday of May every four years, but a 1998 amendment allowed for regional elections held in May 1995 to be held concurrently with European Parliament elections, provided that they were scheduled for within a four month-timespan. The election decree was required to be issued no later than 54 days before the scheduled election date and published on the following day in the Official Gazette of the Community of Madrid (BOCM). The previous election was held on 28 May 1995, setting the date for election day concurrently with that year's European Parliament election on 13 June 1999.

The regional president had the prerogative to dissolve the Assembly of Madrid at any given time and call a snap election, provided that no motion of no confidence was in process, no nationwide election had been called and that dissolution did not occur either during the first legislative session or during the last year of parliament before its planned expiration, nor before one year after a previous one. In the event of an investiture process failing to elect a regional president within a two-month period from the first ballot, the Assembly was to be automatically dissolved and a fresh election called. Any snap election held as a result of these circumstances did not alter the date of the chamber's next ordinary election, with elected lawmakers serving the remainder of its original four-year term.

The election to the Assembly of Madrid was officially called on 20 April 1999 with the publication of the corresponding decree in the BOCM, setting election day for 13 June and scheduling for the chamber to reconvene on 30 June.

=== Electoral system ===
Voting for the Assembly was based on universal suffrage, comprising all Spanish nationals over 18 years of age, registered in the Community of Madrid and with full political rights, provided that they had not been deprived of the right to vote by a final sentence, nor were legally incapacitated.

The Assembly of Madrid had one seat per 50,000 inhabitants or fraction above 25,000. All were elected in a single multi-member constituency—corresponding to the autonomous community's territory—using the D'Hondt method and closed-list proportional voting, with a five percent-threshold of valid votes (including blank ballots) regionally. As a result of the aforementioned allocation, the Assembly was entitled to 102 seats, based on the official population figures resulting from the latest revision of the municipal register (as of 1 January 1998).

The law did not provide for by-elections to fill vacant seats; instead, any vacancies arising after the proclamation of candidates and during the legislative term were filled by the next candidates on the party lists or, when required, by designated substitutes.

=== Outgoing parliament ===
The table below shows the composition of the parliamentary groups in the chamber at the time of the election call.

Parliamentary composition in April 1999
Groups	Parties	Legislators	
Groups	Parties	Seats	Total
People's Parliamentary Group	PP	54	54
Socialist Parliamentary Group	PSOE	32	32
United Left Parliamentary Group	IU	16	16
Mixed Parliamentary Group	PDNI	1 (Note: José Luis Nieto, former IU legislator.)	1

== Parties and candidates ==
The electoral law allowed for parties and federations registered in the interior ministry, alliances and groupings of electors to present lists of candidates. Parties and federations intending to form an alliance were required to inform the relevant electoral commission within 10 days of the election call, whereas groupings of electors needed to secure the signature of at least 0.5 percent of the electorate in the Community of Madrid, disallowing electors from signing for more than one list.

Below is a list of the main parties and alliances which contested the election:

Candidacy	Parties and alliances	Leading candidate	Ideology	Previous result		Gov.	Ref.
Candidacy	Parties and alliances	Leading candidate	Ideology	Vote %	Seats	Gov.	Ref.
PP	List: People's Party (PP)	Alberto Ruiz-Gallardón	Conservatism; Christian democracy	51.0%	54	Yes	
PSOE–p	List: Spanish Socialist Workers' Party (PSOE); Democratic Party of the New Left (PDNI)	Cristina Almeida	Social democracy	29.7%	32	No	
IU	List: United Left (IU)	Ángel Pérez	Socialism; Communism	16.0%	17	No	

== Opinion polls ==
The tables below list opinion polling results in reverse chronological order, showing the most recent first and using the dates when the survey fieldwork was done, as opposed to the date of publication. Where the fieldwork dates are unknown, the date of publication is given instead. The highest percentage figure in each polling survey is displayed with its background shaded in the leading party's colour. If a tie ensues, this is applied to the figures with the highest percentages. The "Lead" column on the right shows the percentage-point difference between the parties with the highest percentages in a poll.

=== Voting intention estimates ===
The table below lists weighted voting intention estimates. Refusals are generally excluded from the party vote percentages, while question wording and the treatment of "don't know" responses and those not intending to vote may vary between polling organisations. When available, seat projections determined by the polling organisations are displayed below (or in place of) the percentages in a smaller font; 52 seats were required for an absolute majority in the Assembly of Madrid.

Polling firm/Commissioner	Fieldwork date	Sample size	Turnout	PP	PSOE	IU	Lead
1999 regional election	13 Jun 1999	—N/a	60.9	51.1; 55	36.4; 39	7.7; 8	14.7
Sigma Dos/El Mundo	27 May–2 Jun 1999	800	?	53.3; 56/57	31.8; 33/34	11.7; 12	21.5
Eco Consulting/ABC	24 May–2 Jun 1999	?	?	51.8; 56/57	27.2; 29/30	16.2; 16/17	24.6
Demoscopia/El País	26 May–1 Jun 1999	?	67	55.4; 57	32.5; 34	11.1; 11	22.9
CIS	3–19 May 1999	1,200	69.0	56.2; 58/59	27.4; 29/30	13.2; 13/14	28.8
Tele 5	4 May 1999	?	?	? 56	? 34	? 12	?
Demoscopia/CEIM	12–26 Apr 1999	?	?	52.3; 55	? 34	? 14	?
Demoscopia/CEIM	1 Mar 1999	?	?	? 55	? 35	? 13	?
Demoscopia/PDNI	21 Jan–1 Feb 1999	?	?	49.3; 53	37.6; 41	10.2; 11	11.7
Demoscopia/CEIM	16–27 Apr 1998	1,800	?	47.0	33.0	15.8	14.0
Demoscopia/CEIM (Note: Undecided and/or abstentionists excluded.)	16–24 Sep 1997	1,800	?	49.9; 55	34.3; 36	13.2; 13	15.6
Sigma Dos/Cámara de Comercio	27 Nov 1996	?	?	49.2; 52/54	30.6; 31/33	17.3; 17	18.6
1996 general election	3 Mar 1996	—N/a	79.6	49.3 (53)	31.4 (33)	16.4 (17)	17.9
Sigma Dos/Cámara de Comercio	26 Sep–1 Oct 1995	1,500	?	52.1; 54/56	28.0; 30/31	16.5; 17/18	24.1
1995 regional election	28 May 1995	—N/a	70.4	51.0; 54	29.7; 32	16.0; 17	21.3

=== Voting preferences ===
The table below lists raw, unweighted voting preferences.

Polling firm/Commissioner	Fieldwork date	Sample size	PP	PSOE	IU	Question	X mark	Lead
1999 regional election (Note: Does not include non-resident citizens.)	13 Jun 1999	—N/a	31.0	22.1	4.7	—N/a	38.1	8.9
CIS	3–19 May 1999	1,200	36.1	19.0	8.7	24.2	8.9	17.1
1996 general election	3 Mar 1996	—N/a	39.4	25.1	13.2	—N/a	19.8	14.3
1995 regional election	28 May 1995	—N/a	35.9	21.0	11.3	—N/a	28.9	14.9

=== Victory preferences ===
The table below lists opinion polling on the victory preferences for each party in the event of a regional election taking place.

Polling firm/Commissioner	Fieldwork date	Sample size	PP	PSOE	IU	Other/ None	Question	Lead
CIS	3–19 May 1999	1,200	38.3	22.7	10.5	2.5	26.1	15.6

=== Victory likelihood ===
The table below lists opinion polling on the perceived likelihood of victory for each party in the event of a regional election taking place.

Polling firm/Commissioner	Fieldwork date	Sample size	PP	PSOE	IU	Other/ None	Question	Lead
CIS	3–19 May 1999	1,200	71.1	6.3	0.3	0.1	22.2	64.8

=== Preferred President ===
The table below lists opinion polling on leader preferences to become president of the Community of Madrid.

Polling firm/Commissioner	Fieldwork date	Sample size				Other/ None/ Not care	Question	Lead
Polling firm/Commissioner	Fieldwork date	Sample size	Gallardón PP	Almeida PSOE	Pérez IU	Other/ None/ Not care	Question	Lead
CIS	3–19 May 1999	1,200	44.3	27.6	3.7	3.8	20.6	16.7

== Results ==
=== Overall ===
← Summary of the 13 June 1999 Assembly of Madrid election results →
Parties and alliances	Popular vote			Seats	
Parties and alliances	Votes	%	±pp	Total	+/−
People's Party (PP)	1,324,596	51.07	+0.09	55	+1
Spanish Socialist Workers' Party–Progressives (PSOE–p)	944,819	36.43	+6.71	39	+7
United Left (IU)	199,488	7.69	−8.34	8	−9
The Greens (LV)	17,793	0.69	New	0	±0
The Greens–Green Group (LV–GV)	15,597	0.60	−0.13	0	±0
Centrist Union–Democratic and Social Centre (UC–CDS)	8,379	0.32	New	0	±0
The Phalanx (FE)	3,810	0.15	New	0	±0
Communist Party of the Peoples of Spain (PCPE)	3,109	0.12	+0.05	0	±0
Spanish Democratic Party (PADE)	2,686	0.10	New	0	±0
Union Community of Madrid (UCMA)	2,532	0.10	New	0	±0
Humanist Party (PH)	2,492	0.10	+0.04	0	±0
Independent Spanish Phalanx (FEI)	2,349	0.09	+0.05	0	±0
Madrilenian Independent Regional Party (PRIM)	2,042	0.08	−0.03	0	±0
Citizen Unity (UC)	1,778	0.07	±0.00	0	±0
Commoners' Land–Castilian Nationalist Party (TC–PNC)	1,553	0.06	New	0	±0
Red–Green Party (PRV)	1,432	0.06	New	0	±0
Party of El Bierzo (PB)	1,415	0.05	New	0	±0
Natural Law Party (PLN)	1,393	0.05	New	0	±0
Federal Progressives (PF)	988	0.04	New	0	±0
Independent Regional Unity (URI)	903	0.03	−0.03	0	±0
Blank ballots	54,341	2.10	+0.76		
Total	2,593,495			102	−1
Valid votes	2,593,495	99.51	−0.11		
Invalid votes	12,830	0.49	+0.11		
Votes cast / turnout	2,606,325	60.88	−9.51		
Abstentions	1,674,750	39.12	+9.51		
Registered voters	4,281,075				

Popular vote
PP	51.07%
PSOE–p	36.43%
IU	7.69%
Others	2.71%
Blank ballots	2.10%

Seats
PP	53.92%
PSOE–p	38.24%
IU	7.84%

=== Elected legislators ===
The following table lists the elected legislators sorted by order of election.

Elected legislators
#	Name	List
1	Alberto Ruiz-Gallardón Jiménez	PP
2	María Cristina Almeida Castro	PSOE
3	Pío García-Escudero Márquez	PP
4	Jaime Lissavetzky Díez	PSOE
5	Rosa María Posada Chapado	PP
6	Antonio Germán Beteta Barreda ^{(es)}	PP
7	Francisco Cabaco López	PSOE
8	Luis Eduardo Cortés Muñoz ^{(es)}	PP
9	Helena Almazán Vicario	PSOE
10	Carlos María Mayor Oreja ^{(es)}	PP
11	Ángel Pérez Martínez	IU
12	Jesús Pedroche Nieto ^{(es)}	PP
13	Pedro Feliciano Sabando Suárez ^{(es)}	PSOE
14	María del Pilar Martínez López	PP
15	Carmen Martínez Ten ^{(es)}	PSOE
16	Silvia Enseñat de Carlos	PP
17	Pedro Díez Olazábal ^{(es)}	PSOE
18	Manuel Cobo Vega ^{(es)}	PP
19	Juan Van-Halen Acedo	PP
20	Jorge Gómez Moreno	PSOE
21	Julio César Sánchez Fierro	PP
22	Pilar García Peña	PSOE
23	María del Carmen Álvarez Arenas Cisneros	PP
24	José Guillermo Marín Calvo (Fernando Marín)	IU
25	Paloma García Romero ^{(d)}	PP
26	Enrique Echegoyen Vera	PSOE
27	Luis Manuel Partida Brunete	PP
28	Marcos Sanz Agüero ^{(es)}	PSOE
29	Pedro Luis Calvo Poch ^{(es)}	PP
30	Eduardo Tamayo Barrena ^{(es)}	PSOE
31	María Cristina Cifuentes Cuencas	PP
32	José Ignacio Echevarría Echániz	PP
33	Ana Arroyo Veneroso	PSOE
34	José López López	PP
35	Francisca Oller Sánchez	PSOE
36	Julio Setién Martínez	IU
37	José Martín Crespo Díaz	PP
38	Francisco Javier Rodríguez Rodríguez ^{(es)}	PP
39	Julián Revenga Sánchez ^{(es)}	PSOE
40	Luis Peral Guerra	PP
41	Adolfo Piñedo Simal ^{(es)}	PSOE
42	Jesús Fermosel Díaz ^{(es)}	PP
43	Elena Vázquez Menéndez ^{(es)}	PSOE
44	María Paloma Adrados Gautier ^{(es)}	PP
45	Carlos López Collado	PP
46	Alicia Acebes Carabaño	PSOE
47	José María Federico Corral	PP
48	María Luisa Sánchez Peral	IU
49	Antonio Chazarra Montiel	PSOE
50	Manuel Troitiño Pelaz	PP
51	Miguel Ángel Villanueva González ^{(es)}	PP
52	Francisco Garrido Hernández	PSOE
53	Miguel Ángel Pérez Huysmans	PP
54	Sagrario González Aceituno	PSOE
55	Colomán Trabado Pérez	PP
56	Modesto Nolla Estrada ^{(d)}	PSOE
57	Emilio Eusebio Sainz de Murieta Rodeyro	PP
58	Roberto Sanz Pinacho	PP
59	José Manuel Franco Pardo	PSOE
60	Luis María Huete Morillo ^{(es)}	PP
61	Caridad García Álvarez	IU
62	Alejandro Lucas Fernández-Martín	PSOE
63	María Gador Ongil Cores ^{(es)}	PP
64	Pedro Muñoz Abrines	PP
65	María Luz Martín Barrios	PSOE
66	Mario Utrilla Palombi ^{(d)}	PP
67	Óscar Iglesias Fernández	PSOE
68	Álvaro Moraga Valiente	PP
69	Carmen García Rojas	PSOE
70	Benjamín Martín Vasco	PP
71	María de la Paz González García	PP
72	María Luisa Álvarez Durante	PSOE
73	María Dolores Ruano Sánchez	IU
74	Antonio Hernández Guardia	PP
75	Dolores Rodríguez Gabucio	PSOE
76	Elena González Moñux	PP
77	Luis del Olmo Flórez ^{(d)}	PP
78	Encarnación Moya Nieto	PSOE
79	Pilar Busó Borús ^{(d)}	PP
80	Antonio Fernández Gordillo	PSOE
81	José Manuel Berzal Andrade ^{(d)}	PP
82	Antonio Carmona Sancipriano ^{(es)}	PSOE
83	Esteban Parro del Prado ^{(es)}	PP
84	Victorino José Iriberri Haro	PP
85	Adolfo Navarro Muñoz	PSOE
86	Juan Ramón Sanz Arranz	IU
87	Francisco Vindel Lacalle	PP
88	Óscar Monterrubio Rodríguez	PSOE
89	José Cabrera Orellana	PP
90	Fernando Utande Martínez	PP
91	Eduardo Sánchez Gatell	PSOE
92	Blanca Nieves de la Cierva de Hoces	PP
93	Francisco Contreras Lorenzo	PSOE
94	Pablo Morillo Casals	PP
95	Álvaro Plaza Carpio	PSOE
96	María del Carmen Martín Irañeta	PP
97	José Luis Narros Manzanero	PP
98	Franco González Blázquez ^{(es)}	IU
99	Miguel Buenestado Expósito	PSOE
100	María del Pilar Liébana Montijano	PP
101	María Teresa Nevado Bueno	PSOE
102	Sonsoles Trinidad Aboín Aboín ^{(d)}	PP

== Aftermath ==
=== Government formation ===
Investiture; Nomination of Alberto Ruiz-Gallardón (PP)
Ballot →	7 July 1999
Required majority →	52 out of 102
Yes: • PP (55)	55 / 102
No: • PSOE (38); • IU (8)	46 / 102
Abstentions	0 / 102
Absentees: • PSOE (1)	1 / 102

== Bibliography ==
- Ley Orgánica 3/1983, de 25 de febrero, de Estatuto de Autonomía de la Comunidad de Madrid (Organic Law 3/1983). Official State Gazette (in Spanish). 25 February 1983 [version as of 8 July 1998]. BOE-A-1983-6317.
- Ley Orgánica 5/1985, de 19 de junio, del Régimen Electoral General (Organic Law 5/1985). Official State Gazette (in Spanish). 19 June 1985 [version as of 22 April 1999]. BOE-A-1985-11672.
- Ley 11/1986, de 16 de diciembre, Electoral de la Comunidad de Madrid (Law 11/1986). Official State Gazette (in Spanish). 16 December 1986 [version as of 13 July 1998]. BOE-A-1987-4255.
- Ley 5/1990, de 17 de mayo, reguladora de la facultad de disolución de la Asamblea de Madrid por el Presidente de la Comunidad (Law 5/1990). Official State Gazette (in Spanish). 17 May 1990 [version as of 29 May 1990]. BOE-A-1987-4255.
- Decreto 6/1999, de 19 de abril, del Presidente de la Comunidad de Madrid, por el que se convocan elecciones a la Asamblea de Madrid (Decree 6/1999). Official State Gazette (in Spanish). 19 April 1999. BOE-A-1999-8733.
