= Eugenia Carballedo =

Spanish politician (born 1971)

The Most Excellent Eugenia Carballedo
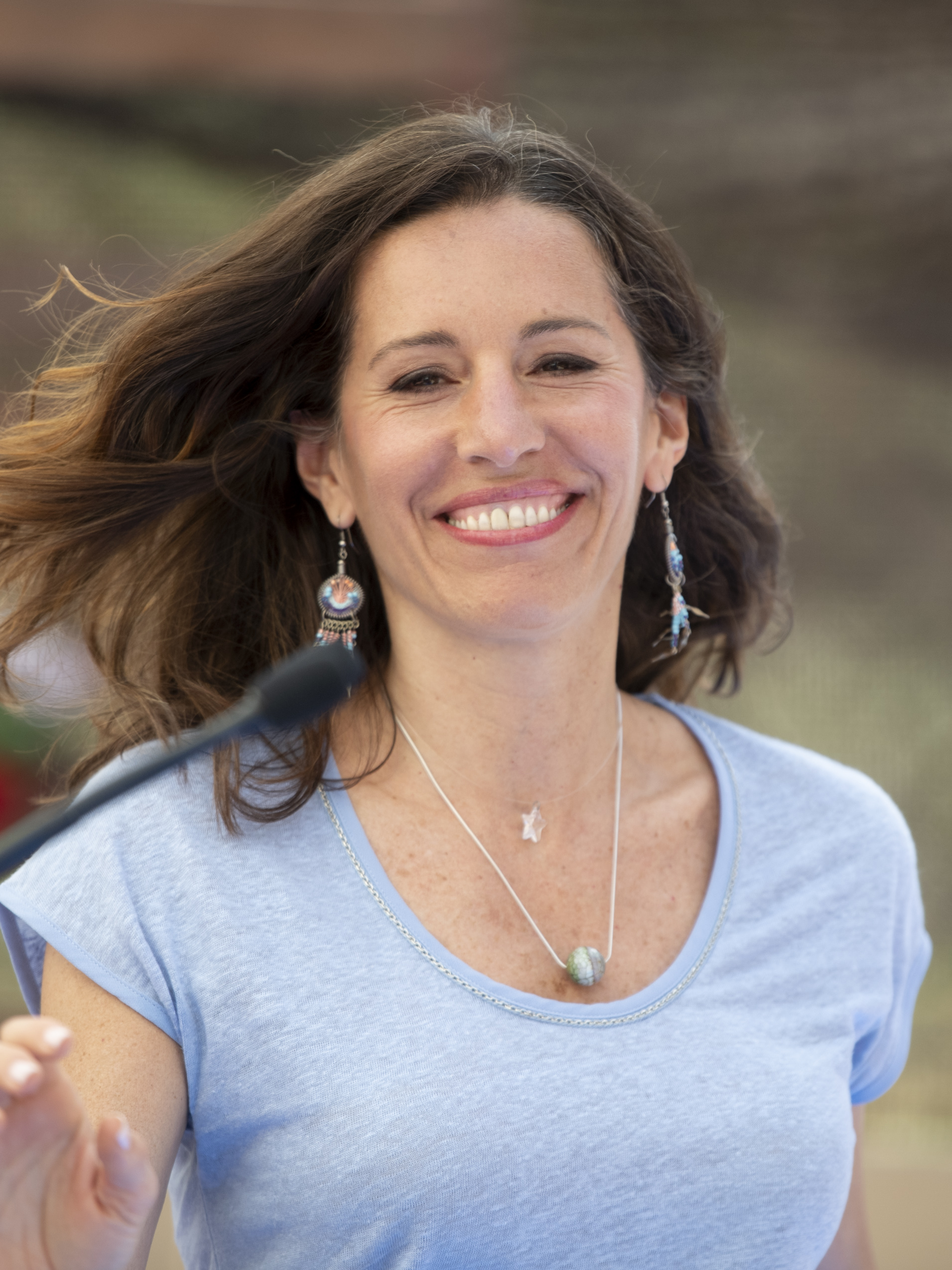
- Eugenia Carballedo

11th President of the Assembly of Madrid
- In office 8 June 2021 – 13 june 2023
- Vice President: Jorge Rodrigo
- Preceded by: Juan Trinidad
- Succeeded by: Enrique Ossorio

Minister of Sports and Transparency of the Community of Madrid
- Acting
- In office 11 March 2021 – 8 June 2021
- Monarch: Felipe VI
- President: Isabel Díaz Ayuso
- Preceded by: Ignacio Aguado
- Succeeded by: Marta Rivera de la Cruz

Minister of the Presidency of the Community of Madrid
- In office 20 August 2019 – 8 June 2021
- Monarch: Felipe VI
- President: Isabel Díaz Ayuso
- Preceded by: Pedro Rollán
- Succeeded by: Enrique Ossorio (acting)

Member of the Congress of Deputies
- In office 13 May 2008 – 6 June 2011
- Constituency: Madrid

Member of the Assembly of Madrid
- Incumbent
- Assumed office 7 June 2011

Personal details
- Born: María Eugenia Carballedo Berlanga; 4 September 1971 (age 55) Madrid, Spain
- Party: PP
- Education: Complutense University of Madrid

María Eugenia Carballedo Berlanga (born 4 September 1971) is a Spanish politician from the People's Party (PP), serving as a president of the Assembly of Madrid since 2021.

== Biography ==
Born in Madrid, Carballedo graduated in Law from the Complutense University of Madrid and obtained a Master's degree in European Law from KU Leuven. Carballedo worked in the office of the Ombudsman before becoming PP's executive secretary of Justice.

In May 2008, Carballedo was designated to fill the seat of Eduardo Zaplana in the Congress of Deputies after he resigned to join the board of directors of Telefónica. She didn't revalidate her seat in the X Legislature, instead opting to run in the 2011 Madrilenian regional election, as 29th in the PP party list. She was elected, and in 2014 she was named Deputy Minister of Employment of the regional government.

She was her party's nominee for mayor of Leganés in the 2015 municipal elections but didn't take possession after losing half of the council seats obtained in the 2011 election.

After the 2019 election, she was elevated to the post of Cabinet Minister of the Presidency of the Community of Madrid, also taking over as acting Cabinet Minister of Sports and Transparency in March 2021, following the expulsion of the Ciudadanos cabinet members from the government.

Following the dissolution of the Assembly and the 2021 snap election, Carballedo was elected President of the chamber with the support of Vox.

She was elected to the 15th Congress of Deputies in the 2023 Spanish general election from Madrid.
