= Ignacio Aguado =

Spanish politician

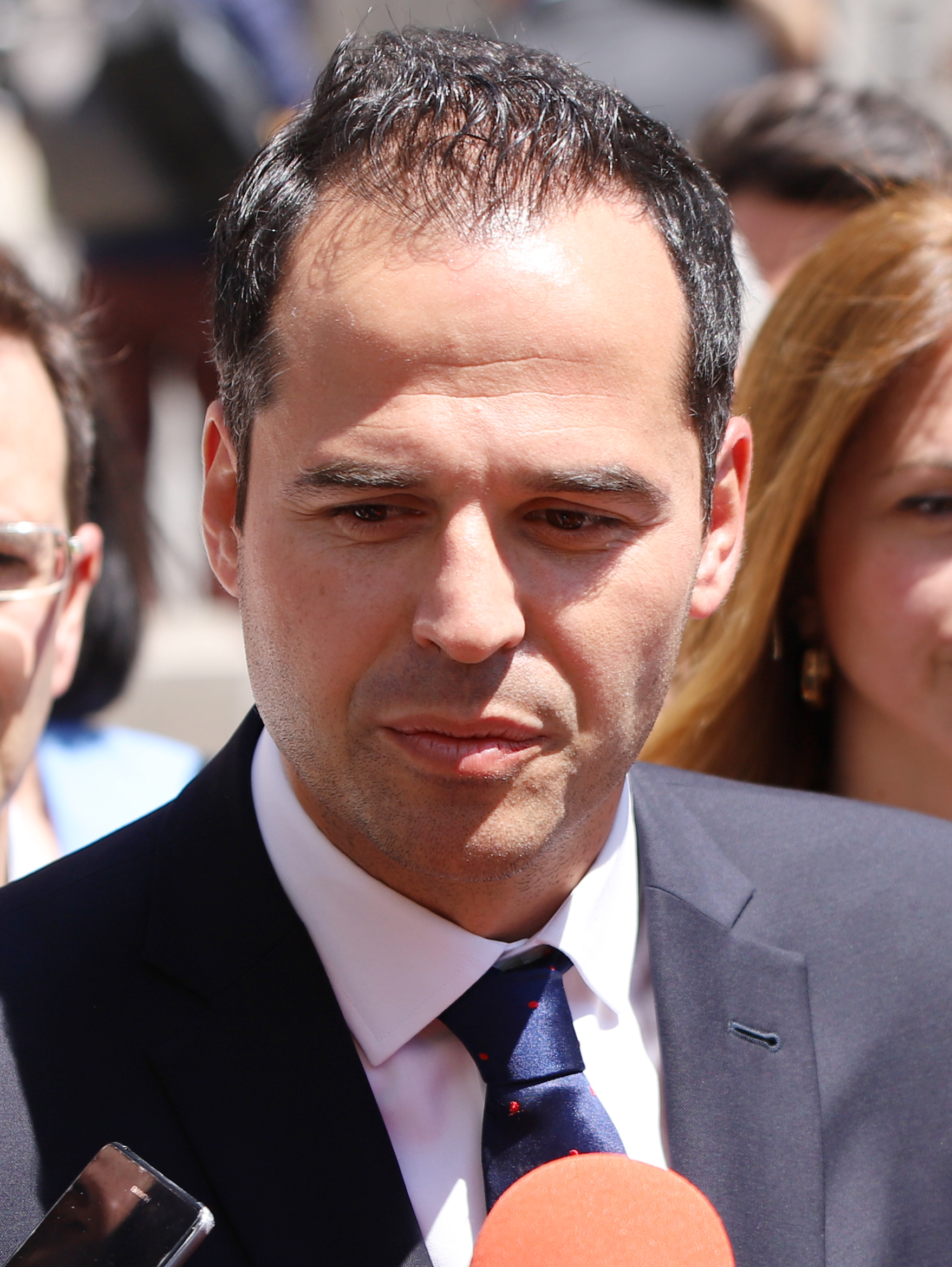

Vice President, Cabinet Minister of Sports and Transparency and Spokesperson of the Government of the Community of Madrid
- In office 20 August 2019 – 11 March 2021
- Monarch: Felipe VI
- President: Isabel Díaz Ayuso
- Preceded by: Pedro Rollán (Vice President and Spokesperson); Jaime de los Santos (Culture, Tourism and Sports)
- Succeeded by: Eugenia Carballedo (Sports and Transparency); Enrique Ossorio (Spokesperson)

Personal details
- Born: Ignacio Jesús Aguado Crespo; 23 February 1983 (age 43) Madrid, Spain
- Party: Cs
- Education: Comillas Pontifical University

Ignacio Jesús Aguado Crespo (born 23 February 1983) is a Spanish lawyer and politician from Citizens (Cs), serving as the party's spokesman in the Assembly of Madrid and as Vice President, Cabinet Minister of Sports and Transparency and Spokesperson of the Government of the Community of Madrid between 2019 and 2021.
