= Concepción Dancausa =

Spanish politician (born 1952)

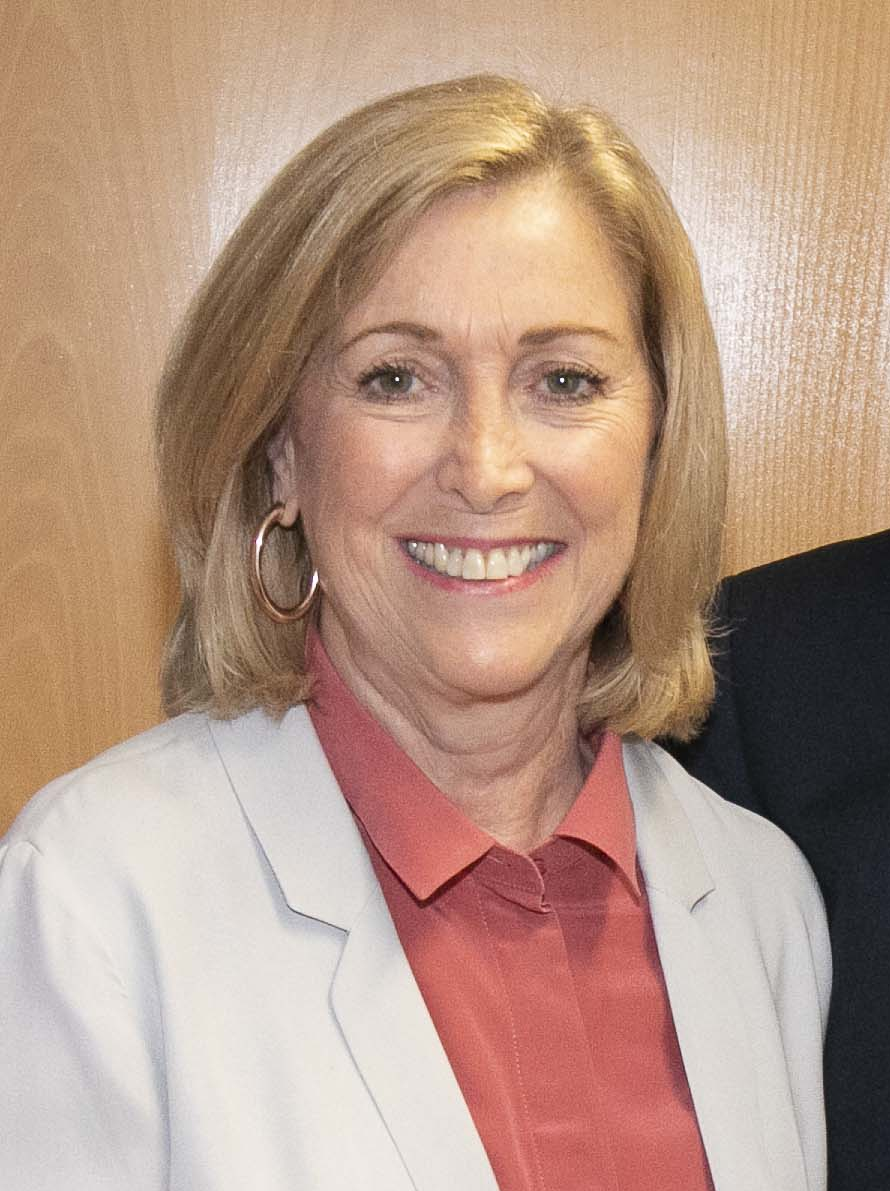
Dancausa in 2018

María Concepción Dancausa Treviño (born 26 February 1952) is a Spanish politician of the People's Party (PP).

She was a member of the Congress of Deputies in 2000, and a member of the Assembly of Madrid and its president from 2003 to 2007. From 2007 to 2015 she was a member of the City Council of Madrid, and the city's deputy mayor from 2013. From 2015 to 2018 she was the government delegate to the Community of Madrid, and from 2021 to 2023 she was a minister in the Government of the Community of Madrid.

== Early and personal life ==
Dancausa was born on 26 February 1952 in Burgos. Her father was Fernando Dancausa, mayor of Burgos and member of the Cortes Españolas during the Francoist era, and her sister María Dolores Dancausa is a banking executive.

Dancausa graduated with a law degree from the Complutense University of Madrid. She worked for seven years in Argentina, Paraguay and Panama. After returning, she held positions in the Ministry of Social Affairs, including director general of the Institute of Women and secretary general of the ministry.

== Political career ==
Dancausa was briefly a member of the Congress of Deputies in 2000 before returning to the Ministry of Social Affairs. In the May 2003 Madrilenian regional election, she was elected to the Assembly of Madrid in fourth on the People's Party (PP) list led by Esperanza Aguirre. Due to the Tamayazo affair in which two Spanish Socialist Workers' Party (PSOE) deputies rejected their party's pact with the United Left (IU), Dancausa was elected president of the Assembly, the position of speaker. A snap election in October led to a PP majority and Dancausa was again voted to the position.

In the 2007 Madrid municipal election, Dancausa was elected to Madrid City Council and took charge of social affairs in the local government of mayor Alberto Ruiz-Gallardón, and then the treasury in 2011 under his successor Ana Botella. In January 2013, she became deputy mayor, after the resignation of Miguel Ángel Villanueva due to a fatal stampede at Madrid Arena on Halloween.

Dancausa was named government delegate to the Community of Madrid in April 2015, succeeding Cristina Cifuentes. Ahead of the 2016 Copa del Rey final, in which FC Barcelona would play at the Vicente Calderón Stadium, she prohibited displays of the Estelada, the flag of the Catalan independence movement; the prohibition was revoked by a court. In July 2018, a judge dismissed a case brought by two councillors of Ahora Madrid, finding no evidence that Dancausa had committed fraud while in the city's treasury.

In June 2021, Isabel Díaz Ayuso named Dancausa as minister of family, youth and social policy in the Government of the Community of Madrid. She was tasked with enacting Ayuso's plans to increase the birth rate by supporting pregnant young people, and modernising residential care for the elderly that had been badly affected by the COVID-19 pandemic.

== Political views ==
Dancausa is described in the media as being part of the conservative faction of the PP. El País reported in 2021 that she used her Twitter account to share posts linking immigration and crime, from Vox politicians and Alvise Pérez. She opposes abortion and same-sex marriage.
