= Paloma Adrados =

Spanish politician (born 1957)

Paloma Adrados MP
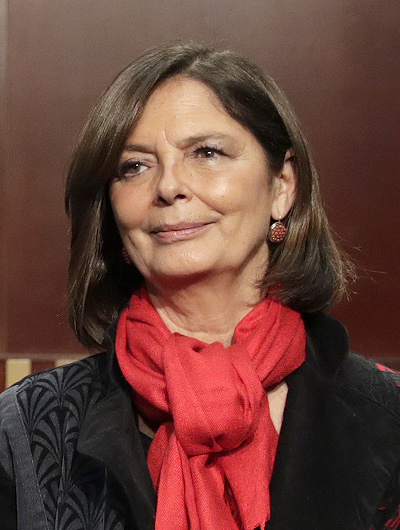

President of the Assembly of Madrid
- In office 9 June 2015 – 11 June 2019
- Preceded by: José Ignacio Echeverría
- Succeeded by: Juan Trinidad Martos

Personal details
- Born: April 16, 1957 (age 69) Madrid, Spain
- Party: People's Party
- Education: Complutense University of Madrid
- Occupation: Politician and lawyer
- Website: @Paloma_Adrados

María Paloma Adrados Gautier (born 16 April 1957) is a Spanish politician of the People's Party, mayoress of Pozuelo de Alarcón between 2011 and 2015, and, since then, president of the Madrid Assembly until 2019, when she became First Deputy President.

== Biography ==
After graduating in Law, she began working in the CEOE, taking responsibility for the International Labor Relations Area. After passing through the International Labour Organization as a consultant, She entered fully into politics, joining the ranks of the Popular Party (PP). Between 1997 and 1999 she worked under Javier Arenas, at that time Minister of Labor and Social Affairs, as an advisor. In 1999 she was elected regional deputy of the Assembly of Madrid, and occupied the position of first secretary of the board.

In June 2007 she was chosen by Esperanza Aguirre to replace Juan José Güemes at the head of the Ministry of Employment and Women of Government of the Community of Madrid.

In 2011, she was elected candidate of her party to run for mayor of the city of Pozuelo de Alarcón, reaching 61.9% of the votes in the May 2011 elections, being mayor on 11 June 2011

In 2015, she again attended the municipal elections of Pozuelo as a candidate, as well as the regional elections. His party lost 3 councilors in the municipal and although he maintained the majority, Adrados did not take possession and resigned from the act of councilor to assume the presidency of the Assembly of Madrid.
