= Ramón Espinar Gallego =

Spanish politician (1954–2026)

President of the Assembly of Madrid
- In office 8 June 1983 – 10 June 1987
- Preceded by: Office established
- Succeeded by: Rosa Posada

Mayor of Leganés
- In office 19 April 1979 – 6 September 1983
- Preceded by: José Manuel Matheo Luaces
- Succeeded by: Fernando Abad Bécquer

Personal details
- Born: 1954 Úbeda, Spain
- Died: 3 September 2026 (aged 72)
- Party: PSOE
- Children: Ramón Espinar Merino

Ramón Espinar Gallego (1954 – 3 September 2026) was a Spanish politician. A member of the Spanish Socialist Workers' Party (PSOE), he was the mayor of Leganés in the Community of Madrid, and a member of the Assembly of Madrid from 1983 to 1995, serving as its president from 1983 to 1987. He was the regional minister of culture (1987–1991) and finance (1991–1995). In 1995, he was named an advisor at Caja Madrid, and was sentenced to one year in prison in 2017 for his involvement in a credit card scandal.

== Early life and career ==
Espinar was born in Úbeda, Andalusia in 1954. He moved to Leganés in the Community of Madrid at the age of 20 in 1975; the commuter town experienced a lot of inwards migration from Andalusia, Extremadura and Castilla–La Mancha at the time. In 1978, he was told by the Spanish Socialist Workers' Party (PSOE) that he would be the candidate for mayor in the first democratic elections the following year. He was elected as the youngest mayor in the country, holding 14 seats in the city council, ten more than the second-placed Union of the Democratic Centre (UCD).

As mayor, Espinar set aside space for a university, which was eventually filled by a campus of the Charles III University of Madrid, and built a hospital. After extending his absolute majority in 1983, he was elected to the new Assembly of Madrid in the same year, becoming its first president. In 1987 he was named the region's minister for culture, and four years later its minister of finance, in the governments of President of the Community of Madrid, Joaquín Leguina.

Espinar left politics in 1995, being named by the PSOE as an advisor to the Caja Madrid savings bank In February 2017, the Audiencia Nacional sentenced him to a year in prison for his part in the "black cards" scandal, in which he used company credit cards to spend €178,400 on personal spending from 1995 to 2010.

== Personal life and death ==
Espinar's son, Ramón Espinar Merino (born 1986), served in the Assembly of Madrid and as a Senator for Podemos from 2015 to 2019.

Espinar died on 3 September 2026, at the age of 72, from a degenerative illness.
