= Juan Van-Halen Acedo =

Spanish writer, politician and journalist

Juan Van-Halen

President of the Assembly of Madrid
- In office 22 June 1995 – 20 April 1999
- Preceded by: Pedro Díez Olazábal
- Succeeded by: Jesús Pedroche

Personal details
- Born: 17 June 1944 (age 82) Torrelodones
- Citizenship: Spanish
- Party: People's Party
- Occupation: Politician · journalist · poet · historian

Juan Van-Halen Acedo (born 1944) is a Spanish poet, journalist, historian and politician member of the People's Party (PP). His political activity is notable in the scope of the Community of Madrid, where he chaired the presidency of the regional parliament between 1995 and 1999.

== Biography ==
Born on 17 June 1944 in Torrelodones. A poet coming from the intellectual falangist ranks of the Sindicato Español Universitario (SEU), he served as chief of the Cultural Activities Section of the National Delegation for Youth between 1968 and 1970. (Note: He is known in political circles as "Juanito Falange".)

He started a career in journalism in Ya. He later collaborated in Arriba and El Alcázar. He worked as correspondent in Vietnam.

He was elected member of the 2nd Assembly of Madrid within the list of People's Alliance (AP). Subsequently re-elected in the 1991, 1995, 1999, May 2003, October 2003, 2007, 2011 and 2015 regional elections representing the People's Party (PP), he served as president of the regional legislature in its 4th term (1995–1999).

He was also senator, designated by the Assembly of Madrid, between 1989 and 1995 and between 1999 and 2011.

He is a member both of the Real Academia de la Historia and the Real Academia de Bellas Artes de San Fernando.

== Bibliography ==
- Verdú Schumann, Daniel A. (2015). "La Sala Amadís (1961–1975): arte y/o franquismo" [The Amadis Chamber (1961-1975): art and / or Francoism]. Espacio, Tiempo y Forma. Serie VII, Historia del Arte (3). Madrid: Universidad Nacional de Educación a Distancia: 223–244. doi:10.5944/etfvii.3.2015.13046. hdl:10016/35108. ISSN 1130-4715. Archived from the original on 2018-10-16.
