= Marta Rivera de la Cruz =

Spanish writer

Marta Rivera de la Cruz MP
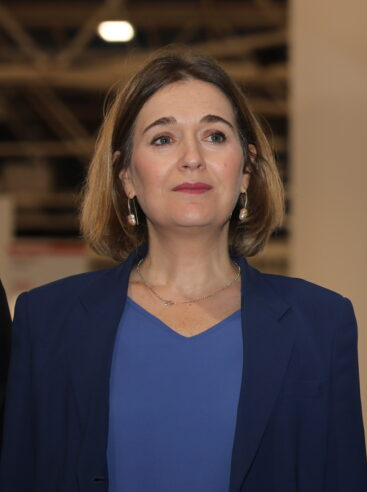

Regional Minister of Culture and Tourism
- In office 20 August 2019 – 10 March 2021
- President: Isabel Díaz Ayuso
- Preceded by: Jaime de los Santos
- Succeeded by: Enrique Ossorio (acting)

Regional Minister of Culture, Tourism and Sports
- In office 21 June 2021 – 22 June 2023
- President: Isabel Díaz Ayuso
- Preceded by: Enrique Ossorio (acting)
- Succeeded by: Mariano de Paco Serrano

Personal details
- Born: 16 September 1970 Lugo, Galicia, Spain
- Occupation: Novelist
- Website: www.martariveradelacruz.com

Marta Rivera de la Cruz (1970, Lugo, Spain) is a Spanish writer and politician from the Peoples Party. She was elected to the 15th Congress of Deputies in the 2023 Spanish general election from Madrid.

== Biography ==
Rivera de la Cruz was born into a family of well-known journalists. At the age of 18 she moved to Madrid, where she earned a bachelor of science degree in information with a specialty in political communication from the Universidad Complutense de Madrid. She spent a quarter studying at Oxford University on a scholarship. She continues to live in Madrid. She wrote her doctoral thesis in the Department of Philology at the Universidad Complutense and is a member of the editorial team of the on-line magazine of the Department, Espéculo.

She began her literary career in 1996 with the novel El refugio (The Refuge), for which she received the Premio de Novela Corta Joven y Brillante (1996). Two years later, in 1998, she won the Premio Ateneo of Seville for the novel Que veinte años no es nada (Twenty Years is Nothing), in which she relates the unchanging passion that Luisa feels for a famous writer, Cósimo Herrera, twenty years her elder. The novel went through five editions. In 2000 Rivera de la Cruz published two novels, Linus Daff, inventor de historias (Linus Daff, Inventor of Stories) and Viajar a Chipre (Traveling to Cyprus).

Besides her novels, Rivera de la Cruz has also written essays. In 2001 she published a book of essays entitled Fiestas que hicieron historia (Fiestas That Made History). She has also written short stories, such as "El beso del andén" (The Kiss of the Platform).

Hotel Almirante (Admiral Hotel), a novel, appeared in 2002. The story centers around the discovery of the body of a beautiful young woman in a luxury hotel. The following year, 2003, she published Tristezas de amor (Sadnesses of Love), another book of essays, and Grandes de España (Great People of Spain).

Her most recent novel, En tiempo de prodigios (In the Time of Wonders), was the runner-up for the Premio Planeta in 2006. The novel tells the story of Cecilia, a woman on whom life does not smile during the time period of the book, but who discovers the true meaning of life thanks to a story that Silvio, the grandfather of her best friend, tells her bit by bit. Even his family is not aware of his command of the German language and his past as a spy in World War II.

In addition to her writing, Rivera de la Cruz has worked as an editor. She was responsible for the anthology Cuentos de Navidad and for the latest edition of the work of Alejo Carpentier, La ciudad de las columnas (The City of Columns). She has worked in other media, such as El País Semanal (The County This Week), the Sunday supplement of the Madrid newspaper El País, and the radio program Al sur de la semana of the COPE radio chain. She works with various literary publications of Spain and North America, contributing articles on Hispano-American literature and other topics. She has also edited the Galician literature section of the literary magazine Leer.

== Works ==
=== Novels ===
- El Refugio (1996). Winner of the II Premio Novela Corta Joven y Brillante 1996.
- La segunda vida de Antonio Bénitez Reino (Lugo, 1997).
- Que veinte años no es nada (Seville, 1998). Winner of the II Premio Ateneo Joven de Sevilla de Novela 1998. ISBN 84-7647-804-6
- Linus Daff, inventor de historias (Barcelona, 2000). ISBN 84-01-32815-2
- Viajar a Chipre (Barcelona, 2000). ISBN 84-8450-158-2
- Hotel Almirante (Madrid, 2002). ISBN 84-670-0058-9
- En tiempo de prodigios (Madrid, 2006). Runner-up for the Premio Planeta 2006. ISBN 978-84-08-06901-0
- La vida despues (Barcelona 2011). ISBN ??
- La boda de Kate
- Nosotros, los de entonces

=== Essays ===
- Fiestas que hicieron historia (Madrid, 2001). ISBN 978-84-8460-139-5
- Tristezas de amor (Madrid, 2003). ISBN 84-670-0467-3

=== Biographies ===
- Grandes de España (Madrid, 2004). ISBN 978-84-03-09499-4

=== Other works ===
- "El beso del andén" (Madrid, 2001), a story in the anthology Sobre raíles. ISBN 84-95882-36-1
