= Ramón Espinar Merino =

Spanish politician

Ramón Espinar
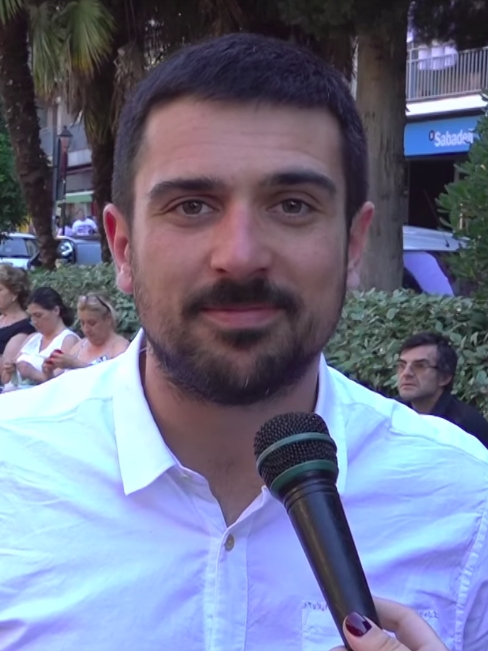

Member of the Assembly of Madrid
- In office 9 June 2015 – 25 January 2019

Senator
- In office 16 July 2015 – 25 January 2019

Personal details
- Born: 30 March 1986 (age 40) Madrid, Spain
- Party: Podemos

Ramón Espinar Merino (born 1986) is a Spanish politician. A member of the Assembly of Madrid from 2015 to 2019, he led the Podemos party branch in the Community of Madrid between 2016 and 2019.

== Biography ==
Early life

Born on 28 March 1986 in Madrid, Espinar is son of Ramón Espinar Gallego, Spanish Socialist Worker's Party politician who served as 1st President of the Assembly of Madrid between 1983 and 1987. He studied at the Instituto Ramiro de Maeztu. Graduated in Political Science at the Complutense University of Madrid (UCM) where he also studied a master in Political Analysis, Espinar took part in political organizations such as Juventud Sin Futuro and Contrapoder. He collaborated in LaTuerka (a TV show presented by Pablo Iglesias Turrión) and worked as researcher for the UCM.

Podemos

He ran 3rd in the Podemos list for the 2015 Madrilenian regional election, and became a member of the 10th term of the Assembly of Madrid. He also became a Senator, designated by the regional legislature.

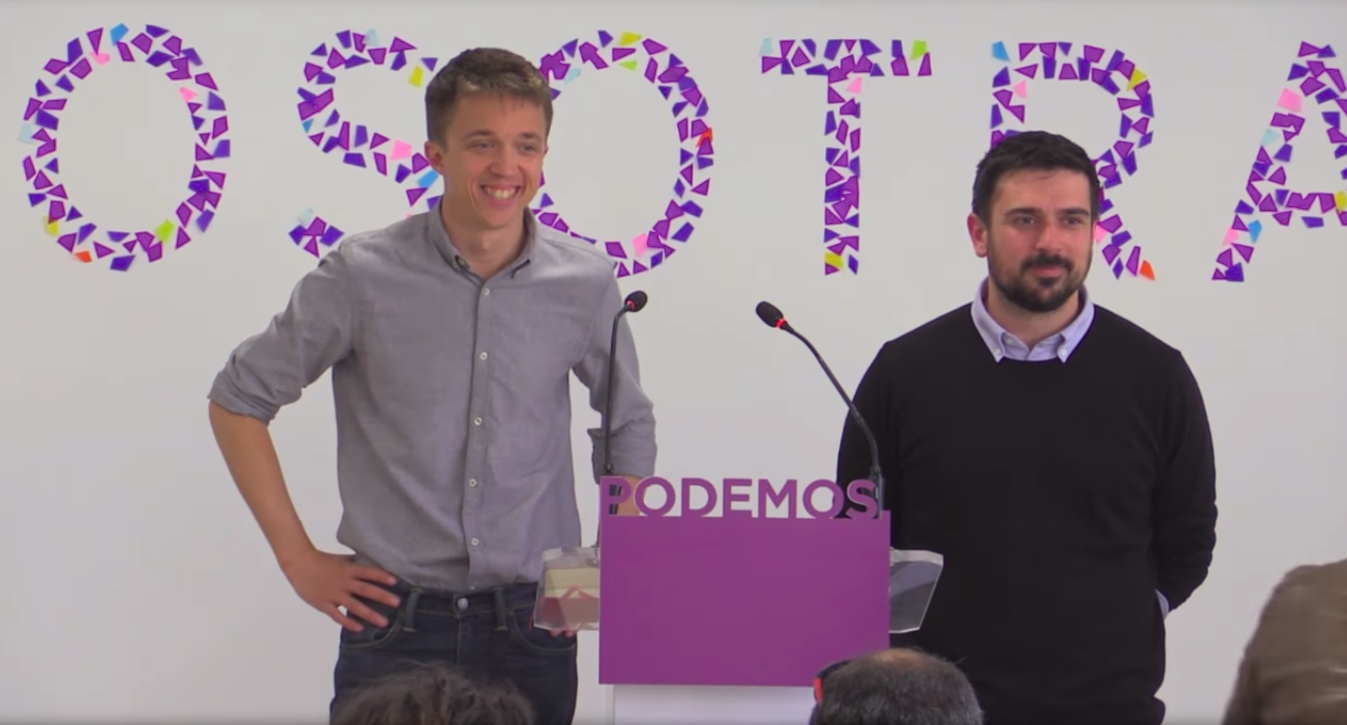
Next to Íñigo Errejón in April 2018

In November 2016 he participated in the party primary election to select their leader in the Community of Madrid. Espinar, considered a member of the 'pablista' faction, came out as the winner over the candidacy of Rita Maestre, considered an 'errejonista', and became the Secretary-General.

After a party crisis in January 2019, following the announcement of Íñigo Errejón vowing to run as candidate for the 2019 Madrilenian regional election within the Más Madrid platform, Espinar renounced to his parliamentary seat at the regional legislature (and therefore also to his seat as senator) as well as handed in his resignation as leader of Podemos in the Community of Madrid and the rest of his roles at the party, arguing the conditions to carry the Podemos project in Madrid towards where he thought it should be driven towards were not there.

Party political offices
Preceded by Luis Alegre Zahonero	Secretary-General of Podemos Community of Madrid; November 2016 – January 2019	Succeeded by
