= Seat of the Assembly of Madrid =

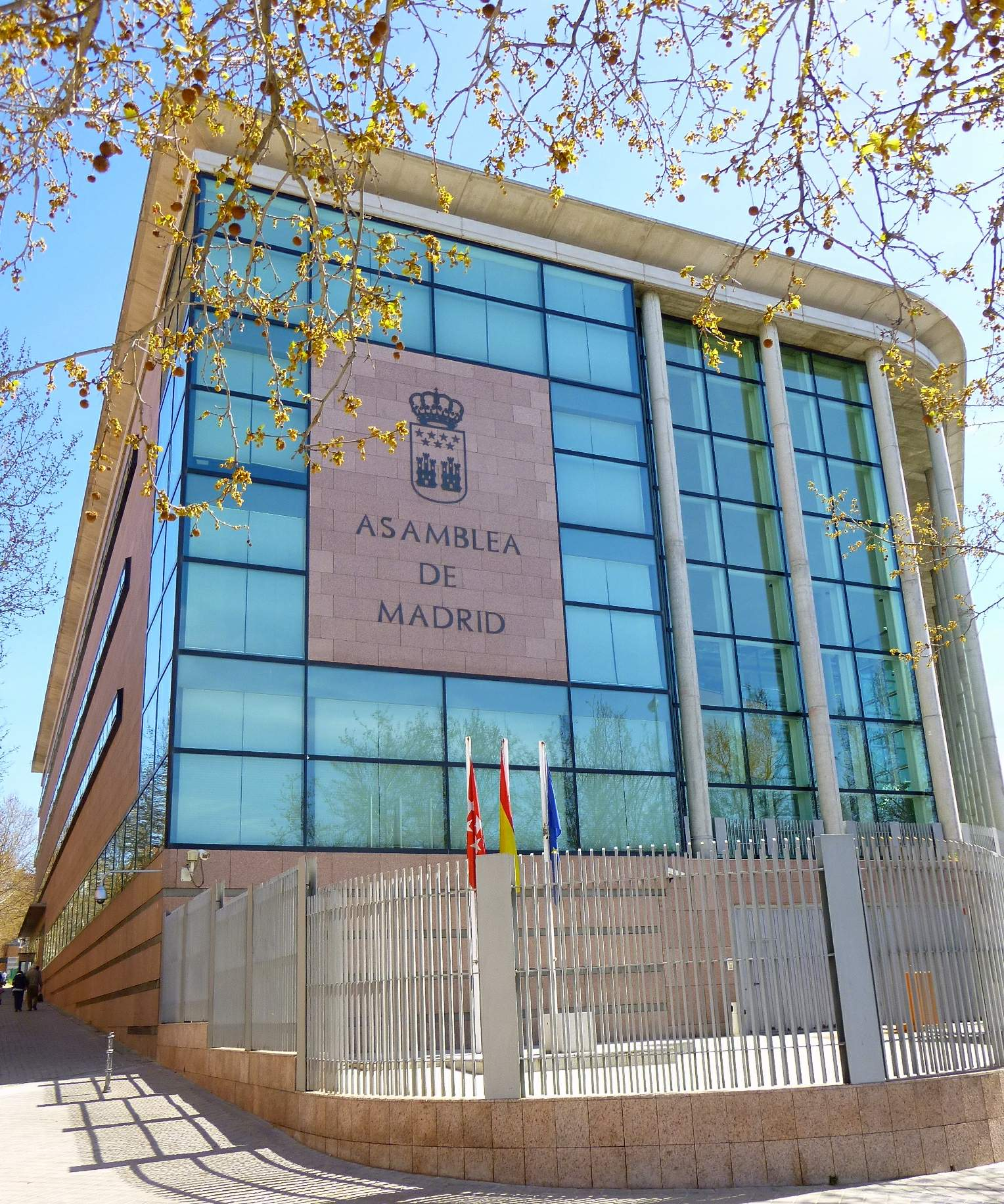

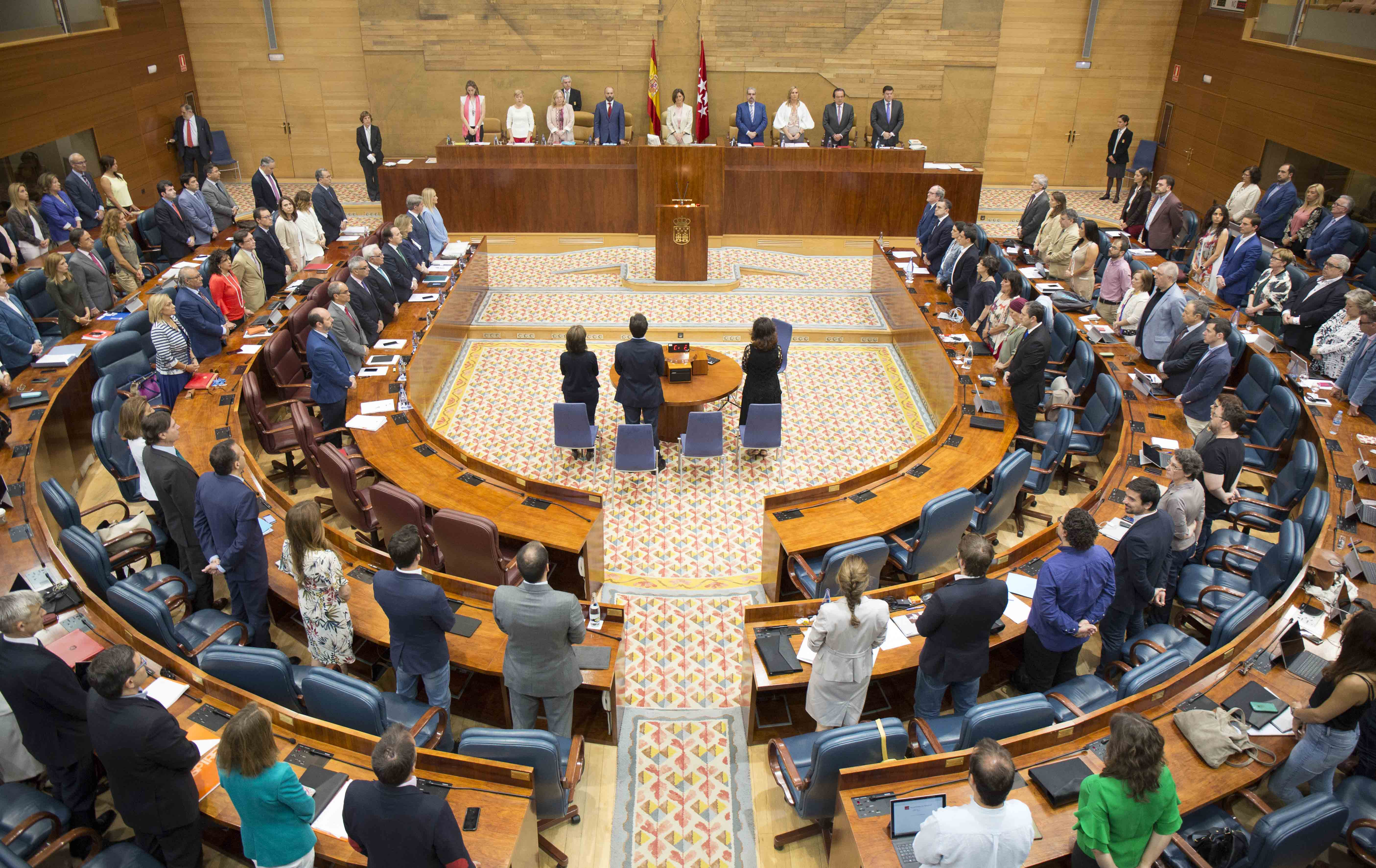

The Seat of the Assembly of Madrid (Spanish: Sede de la Asamblea de Madrid) is located in the neighbourhood of Palomeras Bajas in the Puente de Vallecas district of Madrid.

The Assembly of Madrid had been held in the city centre at the Caserón de San Bernardo. When a plan to move to Retiro was vetoed by the city council due to residents' complaints, Assembly president Pedro Díez proposed moving to the new site, and construction started in April 1995. The site opened in September 1998, at a cost of 3 billion Spanish pesetas.

The design of the main chamber as a glass cube within a triangular building was carried over from the plan for Retiro, although scaled down due to the smaller new site. The building houses a painting by Antonio López García and a mural that was the last work by Lucio Muñoz.

== Background and description ==
The Assembly of Madrid was previously seated in the Caserón de San Bernardo, a former Jesuit building in the centre of the capital city. A planned new building in Retiro did not receive approval by the city council, due to residents' complaints. Pedro Díez, the president of the Assembly (United Left; IU), campaigned for the legislature to instead be built in the city's disadvantaged south. The People's Party (PP) and Spanish Socialist Workers' Party (PSOE) supported this proposal, which passed unanimously.

The design by Juan Blasco and Ramón Valls-Navascués – with the main chamber as a glass cube within a triangular building – was carried over from the Retiro plan. Certain rooms were made smaller due to the smaller site, as was the car park, though the area was higher than at the previous legislative building. Construction was slated to begin in late 1994, with a 2 billion Spanish peseta budget. The final cost of the project came to 3 billion.

The building hosts the unfinished mural La ciudad inacabada (The Unfinished City) by Lucio Muñoz, who died weeks before it opened. There is also a gallery of portraits of presidents of the Assembly, the lectern from the old seat at San Bernardo, and the painting Madrid desde Vallecas (Madrid as seen from Vallecas) by Antonio López García.

== Construction and opening ==
The laying of the first stone in April 1995 was met by a protest from 200 residents who wanted public housing to be constructed instead. The protest was calmed by intervention from Juan Barranco Gallardo, a neighbourhood local and Socialist former mayor.

The building was inaugurated on 28 September 1998 by the Prince of Asturias (later Felipe VI of Spain), attended by regional president Alberto Ruiz-Gallardón and Assembly president Juan Van-Halen Acedo. Parts of the inauguration were boycotted by the IU who believed that it was giving undue attention to the incumbent PP regional government rather than the party who pushed for the move to the new site.

The building was closed from June to September 2017 for updating of its electronic voting system.
