= Enrique Ossorio =

Spanish politician

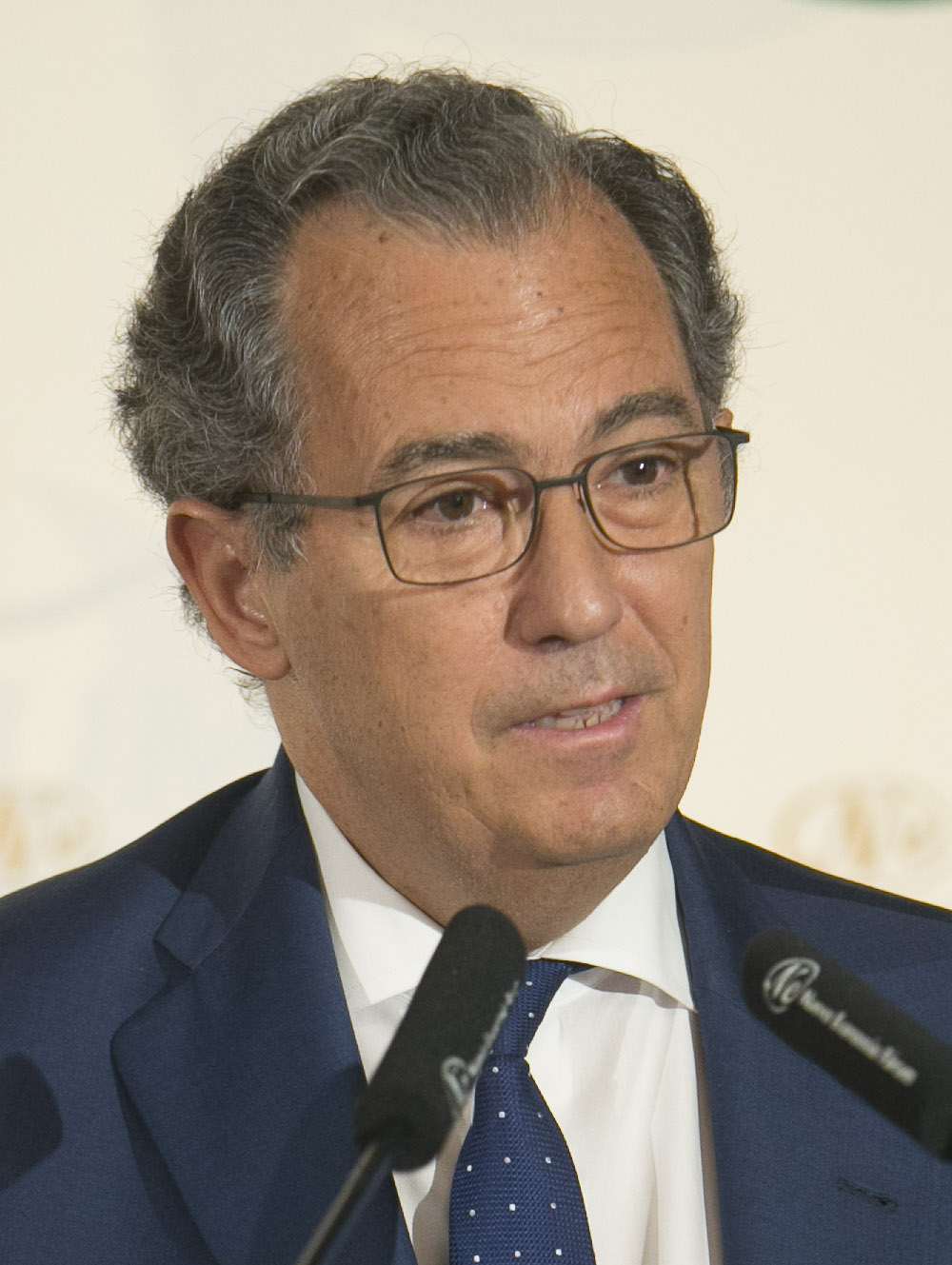

12th President of the Assembly of Madrid
- Incumbent
- Assumed office 13 June 2023
- Monarch: Felipe VI
- President: Isabel Díaz Ayuso
- Preceded by: Eugenia Carballedo

Vice President of the Community of Madrid
- In office 20 June 2022 – 13 June 2023
- President: Isabel Díaz Ayuso
- Preceded by: Ignacio Aguado
- Succeeded by: office vacant

Councillor of Education and Universities of the Community of Madrid
- In office 21 June 2021 – 13 June 2023
- Monarch: Felipe VI
- President: Isabel Díaz Ayuso
- Preceded by: Eduardo Sicilia (Science, Universities and Innovation); Himself (Education and Youth)

Councillor of Culture and Tourism of the Community of Madrid (acting)
- In office 11 March 2021 – 13 June 2023
- President: Isabel Díaz Ayuso
- Preceded by: Marta Rivera de la Cruz
- Succeeded by: Marta Rivera de la Cruz (Culture, Tourism and Sports)

Councillor of Education and Youth of the Community of Madrid
- In office 20 August 2019 – 21 June 2021
- President: Isabel Díaz Ayuso
- Preceded by: Rafael van Grieken (Education and Research)
- Succeeded by: Himself (Education and Universities)

Councillor of Economy and Finance of the Community of Madrid
- In office 28 September 2012 – 27 June 2015
- President: Ignacio González
- Preceded by: Percival Manglano
- Succeeded by: Engracia Hidalgo (Economy, Employment and Finance)

Personal details
- Born: Enrique Matías Ossorio Crespo; 27 June 1959 (age 67) Badajoz, Spain
- Party: PP
- Education: Complutense University of Madrid

Enrique Matías Ossorio Crespo (born 27 June 1959) is a Spanish politician from the People's Party of the Community of Madrid (PP), serving as the President of the Assembly of Madrid since 13 June 2023. He previously served as Cabinet Minister of Education and Youth of the Community of Madrid from August 2019, and previously as Cabinet Minister of Economy and Finance between September 2012 and June 2015. He is also serving as acting Spokesperson of the Government, Cabinet Minister of Science, Universities and Innovation and of Culture and Tourism since March 2021.
