= Metrobús (ticket) =

Tarjeta de transporte público de la Comunidad de Madrid

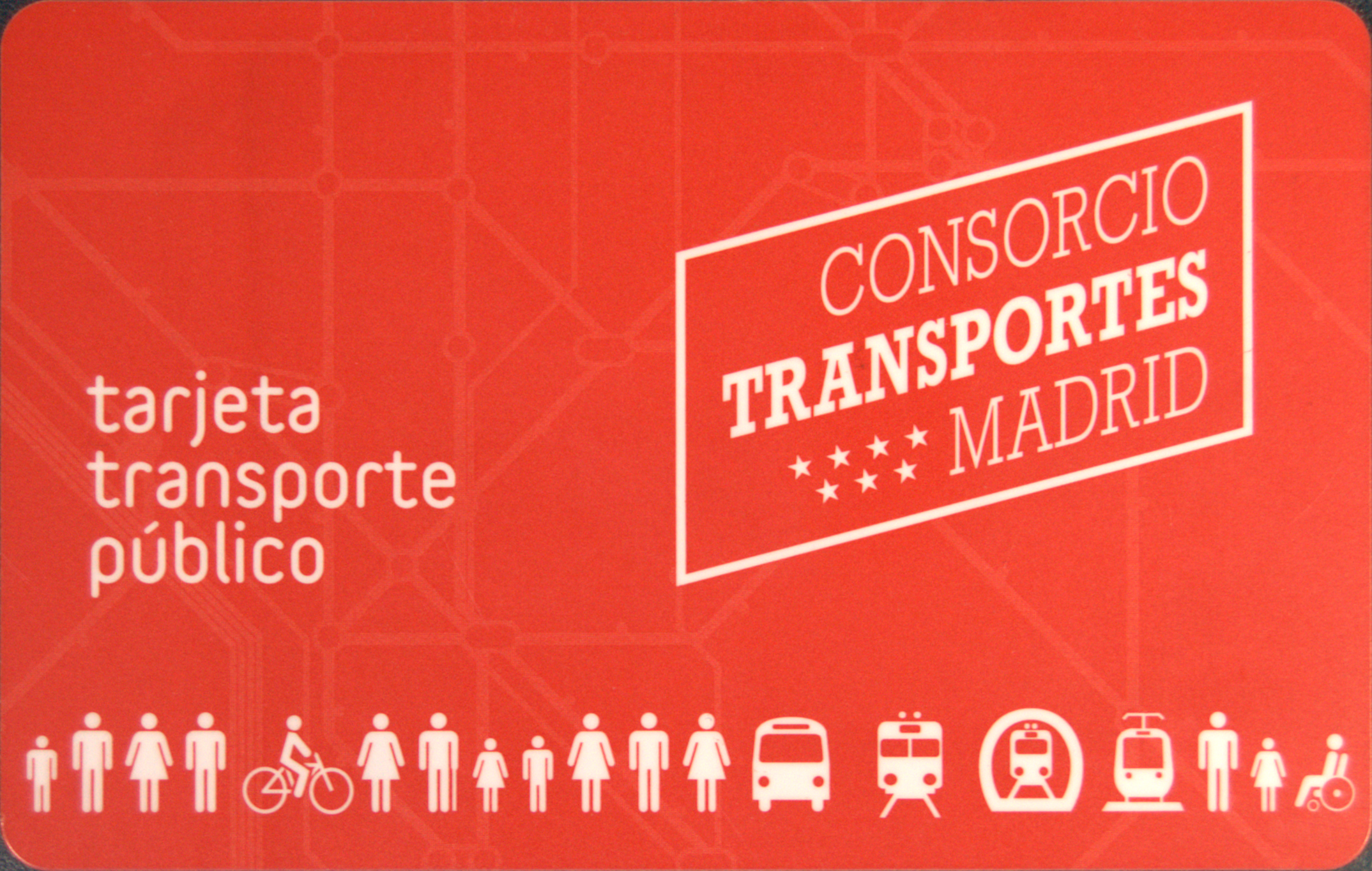
obverse.

In Madrid, Metrobús is the name given to the ticket that allows to travel 10 times inside of the bus and Metro system of the city.

== Fares ==
Metrobús fares over the years
Year	Price
1997	660 pesetas (€3.97)
1998	670 pesetas (€4.03)
1999	680 pesetas (€4.09)
2000	680 pesetas (€4.09)
2001	760 pesetas (€4,57)
2002	€5
2003	€5.20
2004	€5.35
2005	€5.80
2006	€6.15
2007	€6.40
2008	€6.70
2008 (August)	€7
2009	€7.40
2010	€9
2011	€9.30
2012	€12
2012 (September)	€12.20
2013	€12.20
2014	€12.20
2015	€12.20
2016	€12.20
2017	€12.20
