= María del Carmen Álvarez-Arenas Cisneros =

Spanish politician (born 1948)

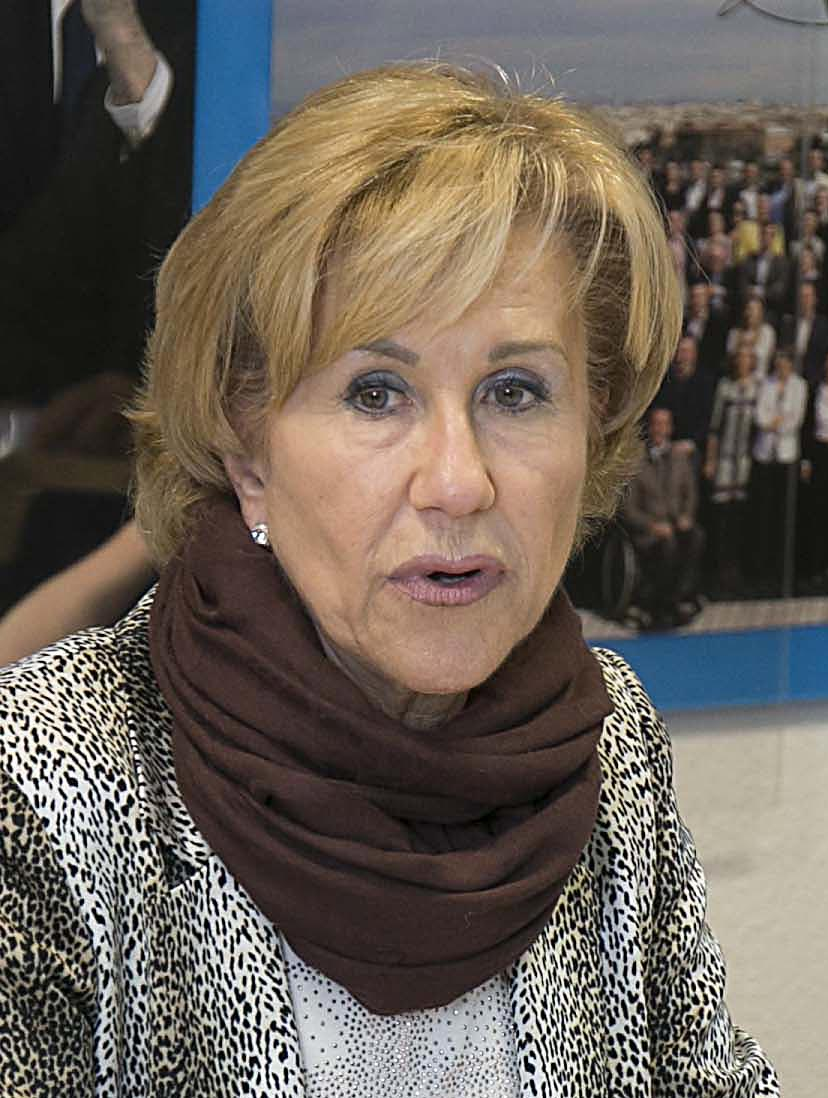

Member of the Spanish Parliament
- In office March 24, 2008 – September 18, 2017

Personal details
- Born: August 3, 1948 (age 77) Madrid, Spain
- Party: PP
- Education: King Juan Carlos University
- Occupation: Politician

María del Carmen Álvarez-Arenas Cisneros (August 3, 1948, Madrid, Spain) is a Spanish politician, member of the Popular Party (PP) in Congress during the IX, X, XI and XII Legislatures.

== Biography ==
Daughter of Félix Álvarez-Arenas Pacheco, Minister of the Army. With a degree in Business administration, she also holds a master's degree in Business management and Administration from the Instituto de Empresa and another in Security and Defense from the Universidad Rey Juan Carlos. At the political level, she is a member of the Regional Executive Board of the PP of Madrid. She was a member of the Assembly of Madrid between 1987 and 2008, vice-counselor of the Presidency of the Community of Madrid between 1995 and 1999, senator for the Community of Madrid between 1999 and 2003 and vice-counselor of Employment and Women of the Community of Madrid between 2005 and 2008. In 2008 she was elected to the Congress of Deputies for Madrid, being reelected in 2011, 2015 and 2016.

In September 2017, she resigned as a member of parliament and resigned her seat due to the scandal generated when it was revealed that she had concealed her business dealings abroad from Congress. Previously, during her time in the government of the Community of Madrid, it was revealed that she participated in the drafting of laws that benefited her own companies.
