= Rosa Posada =

Spanish lawyer and politician

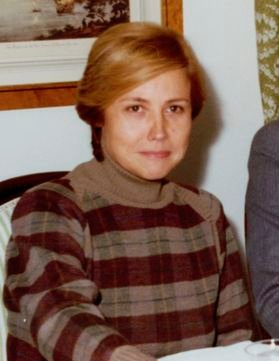
Rosa Posada in 1980

Rosa María Posada Chapado (Madrid, 17 January 1940 — Madrid, 29 October 2014) was a Spanish lawyer and politician. She served as President of the Assembly of Madrid (1987-1991) as well as Vice President.
