= Assembly of Madrid =

Regional parliament in Spain

Coordinates: 40°22′55.15″N 3°39′44.29″W

Assembly of Madrid Asamblea de Madrid

Type
- Type: Spanish regional legislature
- Houses: Unicameral

Leadership
- President: Enrique Ossorio, PP since 14 June 2023
- Vice President: Ana Belén Millán, PP since 14 June 2023
- Second Vice President: Esther Rodríguez, Más Madrid since 14 June 2023
- Third Vice President: Diego Cruz, PSOE-M since 14 June 2023
- Secretary: Francisco Galeote, PP since 14 June 2023
- Second Secretary: José Ignacio Arias, Vox since 14 June 2023
- Third Secretary: Susana Pérez, PP since 14 June 2023

Structure
- Seats: 135
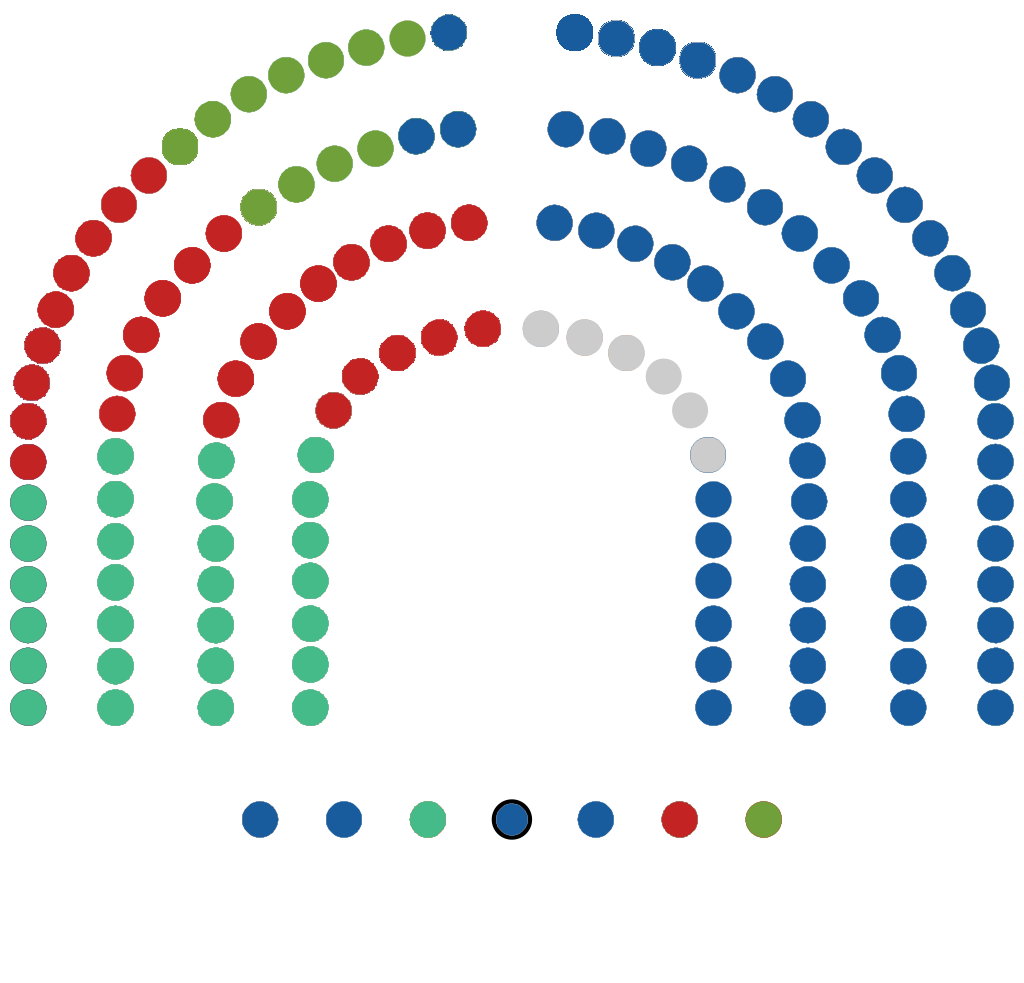
- Political groups: Government (70): PP (70); Opposition (65): Más Madrid (27); PSOE-M (27); Vox (11)

Elections
- Last election: 28 May 2023
- Next election: Next

Meeting place
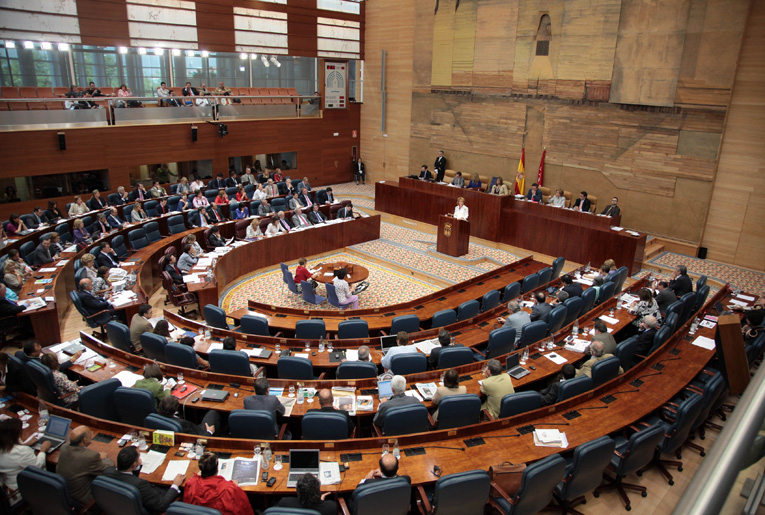
- Seat of the Assembly of Madrid; Plaza de la Asamblea, Madrid, Community of Madrid

Website
- www.asambleamadrid.es

The Assembly of Madrid or Madrid Assembly (Spanish: Asamblea de Madrid) is the unicameral autonomous legislature of the Autonomous Community of Madrid since the approval of the Madrid Charter of Autonomy in 1983.

It is elected every four years during the Spanish Regional and Municipal elections, as the Community of Madrid Charter of Autonomy does not recognise the right to call early elections (as in the Basque Country, Catalonia, Galicia and Andalusia), save for exceptional situations like the scandal that deadlocked the May 2003 Assembly and forced fresh elections in October 2003. According to the Charter, the Assembly is empowered to write Madrid's regional legislation, to control the regional government's actions, and to elect the President of the Community of Madrid.

The Assembly meets in the district of Vallecas of Madrid in a hall inaugurated in 1998 specifically designed to host the Madrid Assembly.

== Membership ==
The legislature is currently (as of 2021) made up of 136 deputies, elected all at once in closed party lists for terms of 4 years. Seats are allocated using the proportional D'Hondt method in one constituency, which makes the Madrid Assembly one of the biggest parliaments in the world with one only constituency. In 2007, this fact moved President Esperanza Aguirre to propose splitting the Community of Madrid into twelve constituencies of 9 to 15 AMs each. The alleged benefit was increasing the contact between statesmen and their electors, but the reform was rejected by the rest of parties in the Assembly on the grounds that it was not a pressing matter, and it would alter the composition of the assembly in favour of the most voted party. Eventually, the proposal was abandoned even though President Aguirre had the majority to pass it through the Assembly, because it would be defeated in the Cortes Generales as it had to be done through a process of reform of the Charter of Autonomy.

Parties that obtain more than 5AMs can form a parliamentary group, in order to organise and participate in the debates and committees of the assembly. Parties that do not reach that number of seats will be part of the mixed group. Currently the threshold for obtaining seats in the Madrid Assembly is 5% of the total votes cast including votes "en blanco" i.e. for "none of the above", thus making it mathematically impossible for a party to obtain less than five seats.

=== Results of the elections to the Assembly of Madrid ===
Deputies in Assembly of Madrid since 1983
Key to parties Podemos–IU PCE IU MM PSOE UPyD UCD Cs CDS CD PP CP AP Vox
Election	Distribution	President
1983	9 / 51 / 34	Joaquín Leguina (PSOE)
1987	7 / 40 / 17 / 32	Joaquín Leguina (PSOE)
1991	13 / 41 / 47	Joaquín Leguina (PSOE)
1995	17 / 32 / 54	Alberto Ruiz-Gallardón (PP)
1999	8 / 39 / 55	Alberto Ruiz-Gallardón (PP)
May 2003	9 / 47 / 55	Alberto Ruiz-Gallardón (PP)
Oct 2003	9 / 45 / 57	Esperanza Aguirre (PP) (2003–2012) Ignacio González (PP) (2012–2015)
2007	11 / 42 / 67	Esperanza Aguirre (PP) (2003–2012) Ignacio González (PP) (2012–2015)
2011	13 / 36 / 8 / 72	Esperanza Aguirre (PP) (2003–2012) Ignacio González (PP) (2012–2015)
2015	27 / 37 / 17 / 48	Cristina Cifuentes (PP) (2015–2018) Ángel Garrido (PP) (2018–2019)
2019	7 / 20 / 37 / 26 / 30 / 12	Isabel Díaz Ayuso (PP)
2021	10 / 24 / 24 / 65 / 13	Isabel Díaz Ayuso (PP)
2023	27 / 27 / 70 / 11	Isabel Díaz Ayuso (PP)

== Leadership ==
The Madrid Assembly's Leadership resides in the Bureau of the Assembly comprising a President (Speaker), three Vice Presidents who chair debate when the President is absent, and three Secretaries, elected in the first session of each newly elected Assembly. The Bureau is tasked with managing the Assembly schedule and interpreting its rules of order, including the power to expel members from the sessions.

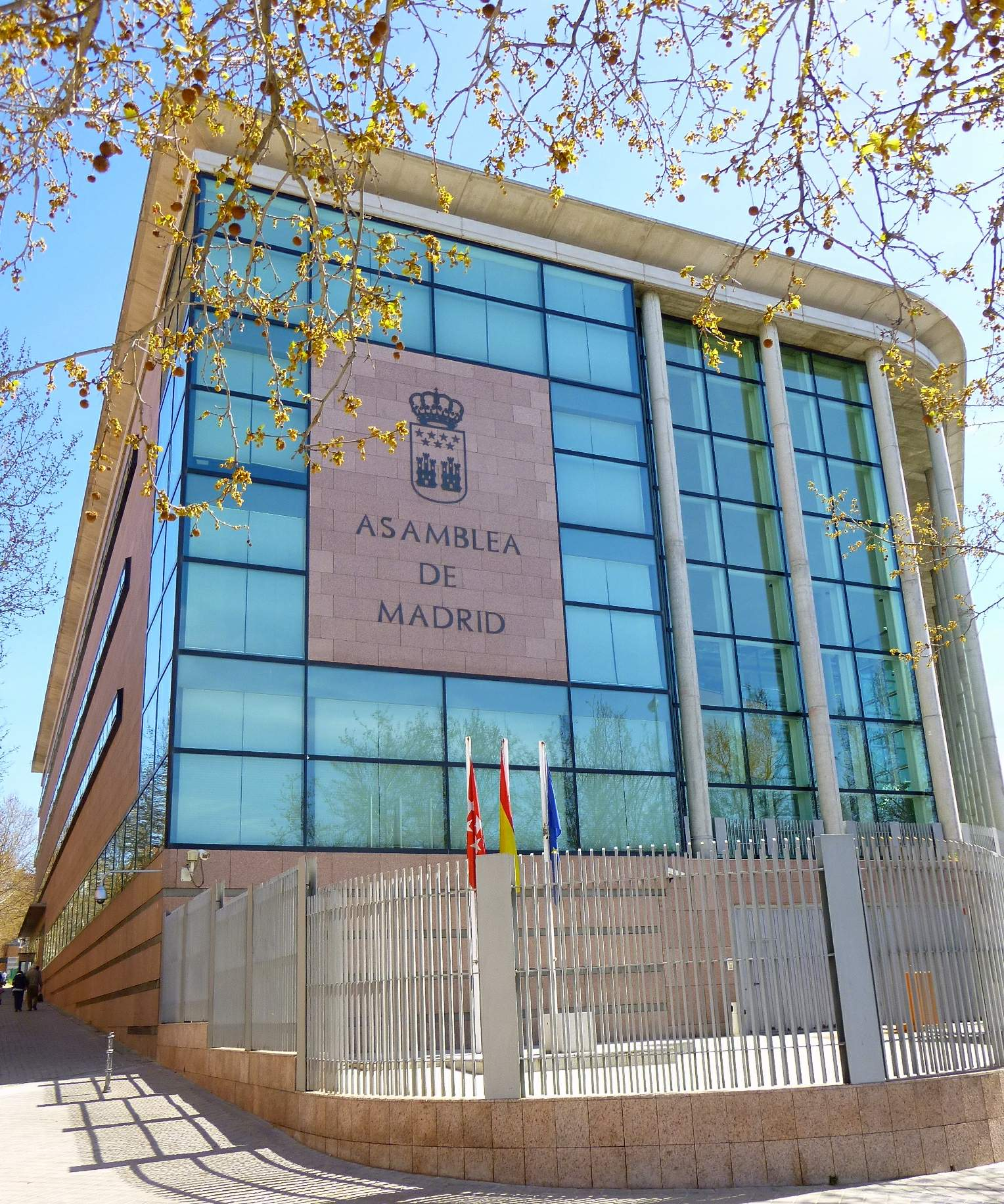
The seat of the Assembly of Madrid

Composition of the Bureau of the Madrid Assembly for the 12th Assembly of Madrid
Position	Name	Party
President (Speaker)	María Eugenia Carballedo Berlanga	PPCM
1st Vice President	Jorge Rodrigo Domínguez	PPCM
2nd Vice President	Ignacio Arias Moreno	Vox
3rd Vice President	Esther Rodríguez Moreno	Más Madrid
1st Secretary	José María Arribas del Barrio	PPCM
2nd Secretary	Diego Cruz Torrijos	PSOE-M
3rd Secretary	Francisco Galeote Perea	PPCM

There is also a second, consultative body, the Spokespersons' Council (Spanish: Junta de Portavoces), which is made up of the leaders and spokespersons from each parliamentary group in the Assembly and has the right to be "heard" before the Bureau takes some decisions such as scheduling debates and votes. In the Spanish system, however, ruling parties usually do not hold a tight grip over the Parliament's schedule, nor do they use it to turn down the opposition proposals without debate: they are just voted down in committee or by the full house after the shortest debate allowed by the rules of order. Thus, while control of the Bureau and the Spokespersons' Council is definitely important, it is not a critical matter as it sometimes becomes in other systems.

== Committees ==
The Assembly organises its work in different committees. Committees are constituted by the bureau of the Assembly on the advice of the Spokespersons' Council. The number and grouping of its members is also determined at the same time. The election of the membership of the committees is a role of the parliamentary groups that have to be always represented in the committees. The committees are directed by a Bureau composed of a chair, a vice-chair and a secretary and each group is to designate a Spokesperson and an adjutant spokesperson for the committee, that will usually take care of that matters also in the plenary.

== See also ==
- List of presidents of the Assembly of Madrid
