= 1987 Madrilenian regional election =

Election in the Spanish region of Madrid

- 10 June 1987

All 96 seats in the Assembly of Madrid 49 seats needed for a majority
- Opinion polls
- Registered: 3,515,847 ▲4.0%
- Turnout: 2,456,467 (69.9%) ▲0.2 pp
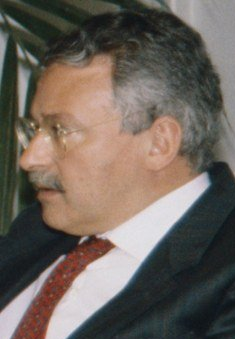

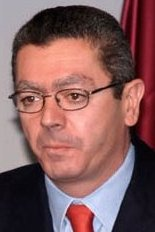

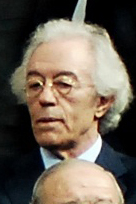

| | First party | Second party | Third party |
|---|---|---|---|
| Leader | Joaquín Leguina | Alberto Ruiz-Gallardón | Fernando Castedo |
| Party | PSOE | AP | CDS |
| Leader since | 14 December 1979 | 8 February 1987 | 1987 |
| Last election | 51 seats, 50.5% | 28 seats (CP) (Note: Within the AP–PDP–UL alliance in the 1983 election: AP (28 seats) and PDP (6 seats).) | 0 seats, 3.1% |
| Seats won | 40 | 32 | 17 |
| Seat change | ▼11 | ▲4 | ▲17 |
| Popular vote | 932,878 | 762,102 | 403,440 |
| Percentage | 38.4% | 31.4% | 16.6% |
| Swing | ▼12.1 pp | n/a | ▲13.5 pp |
| | Fourth party | Fifth party |
| Leader | Isabel Villalonga | José Antonio López Casas |
| Party | IU | PDP |
| Leader since | 1987 | 1987 |
| Last election | 9 seats, 8.8% (Note: Results for PCE in the 1983 election.) | 6 seats (CP) |
| Seats won | 7 | 0 |
| Seat change | ▼2 | ▼6 |
| Popular vote | 181,512 | 9,101 |
| Percentage | 7.5% | 0.4% |
| Swing | ▼1.3 pp | n/a |
President before election
Joaquín Leguina
PSOE
President after election
Joaquín Leguina
PSOE

A regional election was held in the Community of Madrid on 10 June 1987 to elect the 2nd Assembly of the autonomous community. All 96 seats in the Assembly were up for election. It was held concurrently with regional elections in twelve other autonomous communities and local elections all across Spain, as well as the 1987 European Parliament election.

The Spanish Socialist Workers' Party (PSOE) under Joaquín Leguina lost its overall majority in the Assembly, but remained the largest party. The most notable election result was the Democratic and Social Centre (CDS) breakthrough, emerging as the third largest party at the expense of all other parties in the regional parliament. The People's Alliance (AP) of newly elected AP Madrid leader Alberto Ruiz-Gallardón remained static, maintaining its position as the second largest party, while United Left (IU), a coalition of the Communist Party of Spain and other left-wing political forces, slipped to fourth place.

In the aftermath of the election, the CDS chose to abstain in the investiture voting in order to allow the PSOE to continue to govern in minority.

== Overview ==
Under the 1983 Statute of Autonomy, the Assembly of Madrid was the unicameral legislature of the homonymous autonomous community, having legislative power in devolved matters, as well as the ability to grant or withdraw confidence from a regional president. The electoral and procedural rules were supplemented by national law provisions.

=== Date ===
The term of the Assembly of Madrid expired four years after the date of its previous ordinary election. The election decree was required to be issued no later than 25 days before the scheduled expiration date of parliament and published on the following day in the Official Gazette of the Community of Madrid (BOCM), with election day taking place between 54 and 60 days after the decree's publication (and in any case within from 30 to 60 days after the parliament's expiration). The previous election was held on 8 May 1983, which meant that the chamber's term would have expired on 8 May 1987. The election decree was required to be published in the BOCM no later than 14 April 1987, setting the latest possible date for election day on 13 June 1987.

The Assembly of Madrid could not be dissolved before the expiration date of parliament, except in the event of an investiture process failing to elect a regional president within a two-month period from the first ballot. In such a case, the Assembly was to be automatically dissolved and a snap election called, with elected lawmakers serving the remainder of its original four-year term.

The election to the Assembly of Madrid was officially called on 14 April 1987 with the publication of the corresponding decree in the BOCM, setting election day for 10 June and scheduling for the chamber to reconvene on 2 July.

=== Electoral system ===
Voting for the Assembly was based on universal suffrage, comprising all Spanish nationals over 18 years of age, registered in the Community of Madrid and with full political rights, provided that they had not been deprived of the right to vote by a final sentence, nor were legally incapacitated.

The Assembly of Madrid had one seat per 50,000 inhabitants or fraction above 25,000. All were elected in a single multi-member constituency—corresponding to the autonomous community's territory—using the D'Hondt method and closed-list proportional voting, with a five percent-threshold of valid votes (including blank ballots) regionally. As a result of the aforementioned allocation, the Assembly was entitled to 96 seats, based on the official population figures resulting from the latest revision of the municipal register (as of 1 January 1986).

The law did not provide for by-elections to fill vacant seats; instead, any vacancies arising after the proclamation of candidates and during the legislative term were filled by the next candidates on the party lists or, when required, by designated substitutes.

== Parties and candidates ==
The electoral law allowed for parties and federations registered in the interior ministry, alliances and groupings of electors to present lists of candidates. Parties and federations intending to form an alliance were required to inform the relevant electoral commission within 10 days of the election call, whereas groupings of electors needed to secure the signature of at least 0.5 percent of the electorate in the Community of Madrid, disallowing electors from signing for more than one list.

Below is a list of the main parties and alliances which contested the election:

| Candidacy | Parties and alliances | Candidate | Ideology | Previous result | | Gov. | Ref. |
| Candidacy | Parties and alliances | Candidate | Ideology | Vote % | Seats | Gov. | Ref. |
|---|---|---|---|---|---|---|---|
| PSOE | List: Spanish Socialist Workers' Party (PSOE) | Joaquín Leguina | Social democracy | 50.5% | 51 | Yes | |
| AP | List: People's Alliance (AP) | Alberto Ruiz-Gallardón | Conservatism; National conservatism | 34.1% | 34 | No | |
| PDP | List: People's Democratic Party (PDP) | José Antonio López Casas | Christian democracy | 34.1% | 34 | No | |
| IU | List: Communist Party of Madrid (PCM); Socialist Action Party (PASOC); Communist Party of the Peoples of Spain (PCPE); Progressive Federation (FP); Republican Left (IR) | Isabel Villalonga | Socialism; Communism | 8.8% | 9 | No | |
| CDS | List: Democratic and Social Centre (CDS) | Fernando Castedo | Centrism; Liberalism | 3.1% | 0 | No | |

== Opinion polls ==
The tables below list opinion polling results in reverse chronological order, showing the most recent first and using the dates when the survey fieldwork was done, as opposed to the date of publication. Where the fieldwork dates are unknown, the date of publication is given instead. The highest percentage figure in each polling survey is displayed with its background shaded in the leading party's colour. If a tie ensues, this is applied to the figures with the highest percentages. The "Lead" column on the right shows the percentage-point difference between the parties with the highest percentages in a poll.

=== Voting intention estimates ===
The table below lists weighted voting intention estimates. Refusals are generally excluded from the party vote percentages, while question wording and the treatment of "don't know" responses and those not intending to vote may vary between polling organisations. When available, seat projections determined by the polling organisations are displayed below (or in place of) the percentages in a smaller font; 49 seats were required for an absolute majority in the Assembly of Madrid (48 in the 1983 election).

| Polling firm/Commissioner | Fieldwork date | Sample size | Turnout | PSOE | AP–PDP–PL | IU | CDS | AP | PDP | PTE–UC | Lead |
|---|---|---|---|---|---|---|---|---|---|---|---|
| 1987 regional election | 10 Jun 1987 | —N/a | 69.9 | 38.4; 40 | – | 7.5; 7 | 16.6; 17 | 31.4; 32 | 0.4; 0 | 1.7; 0 | 7.0 |
| Gallup/Ya | 4 Jun 1987 | 3,583 | 72.7 | 37.2; 38 | – | 10.3; 10/11 | 14.6; 15 | 31.9; 32/33 | 0.5; 0 | 4.0; 0 | 5.3 |
| Demoscopia/El País | 22–26 May 1987 | ? | 70 | 34.4; 35 | – | 7.8; 7 | 25.0; 25 | 26.6; 27 | 1.6; 0 | – | 7.8 |
| Sofemasa/AP | 16 Apr 1987 | ? | ? | 36.3 | – | 7.2 | 18.0 | 23.0 | 1.0 | – | 13.3 |
| 1986 general election | 22 Jun 1986 | —N/a | 73.9 | 40.8 (43) | 32.0 (33) | 6.0 (6) | 13.9 (14) | (Note: Within CP.) | | 2.5 (0) | 8.8 |
| 1983 regional election | 8 May 1983 | —N/a | 69.7 | 50.5; 51 | 34.1; 34 | 8.8; 9 | 3.1; 0 | | | – | 16.4 |

== Results ==
=== Overall ===
← Summary of the 10 June 1987 Assembly of Madrid election results →
| Parties and alliances | Popular vote | | | Seats | |
| Parties and alliances | Votes | % | ±pp | Total | +/− |
|---|---|---|---|---|---|
| Spanish Socialist Workers' Party (PSOE) | 932,878 | 38.45 | −12.03 | 40 | −11 |
| People's Alliance (AP)^{1} | 762,102 | 31.41 | n/a | 32 | +4 |
| Democratic and Social Centre (CDS) | 403,440 | 16.63 | +13.51 | 17 | +17 |
| United Left (IU)^{2} | 181,512 | 7.48 | −1.37 | 7 | −2 |
| Workers' Party of Spain–Communist Unity (PTE–UC) | 41,323 | 1.70 | New | 0 | ±0 |
| The Greens (LV) | 26,187 | 1.08 | New | 0 | ±0 |
| Confederation of the Greens (CV) | 12,755 | 0.53 | New | 0 | ±0 |
| People's Democratic Party (PDP)^{1} | 9,101 | 0.38 | n/a | 0 | −6 |
| Humanist Platform (PH) | 4,963 | 0.20 | New | 0 | ±0 |
| Internationalist Socialist Workers' Party (POSI) | 3,574 | 0.15 | New | 0 | ±0 |
| Autonomic Independent Group of Madrid (AIAM) | 3,432 | 0.14 | New | 0 | ±0 |
| Communist Unification of Spain (UCE) | 3,009 | 0.12 | New | 0 | ±0 |
| Blank ballots | 42,196 | 1.74 | +1.15 | | |
| Total | 2,426,472 | | | 96 | +2 |
| Valid votes | 2,426,472 | 98.78 | −0.51 | | |
| Invalid votes | 29,995 | 1.22 | +0.51 | | |
| Votes cast / turnout | 2,456,467 | 69.87 | +0.17 | | |
| Abstentions | 1,059,380 | 30.13 | −0.17 | | |
| Registered voters | 3,515,847 | | | | |
Sources
Footnotes: ^{1} Within the People's Coalition alliance in the 1983 election.; ^{2} United Left results are compared to Communist Party of Spain totals in the 1983 election.

Popular vote
| PSOE | 38.45% |
| AP | 31.41% |
| CDS | 16.63% |
| IU | 7.48% |
| PTE–UC | 1.70% |
| LV | 1.08% |
| Others | 1.52% |
| Blank ballots | 1.74% |

Seats
| PSOE | 41.67% |
| AP | 33.33% |
| CDS | 17.71% |
| IU | 7.29% |

=== Elected legislators ===
The following table lists the elected legislators sorted by order of election.

Elected legislators
| # | Name | List |
|---|---|---|
| 1 | Joaquín Leguina Herrán | PSOE |
| 2 | Alberto Ruiz-Gallardón Jiménez | AP |
| 3 | Ramón Espinar Gallego | PSOE |
| 4 | Fernando Castedo Álvarez ^{(es)} | CDS |
| 5 | Luis Eduardo Cortés Muñoz ^{(es)} | AP |
| 6 | César Cimadevilla Costa ^{(es)} | PSOE |
| 7 | Pedro Núñez Morgades ^{(es)} | AP |
| 8 | Luis Alejandro Cendrero Costa | PSOE |
| 9 | Rosa María Posada Chaparro | CDS |
| 10 | Alfredo Navarro Velasco | AP |
| 11 | María Gómez Mendoza | PSOE |
| 12 | Isabel María Teresa Vilallonga Elviro | IU |
| 13 | Eduardo Mangada Samaín ^{(es)} | PSOE |
| 14 | Gabriel Usera González | AP |
| 15 | Gerardo Harguindey Banet ^{(es)} | CDS |
| 16 | Manuel de la Rocha Rubí | PSOE |
| 17 | José López López | AP |
| 18 | Virgilio Cano de Lope ^{(es)} | PSOE |
| 19 | Bonifacio Santiago Prieto | AP |
| 20 | María Elena Flores Valencia ^{(fr)} | PSOE |
| 21 | Laura Morsó Pérez | CDS |
| 22 | Ángel Larroca de Dolarea | AP |
| 23 | Agapito Ramos Cuenca ^{(es)} | PSOE |
| 24 | Pedro Díez Olazábal ^{(es)} | IU |
| 25 | Francisca Sauquillo Pérez del Arco | PSOE |
| 26 | Cándida O'Shea Suárez-Inclán | AP |
| 27 | Ildefonso Barajas Ayllón | CDS |
| 28 | Marcos Sanz Agüero ^{(es)} | PSOE |
| 29 | Roberto Sanz Pinacho | AP |
| 30 | Luis Maestre Muñiz | PSOE |
| 31 | Antonio Germán Beteta Barreda ^{(es)} | AP |
| 32 | Carlos A. Alonso de Velasco | CDS |
| 33 | Francisco Cabaco López | PSOE |
| 34 | Francisco Javier Rodríguez Rodríguez ^{(es)} | AP |
| 35 | José Luis García Alonso | PSOE |
| 36 | Manuel Juan Corvo González | IU |
| 37 | Ismael Bardisa Jordá ^{(es)} | AP |
| 38 | Francisco Javier Ledesma Bartret | PSOE |
| 39 | Fernando M. Lozano Bonilla | CDS |
| 40 | Jaime Lissavetzky Díez | PSOE |
| 41 | José Martín Crespo Díaz | AP |
| 42 | José Luis Fernández Rioja | PSOE |
| 43 | Eduardo Duque Fernández de Pinedo | AP |
| 44 | Manuel Justel Calabozo | CDS |
| 45 | Carmen Ferrero Torres ^{(es)} | PSOE |
| 46 | María del Carmen Álvarez-Arenas Cisneros | AP |
| 47 | Adolfo Martínez Sánchez | PSOE |
| 48 | José Antonio Moral Santín ^{(es)} | IU |
| 49 | José Luis Ortiz Estévez | AP |
| 50 | Javier de Luxán Meléndez | CDS |
| 51 | Elvira Domingo Ortiz | PSOE |
| 52 | Alfonso Sacristán Alonso ^{(d)} | PSOE |
| 53 | María Rosa Vindel López ^{(es)} | AP |
| 54 | Elena Vázquez Menéndez ^{(es)} | PSOE |
| 55 | Joaquín Ximénez de Embún y Ramonell | CDS |
| 56 | Nicolás Piñeiro Cuesta | AP |
| 57 | Saturnino Ureña Fernández | PSOE |
| 58 | Luis Manuel Partida Brunete | AP |
| 59 | Eulalia García Sánchez | PSOE |
| 60 | José Vicente Cebrián Echarri | CDS |
| 61 | Juan José Azcona Olondriz | IU |
| 62 | José María Federico Corral | AP |
| 63 | Ángel Luis del Castillo Gordo | PSOE |
| 64 | Jesús Pedroche Nieto ^{(es)} | AP |
| 65 | Juan Antonio Ruiz Castillo | PSOE |
| 66 | Abel Gonzalo Cádiz Ruiz | CDS |
| 67 | José Emilio Sánchez Cuenca | PSOE |
| 68 | Juan Van-Halen Acedo | AP |
| 69 | Sócrates Gómez Pérez ^{(es)} | PSOE |
| 70 | María del Pilar Bidagor Altuna | AP |
| 71 | Carlos Pérez Díaz | PSOE |
| 72 | Luis Rufilanchas Serrano | CDS |
| 73 | Gustavo Severien Tigeras | AP |
| 74 | Luis Alonso Novo | IU |
| 75 | Alejandro Lucas Fernández Martín | PSOE |
| 76 | Julio Pacheco Benito | AP |
| 77 | Rafael García Fernández | PSOE |
| 78 | Francisco Javier García Núñez | CDS |
| 79 | Benjamín Castro Yuste | PSOE |
| 80 | Jesús Adriano Valverde Bocanegra | AP |
| 81 | José Ramón García Menéndez | PSOE |
| 82 | Ana Isabel Mariño Ortega ^{(es)} | AP |
| 83 | Juan Francisco Sánchez-Herrera Herencia | CDS |
| 84 | Jesús Pérez González | PSOE |
| 85 | Juan Antonio Cánovas del Castillo Fraile | AP |
| 86 | Salvador Torrecilla Montal | IU |
| 87 | Miguel Peydró Caro | PSOE |
| 88 | Juan Soler-Espiauba Gallo ^{(es)} | AP |
| 89 | Manuel Dapena Baqueiro ^{(gl)} | CDS |
| 90 | Timoteo Mayoral Marqués | PSOE |
| 91 | José Luis Alvarez de Francisco | AP |
| 92 | Juan Sánchez Fernández | PSOE |
| 93 | Manuel Jesús Casero Nuño | PSOE |
| 94 | María Teresa de Lara Carbó ^{(es)} | AP |
| 95 | Juan José Arnela Terroso | CDS |
| 96 | Matías Castejón Núñez | PSOE |

== Aftermath ==
=== Government formation ===
Investiture; Nomination of Joaquín Leguina (PSOE)
| Ballot → | 17 July 1987 | 20 July 1987 |
| Required majority → | 49 out of 96 | Simple |
| Yes: • PSOE (40) (39 on 20 Jul) | 40 / 96 | 39 / 96 |
| No: • AP (32) (28 on 20 Jul) | 32 / 96 | 28 / 96 |
| Abstentions: • CDS (16); • IU (7) (5 on 20 Jul) | 23 / 96 | 21 / 96 |
| Absentees: • AP (4) (on 20 Jul); • IU (2) (on 20 Jul); • PSOE (1) (on 20 Jul); • CDS (1) | 1 / 96 | 8 / 96 |

=== 1989 motion of no confidence ===
Motion of no confidence Nomination of Alberto Ruiz-Gallardón (AP)
| Ballot → | 21 June 1989 (Note: 7 IU MPs cast invalid ballots.) |
| Required majority → | 49 out of 96 |
| Yes: • AP (30); • CDS (17); • Independent (1) | 48 / 96 |
| No: • PSOE (40) | 40 / 96 |
| Abstentions: • PRIM (1) | 1 / 96 |
| Absentees | 0 / 96 |

== Bibliography ==
- Ley Orgánica 3/1983, de 25 de febrero, de Estatuto de Autonomía de la Comunidad de Madrid (Organic Law 3/1983). Official State Gazette (in Spanish). 25 February 1983 [version as of 1 March 1983]. BOE-A-1983-6317.
- Ley Orgánica 5/1985, de 19 de junio, del Régimen Electoral General (Organic Law 5/1985). Official State Gazette (in Spanish). 19 June 1985 [version as of 3 April 1987]. BOE-A-1985-11672.
- Ley 11/1986, de 16 de diciembre, Electoral de la Comunidad de Madrid (Law 11/1986). Official State Gazette (in Spanish). 16 December 1986 [version as of 26 December 1986]. BOE-A-1987-4255.
- Decreto 22/1987, de 13 de abril, de convocatoria de elecciones a la Asamblea de Madrid (Decree 22/1987). Official State Gazette (in Spanish). 13 April 1987. BOE-A-1987-9236.
