= 1987 Spanish local elections in the Community of Madrid =

This article presents the results breakdown of the local elections held in the Community of Madrid on 10 June 1987. The following tables show detailed results in the autonomous community's most populous municipalities, sorted alphabetically.

== City control ==
The following table lists party control in the most populous municipalities, including provincial capitals (highlighted in bold). Gains for a party are highlighted in that party's colour.

| Municipality | Population | Previous control | New control |
|---|---|---|---|
| Alcalá de Henares | 144,268 | Spanish Socialist Workers' Party (PSOE) | Spanish Socialist Workers' Party (PSOE) |
| Alcobendas | 70,227 | Spanish Socialist Workers' Party (PSOE) | Spanish Socialist Workers' Party (PSOE) |
| Alcorcón | 137,884 | Spanish Socialist Workers' Party (PSOE) | Spanish Socialist Workers' Party (PSOE) |
| Coslada | 64,826 | United Left (IU) | United Left (IU) |
| Fuenlabrada | 119,848 | Spanish Socialist Workers' Party (PSOE) | Spanish Socialist Workers' Party (PSOE) |
| Getafe | 131,840 | Spanish Socialist Workers' Party (PSOE) | Spanish Socialist Workers' Party (PSOE) |
| Leganés | 167,783 | Spanish Socialist Workers' Party (PSOE) | Spanish Socialist Workers' Party (PSOE) |
| **Madrid** | 3,058,182 | Spanish Socialist Workers' Party (PSOE) | Spanish Socialist Workers' Party (PSOE) (CDS in 1989) |
| Móstoles | 175,133 | Spanish Socialist Workers' Party (PSOE) | Spanish Socialist Workers' Party (PSOE) |
| Parla | 63,963 | Spanish Socialist Workers' Party (PSOE) | Spanish Socialist Workers' Party (PSOE) |
| Torrejón de Ardoz | 80,066 | Spanish Socialist Workers' Party (PSOE) | Spanish Socialist Workers' Party (PSOE) |

== Municipalities ==
=== Alcalá de Henares ===
Population: 144,268

← Summary of the 10 June 1987 City Council of Alcalá de Henares election results →
| Parties and alliances | Popular vote | | | Seats | |
| Parties and alliances | Votes | % | ±pp | Total | +/− |
|---|---|---|---|---|---|
| Spanish Socialist Workers' Party (PSOE) | 26,960 | 43.86 | −13.49 | 13 | −4 |
| Democratic and Social Centre (CDS) | 11,415 | 18.57 | +14.99 | 5 | +5 |
| People's Alliance (AP)^{1} | 10,306 | 16.77 | −4.11 | 5 | −1 |
| United Left (IU)^{2} | 7,876 | 12.81 | −1.15 | 4 | ±0 |
| Workers' Party of Spain–Communist Unity (PTE–UC) | 1,592 | 2.59 | New | 0 | ±0 |
| The Greens (LV) | 1,077 | 1.75 | New | 0 | ±0 |
| Green Party of Alcalá de Henares (VERDE) | 654 | 1.06 | New | 0 | ±0 |
| People's Democratic Party (PDP) | 471 | 0.77 | New | 0 | ±0 |
| Humanist Platform (PH) | 197 | 0.32 | New | 0 | ±0 |
| Republican Popular Unity (UPR)^{3} | 126 | 0.20 | +0.04 | 0 | ±0 |
| Blank ballots | 790 | 1.29 | +1.29 | | |
| Total | 61,464 | | | 27 | ±0 |
| Valid votes | 61,464 | 98.61 | −1.39 | | |
| Invalid votes | 864 | 1.39 | +1.39 | | |
| Votes cast / turnout | 62,328 | 65.17 | +2.01 | | |
| Abstentions | 33,311 | 34.83 | −2.01 | | |
| Registered voters | 95,639 | | | | |
Sources
Footnotes: ^{1} People's Alliance results are compared to People's Coalition totals in the 1983 election.; ^{2} United Left results are compared to Communist Party of Spain totals in the 1983 election.; ^{3} Republican Popular Unity results are compared to Popular Struggle Coalition totals in the 1983 election.

=== Alcobendas ===
Population: 70,227

← Summary of the 10 June 1987 City Council of Alcobendas election results →
| Parties and alliances | Popular vote | | | Seats | |
| Parties and alliances | Votes | % | ±pp | Total | +/− |
|---|---|---|---|---|---|
| Spanish Socialist Workers' Party (PSOE) | 15,157 | 49.81 | −9.23 | 14 | −2 |
| People's Alliance (AP)^{1} | 7,254 | 23.84 | −4.58 | 7 | ±0 |
| Democratic and Social Centre (CDS) | 4,747 | 15.60 | +12.51 | 4 | +4 |
| United Left (IU)^{2} | 1,196 | 3.93 | −5.52 | 0 | −2 |
| Workers' Party of Spain–Communist Unity (PTE–UC) | 1,016 | 3.34 | New | 0 | ±0 |
| Autonomic Independent Group of Madrid (AIAM) | 309 | 1.02 | New | 0 | ±0 |
| Humanist Platform (PH) | 195 | 0.64 | New | 0 | ±0 |
| People's Democratic Party (PDP) | 125 | 0.41 | New | 0 | ±0 |
| Spanish Phalanx of the CNSO (FE–JONS) | 110 | 0.36 | New | 0 | ±0 |
| Blank ballots | 322 | 1.06 | +1.06 | | |
| Total | 30,431 | | | 25 | ±0 |
| Valid votes | 30,431 | 98.96 | −1.04 | | |
| Invalid votes | 321 | 1.04 | +1.04 | | |
| Votes cast / turnout | 30,752 | 69.81 | +3.34 | | |
| Abstentions | 13,296 | 30.19 | −3.34 | | |
| Registered voters | 44,048 | | | | |
Sources
Footnotes: ^{1} People's Alliance results are compared to People's Coalition totals in the 1983 election.; ^{2} United Left results are compared to Communist Party of Spain totals in the 1983 election.

=== Alcorcón ===
Population: 137,884

← Summary of the 10 June 1987 City Council of Alcorcón election results →
| Parties and alliances | Popular vote | | | Seats | |
| Parties and alliances | Votes | % | ±pp | Total | +/− |
|---|---|---|---|---|---|
| Spanish Socialist Workers' Party (PSOE) | 29,392 | 46.90 | −19.64 | 14 | −5 |
| Democratic and Social Centre (CDS) | 12,953 | 20.67 | +17.98 | 6 | +6 |
| People's Alliance (AP)^{1} | 11,119 | 17.74 | −4.23 | 5 | −1 |
| United Left (IU)^{2} | 5,110 | 8.15 | +0.10 | 2 | ±0 |
| Autonomic Independent Group of Madrid (AIAM) | 1,589 | 2.54 | New | 0 | ±0 |
| Workers' Party of Spain–Communist Unity (PTE–UC) | 1,133 | 1.81 | New | 0 | ±0 |
| Humanist Platform (PH) | 448 | 0.71 | New | 0 | ±0 |
| People's Democratic Party (PDP) | 175 | 0.28 | New | 0 | ±0 |
| Blank ballots | 744 | 1.19 | +1.19 | | |
| Total | 62,663 | | | 27 | ±0 |
| Valid votes | 62,663 | 98.78 | −1.22 | | |
| Invalid votes | 776 | 1.22 | +1.22 | | |
| Votes cast / turnout | 63,439 | 69.06 | +1.88 | | |
| Abstentions | 28,420 | 30.94 | −1.88 | | |
| Registered voters | 91,859 | | | | |
Sources
Footnotes: ^{1} People's Alliance results are compared to People's Coalition totals in the 1983 election.; ^{2} United Left results are compared to Communist Party of Spain totals in the 1983 election.

=== Coslada ===
Population: 64,826

← Summary of the 10 June 1987 City Council of Coslada election results →
| Parties and alliances | Popular vote | | | Seats | |
| Parties and alliances | Votes | % | ±pp | Total | +/− |
|---|---|---|---|---|---|
| United Left (IU)^{1} | 10,066 | 36.11 | −17.87 | 10 | −4 |
| Spanish Socialist Workers' Party (PSOE) | 9,598 | 34.43 | +0.53 | 10 | +2 |
| Democratic and Social Centre (CDS) | 3,742 | 13.43 | New | 3 | +3 |
| People's Alliance (AP)^{2} | 2,607 | 9.35 | −2.78 | 2 | −1 |
| Workers' Party of Spain–Communist Unity (PTE–UC) | 1,309 | 4.70 | New | 0 | ±0 |
| Humanist Platform (PH) | 211 | 0.76 | New | 0 | ±0 |
| Blank ballots | 340 | 1.22 | +1.22 | | |
| Total | 27,873 | | | 25 | ±0 |
| Valid votes | 27,873 | 98.85 | −1.15 | | |
| Invalid votes | 324 | 1.15 | +1.15 | | |
| Votes cast / turnout | 28,197 | 68.09 | −2.37 | | |
| Abstentions | 13,212 | 31.91 | +2.37 | | |
| Registered voters | 41,409 | | | | |
Sources
Footnotes: ^{1} United Left results are compared to Communist Party of Spain totals in the 1983 election.; ^{2} People's Alliance results are compared to People's Coalition totals in the 1983 election.

=== Fuenlabrada ===
Population: 119,848

← Summary of the 10 June 1987 City Council of Fuenlabrada election results →
| Parties and alliances | Popular vote | | | Seats | |
| Parties and alliances | Votes | % | ±pp | Total | +/− |
|---|---|---|---|---|---|
| Spanish Socialist Workers' Party (PSOE) | 25,680 | 56.80 | −8.65 | 17 | −1 |
| Democratic and Social Centre (CDS) | 7,288 | 16.12 | +14.37 | 5 | +5 |
| People's Alliance (AP)^{1} | 5,356 | 11.85 | −1.71 | 3 | ±0 |
| United Left (IU)^{2} | 3,767 | 8.33 | −2.38 | 2 | −1 |
| Workers' Party of Spain–Communist Unity (PTE–UC) | 1,941 | 4.29 | New | 0 | ±0 |
| Humanist Platform (PH) | 258 | 0.57 | New | 0 | ±0 |
| Spanish Phalanx of the CNSO (FE–JONS) | 219 | 0.48 | New | 0 | ±0 |
| People's Democratic Party (PDP) | 113 | 0.25 | New | 0 | ±0 |
| Republican Popular Unity (UPR) | 98 | 0.22 | New | 0 | ±0 |
| Blank ballots | 489 | 1.08 | +1.08 | | |
| Total | 45,209 | | | 27 | +2 |
| Valid votes | 45,209 | 98.70 | −1.30 | | |
| Invalid votes | 597 | 1.30 | +1.30 | | |
| Votes cast / turnout | 45,806 | 63.49 | +3.44 | | |
| Abstentions | 26,336 | 36.51 | −3.44 | | |
| Registered voters | 72,142 | | | | |
Sources
Footnotes: ^{1} People's Alliance results are compared to People's Coalition totals in the 1983 election.; ^{2} United Left results are compared to Communist Party of Spain totals in the 1983 election.

=== Getafe ===
Population: 131,840

← Summary of the 10 June 1987 City Council of Getafe election results →
| Parties and alliances | Popular vote | | | Seats | |
| Parties and alliances | Votes | % | ±pp | Total | +/− |
|---|---|---|---|---|---|
| Spanish Socialist Workers' Party (PSOE) | 29,640 | 47.29 | −15.39 | 14 | −5 |
| United Left (IU)^{1} | 10,415 | 16.62 | +3.92 | 5 | +2 |
| Democratic and Social Centre (CDS) | 9,565 | 15.26 | +13.05 | 4 | +4 |
| People's Alliance (AP)^{2} | 8,291 | 13.23 | −5.25 | 4 | −1 |
| Workers' Party of Spain–Communist Unity (PTE–UC) | 1,413 | 2.25 | New | 0 | ±0 |
| People's Democratic Party (PDP) | 1,195 | 1.91 | New | 0 | ±0 |
| Workers' Socialist Party (PST) | 416 | 0.66 | −0.10 | 0 | ±0 |
| Humanist Platform (PH) | 308 | 0.49 | New | 0 | ±0 |
| Internationalist Socialist Workers' Party (POSI) | 234 | 0.37 | New | 0 | ±0 |
| Blank ballots | 1,201 | 1.92 | +1.92 | | |
| Total | 62,678 | | | 27 | ±0 |
| Valid votes | 62,678 | 98.48 | −1.52 | | |
| Invalid votes | 967 | 1.52 | +1.52 | | |
| Votes cast / turnout | 63,645 | 71.94 | +1.78 | | |
| Abstentions | 24,826 | 28.06 | −1.78 | | |
| Registered voters | 88,471 | | | | |
Sources
Footnotes: ^{1} United Left results are compared to Communist Party of Spain totals in the 1983 election.; ^{2} People's Alliance results are compared to People's Coalition totals in the 1983 election.

=== Leganés ===
Population: 167,783

← Summary of the 10 June 1987 City Council of Leganés election results →
| Parties and alliances | Popular vote | | | Seats | |
| Parties and alliances | Votes | % | ±pp | Total | +/− |
|---|---|---|---|---|---|
| Spanish Socialist Workers' Party (PSOE) | 40,499 | 53.27 | −16.60 | 16 | −4 |
| Democratic and Social Centre (CDS) | 12,489 | 16.43 | +14.03 | 5 | +5 |
| People's Alliance (AP)^{1} | 9,231 | 12.14 | −1.41 | 3 | −1 |
| United Left (IU)^{2} | 8,292 | 10.91 | −2.32 | 3 | ±0 |
| Workers' Party of Spain–Communist Unity (PTE–UC) | 3,401 | 4.47 | New | 0 | ±0 |
| Humanist Platform (PH) | 478 | 0.63 | New | 0 | ±0 |
| People's Democratic Party (PDP) | 360 | 0.47 | New | 0 | ±0 |
| Spanish Phalanx of the CNSO (FE–JONS) | 191 | 0.25 | New | 0 | ±0 |
| Republican Popular Unity (UPR)^{3} | 165 | 0.22 | +0.08 | 0 | ±0 |
| Internationalist Socialist Workers' Party (POSI) | 131 | 0.17 | New | 0 | ±0 |
| Blank ballots | 786 | 1.03 | +1.03 | | |
| Total | 76,023 | | | 27 | ±0 |
| Valid votes | 76,023 | 98.50 | −1.50 | | |
| Invalid votes | 1,154 | 1.50 | +1.50 | | |
| Votes cast / turnout | 77,177 | 69.15 | +1.04 | | |
| Abstentions | 34,433 | 30.85 | −1.04 | | |
| Registered voters | 111,610 | | | | |
Sources
Footnotes: ^{1} People's Alliance results are compared to People's Coalition totals in the 1983 election.; ^{2} United Left results are compared to Communist Party of Spain totals in the 1983 election.; ^{3} Republican Popular Unity results are compared to Popular Struggle Coalition totals in the 1983 election.

=== Madrid ===
Population: 3,058,182

=== Móstoles ===
Population: 175,133

← Summary of the 10 June 1987 City Council of Móstoles election results →
| Parties and alliances | Popular vote | | | Seats | |
| Parties and alliances | Votes | % | ±pp | Total | +/− |
|---|---|---|---|---|---|
| Spanish Socialist Workers' Party (PSOE) | 31,071 | 45.33 | −23.94 | 13 | −7 |
| Democratic and Social Centre (CDS) | 14,851 | 21.67 | +19.49 | 6 | +6 |
| People's Alliance (AP)^{1} | 11,523 | 16.81 | −0.25 | 5 | ±0 |
| United Left (IU)^{2} | 6,717 | 9.80 | −0.85 | 3 | +1 |
| Workers' Party of Spain–Communist Unity (PTE–UC) | 1,922 | 2.80 | New | 0 | ±0 |
| Autonomic Independent Group of Madrid (AIAM) | 672 | 0.98 | New | 0 | ±0 |
| Humanist Platform (PH) | 397 | 0.58 | New | 0 | ±0 |
| Revolutionary Communist League (LCR) | 323 | 0.47 | +0.27 | 0 | ±0 |
| People's Democratic Party (PDP) | 315 | 0.46 | New | 0 | ±0 |
| Blank ballots | 750 | 1.09 | +1.09 | | |
| Total | 68,541 | | | 27 | ±0 |
| Valid votes | 68,541 | 98.80 | −1.20 | | |
| Invalid votes | 832 | 1.20 | +1.20 | | |
| Votes cast / turnout | 69,373 | 63.41 | +0.16 | | |
| Abstentions | 40,025 | 36.59 | −0.16 | | |
| Registered voters | 109,398 | | | | |
Sources
Footnotes: ^{1} People's Alliance results are compared to People's Coalition totals in the 1983 election.; ^{2} United Left results are compared to the combined totals of Communist Party of Spain and Socialist Action Party in the 1983 election.

=== Parla ===
Population: 63,963

← Summary of the 10 June 1987 City Council of Parla election results →
| Parties and alliances | Popular vote | | | Seats | |
| Parties and alliances | Votes | % | ±pp | Total | +/− |
|---|---|---|---|---|---|
| Spanish Socialist Workers' Party (PSOE) | 13,033 | 51.34 | −25.67 | 15 | −5 |
| United Left (IU)^{1} | 4,330 | 17.06 | +5.74 | 4 | +1 |
| Democratic and Social Centre (CDS) | 3,278 | 12.91 | New | 3 | +3 |
| People's Alliance (AP)^{2} | 2,932 | 11.55 | +0.28 | 3 | +1 |
| Workers' Party of Spain–Communist Unity (PTE–UC) | 1,077 | 4.24 | New | 0 | ±0 |
| People's Democratic Party (PDP) | 211 | 0.83 | New | 0 | ±0 |
| Humanist Platform (PH) | 156 | 0.61 | New | 0 | ±0 |
| Communist Workers' League (LOC) | 118 | 0.46 | New | 0 | ±0 |
| Blank ballots | 253 | 1.00 | +1.00 | | |
| Total | 25,388 | | | 25 | ±0 |
| Valid votes | 25,388 | 98.87 | −1.13 | | |
| Invalid votes | 289 | 1.13 | +1.13 | | |
| Votes cast / turnout | 25,677 | 66.58 | −2.93 | | |
| Abstentions | 12,888 | 33.42 | +2.93 | | |
| Registered voters | 38,565 | | | | |
Sources
Footnotes: ^{1} United Left results are compared to Communist Party of Spain totals in the 1983 election.; ^{2} People's Alliance results are compared to People's Coalition totals in the 1983 election.

=== Torrejón de Ardoz ===
Population: 80,066

← Summary of the 10 June 1987 City Council of Torrejón de Ardoz election results →
| Parties and alliances | Popular vote | | | Seats | |
| Parties and alliances | Votes | % | ±pp | Total | +/− |
|---|---|---|---|---|---|
| Spanish Socialist Workers' Party (PSOE) | 13,404 | 40.81 | −23.83 | 11 | −6 |
| Democratic and Social Centre (CDS) | 6,013 | 18.31 | +15.50 | 5 | +5 |
| People's Alliance (AP)^{1} | 5,486 | 16.70 | −1.37 | 4 | −1 |
| United Left (IU)^{2} | 4,971 | 15.13 | +0.65 | 4 | +1 |
| Workers' Party of Spain–Communist Unity (PTE–UC) | 1,874 | 5.71 | New | 1 | +1 |
| People's Democratic Party (PDP) | 314 | 0.96 | New | 0 | ±0 |
| Humanist Platform (PH) | 295 | 0.90 | New | 0 | ±0 |
| Blank ballots | 491 | 1.49 | +1.49 | | |
| Total | 32,848 | | | 25 | ±0 |
| Valid votes | 32,848 | 99.04 | −0.96 | | |
| Invalid votes | 319 | 0.96 | +0.96 | | |
| Votes cast / turnout | 33,167 | 67.13 | +2.53 | | |
| Abstentions | 16,240 | 32.87 | −2.53 | | |
| Registered voters | 49,407 | | | | |
Sources
Footnotes: ^{1} People's Alliance results are compared to People's Coalition totals in the 1983 election.; ^{2} United Left results are compared to Communist Party of Spain totals in the 1983 election.

== See also ==
- 1987 Madrilenian regional election
