= Jaime Lissavetzky =

Spanish politician

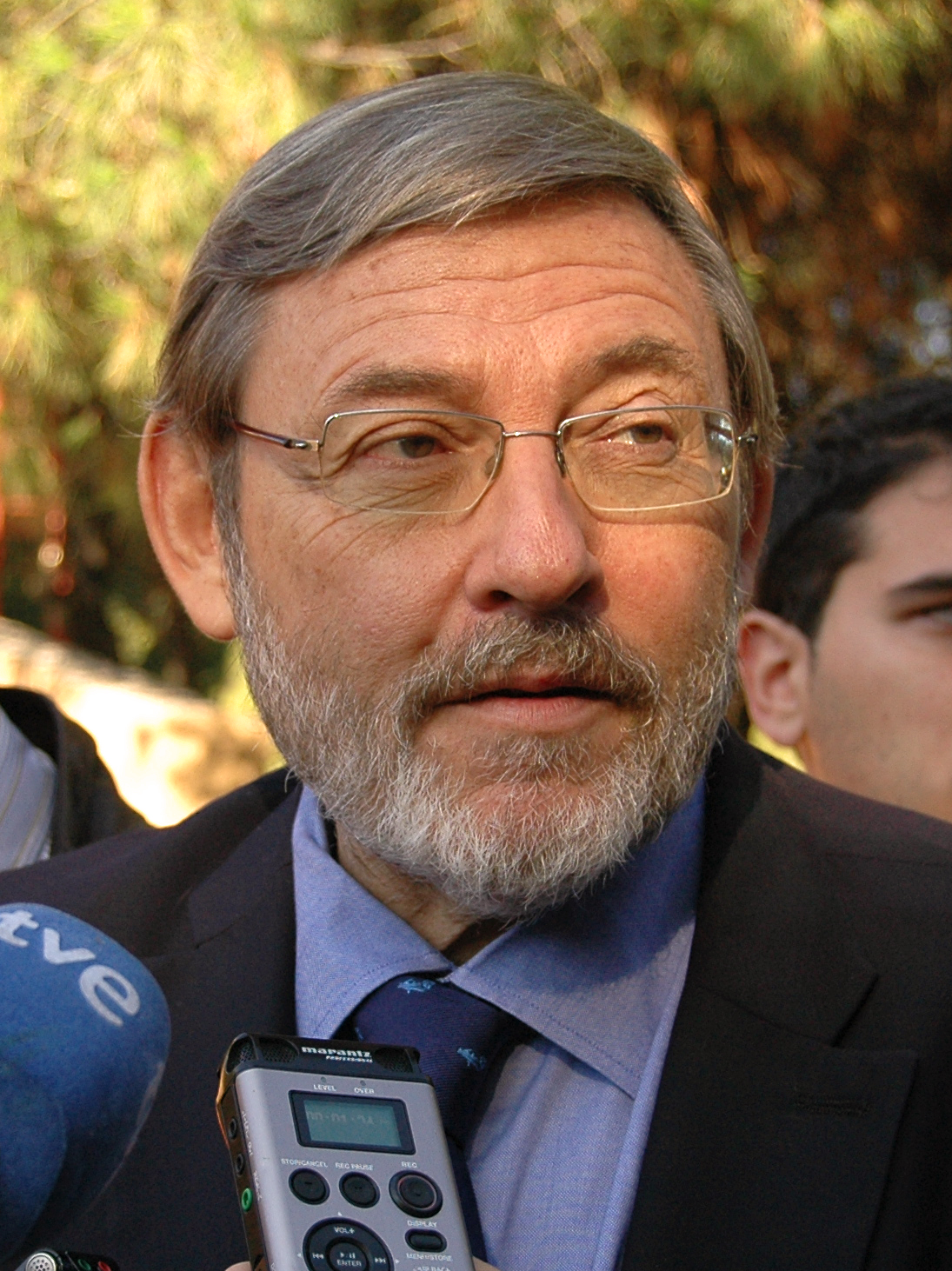
- Lissavetzky on 23 October 2012 in Entrevías

President of the National Sport Council
- In office 20 April 2004 – 1 April 2011
- Prime Minister: José Luis Rodríguez Zapatero
- Preceded by: Juan Antonio Gómez-Angulo
- Succeeded by: Albert Soler Sicilia

Councillor of Education and Youth of the Community of Madrid
- In office 26 September 1985 – 23 July 1991
- President: Joaquín Leguina
- Preceded by: Manuel de la Rocha Rubí
- Succeeded by: Himself (Education, Culture and Sports)

Councillor of Education, Culture and Sports of the Community of Madrid
- In office 23 July 1991 – 30 June 1995
- President: Joaquín Leguina
- Preceded by: Ramón Espinar Gallego (Culture); Himself (Education and Youth)
- Succeeded by: Gustavo Villapalos

Member of the Congress of Deputies
- In office 27 March 2000 – 20 April 2004
- Constituency: Madrid

Member of the Senate
- In office 3 March 1996 – 12 March 2000
- President: Joaquín Leguina

Member of the Assembly of Madrid
- In office 8 May 1983 – 12 March 2000

Member of Madrid Municipal Council
- In office 16 June 2011 – 13 June 2015

Personal details
- Born: 27 September 1951 (age 75) Madrid
- Citizenship: Spanish
- Party: Spanish Socialist Worker's Party
- Education: Complutense University of Madrid
- Occupation: Chemist, politician

Jaime Lissavetzky Díez (born 27 September 1951) is a Spanish chemist and politician. Secretary of State for Sport (2004–2011) and regional minister of Education of the Government of the Community of Madrid. He was member of the 1st, 2nd, 3rd, 4th and 5th terms of the Assembly of Madrid, as well as member of the 8th Congress of Deputies and city councillor in the City Council of Madrid.

== Early life ==
Lissavetzky was born on 27 September 1951 in Madrid. He is son of a Ukrainian father based in Spain and a Spanish mother. He has a PhD in Chemistry from the Complutense University of Madrid (UCM). He became a member of the Spanish Socialist Worker's Party (PSOE) in 1974. Lissavetzky, who worked as associate professor of Chemistry in the UCM, became a researcher of the Spanish National Research Council (CSIC) in 1979.

He was placed 38th in the PSOE's list of candidates for the first elections to the Assembly of Madrid, and became regional MP. He renovated his seat in the Assembly of Madrid in the 1987, 1991, 1995, 1999 elections. He was also Senator designate by the regional parliament, while also holding the position of Spokesperson of the PSOE in the regional chamber.

He was appointed regional minister of Education and Youth in the cabinet of Joaquín Leguina in 1985, replacing Manuel de la Rocha Rubí. The office was renamed to regional minister of Education, Youth and Sports in 1991. The Charles III University of Madrid was opened during his mandate (1989), as well as the stadium of La Peineta (1994).

After the arrival of José Luis Rodríguez Zapatero to the presidency of the Government of Spain, Lissavetzky was appointed as Secretary of State for the Sport on 20 April 2004.

He was the first candidate in the PSOE's list for the 2011 municipal election in Madrid (and subsequently proposed PSOE candidate to the Mayorship), becoming the leader of the opposition in the City Council for the 2011–2015 period. In 2014 he announced he wouldn't run for the lead position in the PSOE list in the 2015 local election, paving the way for the candidacy of Antonio Miguel Carmona.

== Honors ==
- Great Cross of the Civil Order of Alfonso X, the Wise (1996)
- Great Cross of the Order of Civil Merit (2011)
- Great Cross of the Royal Order of Sports Merit (2011)
- Great Cross of the Order of Dos de Mayo (2015)

Political offices
Preceded by Manuel de la Rocha Rubí	Councillor of Education and Youth of the Community of Madrid; 1985–1991	Succeeded by Himself (Education, Culture and Sports)
Preceded by Ramón Espinar Gallego (Culture); Himself (Education and Youth)	Councillor of Education, Culture and Sports of the Community of Madrid; 1991–1995	Succeeded by Gustavo Villapalos
Preceded by Juan Antonio Gómez-Angulo	President of the National Sport Council; 2004–2011	Succeeded by Albert Soler Sicilia
Party political offices
Preceded by Teófilo Serrano	Secretary-General of the Spanish Socialist Workers' Party of Madrid; 1994–2000	Succeeded by Rafael Simancas
Preceded by María Dolores García-Hierro	Leader of the Socialist Group in the Assembly of Madrid; 1995–2000	Succeeded by Pedro Sabando
Preceded by David Lucas Parrón	Leader of the Socialist Group in the Madrid City Council; 2011–2015	Succeeded by Antonio Miguel Carmona
