= 1983 Spanish local elections in the Community of Madrid =

This article presents the results breakdown of the local elections held in the Community of Madrid on 8 May 1983. The following tables show detailed results in the autonomous community's most populous municipalities, sorted alphabetically.

== City control ==
The following table lists party control in the most populous municipalities, including provincial capitals (highlighted in bold). Gains for a party are highlighted in that party's colour.

Municipality	Population	Previous control	New control
Alcalá de Henares	137,169	Spanish Socialist Workers' Party (PSOE)	Spanish Socialist Workers' Party (PSOE)
Alcobendas	63,731	Spanish Socialist Workers' Party (PSOE)	Spanish Socialist Workers' Party (PSOE)
Alcorcón	140,957	Spanish Socialist Workers' Party (PSOE)	Spanish Socialist Workers' Party (PSOE)
Coslada	53,730	Spanish Socialist Workers' Party (PSOE)	Communist Party of Spain (PCE)
Fuenlabrada	78,096	Spanish Socialist Workers' Party (PSOE)	Spanish Socialist Workers' Party (PSOE)
Getafe	126,558	Spanish Socialist Workers' Party (PSOE)	Spanish Socialist Workers' Party (PSOE)
Leganés	163,910	Spanish Socialist Workers' Party (PSOE)	Spanish Socialist Workers' Party (PSOE)
**Madrid**	3,158,818	Spanish Socialist Workers' Party (PSOE)	Spanish Socialist Workers' Party (PSOE)
Móstoles	150,259	Spanish Socialist Workers' Party (PSOE)	Spanish Socialist Workers' Party (PSOE)
Parla	56,318	Spanish Socialist Workers' Party (PSOE)	Spanish Socialist Workers' Party (PSOE)
Torrejón de Ardoz	75,599	Spanish Socialist Workers' Party (PSOE)	Spanish Socialist Workers' Party (PSOE)

== Municipalities ==
=== Alcalá de Henares ===
Population: 137,169

← Summary of the 8 May 1983 City Council of Alcalá de Henares election results →
Parties and alliances	Popular vote			Seats	
Parties and alliances	Votes	%	±pp	Total	+/−
Spanish Socialist Workers' Party (PSOE)	31,849	57.35	+17.82	17	+5
People's Coalition (AP–PDP–UL)^{1}	11,596	20.88	+18.10	6	+6
Communist Party of Spain (PCE)	7,752	13.96	−7.72	4	−2
Democratic and Social Centre (CDS)	1,990	3.58	New	0	±0
Left Movement of Alcalá (MIA)	1,497	2.70	New	0	±0
Independent (INDEP)	385	0.69	New	0	±0
Liberal Democratic Party (PDL)	371	0.67	New	0	±0
Popular Struggle Coalition (CLP)	91	0.16	New	0	±0
Union of the Democratic Centre (UCD)	n/a	n/a	−23.45	0	−7
Workers' Revolutionary Organization (ORT)	n/a	n/a	−9.45	0	−2
Blank ballots	0	0.00	±0.00		
Total	55,531			27	±0
Valid votes	55,531	100.00	±0.00		
Invalid votes	0	0.00	±0.00		
Votes cast / turnout	55,531	63.16	+5.22		
Abstentions	32,391	36.84	−5.22		
Registered voters	87,922				
Sources
Footnotes: ^{1} People's Coalition results are compared to Democratic Coalition totals in the 1979 election.

=== Alcobendas ===
Population: 63,731

← Summary of the 8 May 1983 City Council of Alcobendas election results →
Parties and alliances	Popular vote			Seats	
Parties and alliances	Votes	%	±pp	Total	+/−
Spanish Socialist Workers' Party (PSOE)	15,174	59.04	+11.13	16	+3
People's Coalition (AP–PDP–UL)	7,303	28.42	New	7	+7
Communist Party of Spain (PCE)	2,428	9.45	−12.56	2	−4
Democratic and Social Centre (CDS)	795	3.09	New	0	±0
Union of the Democratic Centre (UCD)	n/a	n/a	−20.69	0	−5
Independents (INDEP)	n/a	n/a	−6.08	0	−1
Blank ballots	0	0.00	±0.00		
Total	25,700			25	±0
Valid votes	25,700	100.00	±0.00		
Invalid votes	0	0.00	±0.00		
Votes cast / turnout	25,700	66.47	+5.84		
Abstentions	12,964	33.53	−5.84		
Registered voters	38,664				

=== Alcorcón ===
Population: 140,957

← Summary of the 8 May 1983 City Council of Alcorcón election results →
Parties and alliances	Popular vote			Seats	
Parties and alliances	Votes	%	±pp	Total	+/−
Spanish Socialist Workers' Party (PSOE)	39,540	66.54	+19.49	19	+5
People's Coalition (AP–PDP–UL)^{1}	13,052	21.97	+20.08	6	+6
Communist Party of Spain (PCE)	4,782	8.05	−14.58	2	−5
Democratic and Social Centre (CDS)	1,601	2.69	New	0	±0
Workers' Socialist Party (PST)	444	0.75	New	0	±0
Union of the Democratic Centre (UCD)	n/a	n/a	−20.48	0	−6
Blank ballots	0	0.00	±0.00		
Total	59,419			27	±0
Valid votes	59,419	100.00	±0.00		
Invalid votes	0	0.00	±0.00		
Votes cast / turnout	59,419	67.18	+8.71		
Abstentions	29,031	32.82	−8.71		
Registered voters	88,450				
Sources
Footnotes: ^{1} People's Coalition results are compared to Democratic Coalition totals in the 1979 election.

=== Coslada ===
Population: 53,730

← Summary of the 8 May 1983 City Council of Coslada election results →
Parties and alliances	Popular vote			Seats	
Parties and alliances	Votes	%	±pp	Total	+/−
Communist Party of Spain (PCE)	12,930	53.98	+9.64	14	+5
Spanish Socialist Workers' Party (PSOE)	8,120	33.90	−1.34	8	±0
People's Coalition (AP–PDP–UL)	2,905	12.13	New	3	+3
Union of the Democratic Centre (UCD)	n/a	n/a	−14.21	0	−3
Workers' Revolutionary Organization (ORT)	n/a	n/a	−6.20	0	−1
Blank ballots	0	0.00	±0.00		
Total	23,955			25	+4
Valid votes	23,955	100.00	±0.00		
Invalid votes	0	0.00	±0.00		
Votes cast / turnout	23,955	70.46	+2.61		
Abstentions	10,044	29.54	−2.61		
Registered voters	33,999				

=== Fuenlabrada ===
Population: 78,096

← Summary of the 8 May 1983 City Council of Fuenlabrada election results →
Parties and alliances	Popular vote			Seats	
Parties and alliances	Votes	%	±pp	Total	+/−
Spanish Socialist Workers' Party (PSOE)	20,296	65.45	+26.54	18	+9
People's Coalition (AP–PDP–UL)	4,206	13.56	New	3	+3
Communist Party of Spain (PCE)	3,321	10.71	−6.74	3	−1
Independents (INDEP)	1,867	6.02	−0.13	1	±0
Democratic and Social Centre (CDS)	542	1.75	New	0	±0
Communist Candidacy (CC)	346	1.12	New	0	±0
Workers' Socialist Party (PST)	229	0.74	New	0	±0
Liberal Democratic Party (PDL)	202	0.65	New	0	±0
Union of the Democratic Centre (UCD)	n/a	n/a	−31.14	0	−7
Blank ballots	0	0.00	±0.00		
Total	31,009			25	+4
Valid votes	31,009	100.00	±0.00		
Invalid votes	0	0.00	±0.00		
Votes cast / turnout	31,009	60.05	+2.07		
Abstentions	20,628	39.95	−2.07		
Registered voters	51,637				

=== Getafe ===
Population: 126,558

← Summary of the 8 May 1983 City Council of Getafe election results →
Parties and alliances	Popular vote			Seats	
Parties and alliances	Votes	%	±pp	Total	+/−
Spanish Socialist Workers' Party (PSOE)	35,494	62.68	+27.50	19	+9
People's Coalition (AP–PDP–UL)^{1}	10,463	18.48	+15.60	5	+5
Communist Party of Spain (PCE)	7,191	12.70	−22.22	3	−7
Communist Candidacy (CC)	1,396	2.47	New	0	±0
Democratic and Social Centre (CDS)	1,249	2.21	New	0	±0
Workers' Socialist Party (PST)	432	0.76	New	0	±0
Communist League (LC)	271	0.48	New	0	±0
Independent (INDEP)	134	0.24	New	0	±0
Union of the Democratic Centre (UCD)	n/a	n/a	−17.97	0	−5
Workers' Revolutionary Organization (ORT)	n/a	n/a	−7.81	0	−2
Blank ballots	0	0.00	±0.00		
Total	56,630			27	±0
Valid votes	56,630	100.00	±0.00		
Invalid votes	0	0.00	±0.00		
Votes cast / turnout	56,630	70.16	+8.20		
Abstentions	24,089	29.84	−8.20		
Registered voters	80,719				
Sources
Footnotes: ^{1} People's Coalition results are compared to Democratic Coalition totals in the 1979 election.

=== Leganés ===
Population: 163,910

← Summary of the 8 May 1983 City Council of Leganés election results →
Parties and alliances	Popular vote			Seats	
Parties and alliances	Votes	%	±pp	Total	+/−
Spanish Socialist Workers' Party (PSOE)	48,694	69.87	+20.46	20	+6
People's Coalition (AP–PDP–UL)^{1}	9,442	13.55	+12.40	4	+4
Communist Party of Spain (PCE)	9,221	13.23	−15.15	3	−5
Democratic and Social Centre (CDS)	1,676	2.40	New	0	±0
Workers' Socialist Party (PST)	560	0.80	New	0	±0
Popular Struggle Coalition (CLP)	101	0.14	New	0	±0
Union of the Democratic Centre (UCD)	n/a	n/a	−15.25	0	−4
Workers' Revolutionary Organization (ORT)	n/a	n/a	−5.39	0	−1
Blank ballots	0	0.00	±0.00		
Total	69,694			27	±0
Valid votes	69,694	100.00	±0.00		
Invalid votes	0	0.00	±0.00		
Votes cast / turnout	69,694	68.11	+5.78		
Abstentions	32,632	31.89	−5.78		
Registered voters	102,326				
Sources
Footnotes: ^{1} People's Coalition results are compared to Democratic Coalition totals in the 1979 election.

=== Madrid ===
Population: 3,158,818

=== Móstoles ===
Population: 150,259

← Summary of the 8 May 1983 City Council of Móstoles election results →
Parties and alliances	Popular vote			Seats	
Parties and alliances	Votes	%	±pp	Total	+/−
Spanish Socialist Workers' Party (PSOE)	42,599	69.27	+27.75	20	+7
People's Coalition (AP–PDP–UL)^{1}	10,493	17.06	+14.25	5	+5
Communist Party of Spain (PCE)	6,125	9.96	−20.63	2	−8
Democratic and Social Centre (CDS)	1,339	2.18	New	0	±0
Socialist Action Party (PASOC)	427	0.69	New	0	±0
Communist Candidacy (CC)	332	0.54	New	0	±0
Revolutionary Communist League (LCR)	122	0.20	−0.08	0	±0
Communist Movement (MC)	60	0.10	−0.32	0	±0
Union of the Democratic Centre (UCD)	n/a	n/a	−13.53	0	−4
Blank ballots	0	0.00	±0.00		
Total	61,497			27	±0
Valid votes	61,497	100.00	±0.00		
Invalid votes	0	0.00	±0.00		
Votes cast / turnout	61,497	63.25	+9.05		
Abstentions	35,728	36.75	−9.05		
Registered voters	97,225				
Sources
Footnotes: ^{1} People's Coalition results are compared to Democratic Coalition totals in the 1979 election.

=== Parla ===
Population: 56,318

← Summary of the 8 May 1983 City Council of Parla election results →
Parties and alliances	Popular vote			Seats	
Parties and alliances	Votes	%	±pp	Total	+/−
Spanish Socialist Workers' Party (PSOE)	18,201	77.01	+37.44	20	+11
Communist Party of Spain (PCE)	2,675	11.32	−25.26	3	−5
People's Coalition (AP–PDP–UL)^{1}	2,663	11.27	+1.79	2	±0
Popular Struggle Coalition (CLP)	96	0.41	New	0	±0
Union of the Democratic Centre (UCD)	n/a	n/a	−7.33	0	−1
Party of Labour of Spain (PTE)	n/a	n/a	−5.26	0	−1
Blank ballots	0	0.00	±0.00		
Total	23,635			25	+4
Valid votes	23,635	100.00	±0.00		
Invalid votes	0	0.00	±0.00		
Votes cast / turnout	23,635	69.51	+5.52		
Abstentions	10,368	30.49	−5.52		
Registered voters	34,003				
Sources
Footnotes: ^{1} People's Coalition results are compared to Democratic Coalition totals in the 1979 election.

=== Torrejón de Ardoz ===
Population: 75,599

← Summary of the 8 May 1983 City Council of Torrejón de Ardoz election results →
Parties and alliances	Popular vote			Seats	
Parties and alliances	Votes	%	±pp	Total	+/−
Spanish Socialist Workers' Party (PSOE)	19,436	64.64	+20.43	17	+5
People's Coalition (AP–PDP–UL)	5,433	18.07	New	5	+5
Communist Party of Spain (PCE)	4,353	14.48	−14.15	3	−4
Democratic and Social Centre (CDS)	846	2.81	New	0	±0
Union of the Democratic Centre (UCD)	n/a	n/a	−14.67	0	−4
Independent (INDEP)	n/a	n/a	−7.75	0	−2
Blank ballots	0	0.00	±0.00		
Total	30,068			25	±0
Valid votes	30,068	100.00	±0.00		
Invalid votes	0	0.00	±0.00		
Votes cast / turnout	30,068	64.60	+5.25		
Abstentions	16,479	35.40	−5.25		
Registered voters	46,547				

== See also ==
- 1983 Madrilenian regional election
