= 1979 Spanish local elections in the Community of Madrid =

This article presents the results breakdown of the local elections held in the Community of Madrid on 3 April 1979. The following tables show detailed results in the autonomous community's most populous municipalities, sorted alphabetically.

== City control ==
The following table lists party control in the most populous municipalities, including provincial capitals (highlighted in bold).

Municipality	Population	New control
Alcalá de Henares	110,102	Spanish Socialist Workers' Party (PSOE)
Alcobendas	55,869	Spanish Socialist Workers' Party (PSOE)
Alcorcón	119,300	Spanish Socialist Workers' Party (PSOE)
Coslada	37,268	Communist Party of Spain (PCE) (PSOE in 1982)
Fuenlabrada	28,353	Spanish Socialist Workers' Party (PSOE)
Getafe	124,601	Spanish Socialist Workers' Party (PSOE)
Leganés	151,235	Spanish Socialist Workers' Party (PSOE)
**Madrid**	3,355,720	Spanish Socialist Workers' Party (PSOE)
Móstoles	101,266	Spanish Socialist Workers' Party (PSOE)
Parla	35,259	Spanish Socialist Workers' Party (PSOE)
Torrejón de Ardoz	54,702	Spanish Socialist Workers' Party (PSOE)

== Municipalities ==
=== Alcalá de Henares ===
Population: 110,102

Summary of the 3 April 1979 City Council of Alcalá de Henares election results →
Parties and alliances	Popular vote			Seats	
Parties and alliances	Votes	%	±pp	Total	+/−
Spanish Socialist Workers' Party (PSOE)	15,816	39.53	n/a	**12**	n/a
Union of the Democratic Centre (UCD)	9,381	23.45	n/a	**7**	n/a
Communist Party of Spain (PCE)	8,676	21.68	n/a	**6**	n/a
Workers' Revolutionary Organization (ORT)	3,783	9.45	n/a	**2**	n/a
Democratic Coalition (CD)	1,112	2.78	n/a	0	n/a
Communist Unification of Spain (UCE)	753	1.88	n/a	0	n/a
Spanish Phalanx of the CNSO (FE–JONS)	402	1.00	n/a	0	n/a
Revolutionary Communist League (LCR)	89	0.22	n/a	0	n/a
Blank ballots	0	0.00	n/a		
**Total**	**40,012**			**27**	**n/a**
Valid votes	40,012	100.00	n/a		
Invalid votes	0	0.00	n/a		
**Votes cast / turnout**	**40,012**	**57.94**	**n/a**		
Abstentions	29,043	42.06	n/a		
**Registered voters**	**69,055**				

=== Alcobendas ===
Population: 55,869

Summary of the 3 April 1979 City Council of Alcobendas election results →
Parties and alliances	Popular vote			Seats	
Parties and alliances	Votes	%	±pp	Total	+/−
Spanish Socialist Workers' Party (PSOE)	9,346	47.91	n/a	**13**	n/a
Communist Party of Spain (PCE)	4,294	22.01	n/a	**6**	n/a
Union of the Democratic Centre (UCD)	4,036	20.69	n/a	**5**	n/a
Independents (INDEP)	1,186	6.08	n/a	**1**	n/a
Workers' Revolutionary Organization (ORT)	645	3.31	n/a	0	n/a
Party of Labour of Spain (PTE)	0	0.00	n/a	0	n/a
Blank ballots	0	0.00	n/a		
**Total**	**19,507**			**25**	**n/a**
Valid votes	19,507	100.00	n/a		
Invalid votes	0	0.00	n/a		
**Votes cast / turnout**	**19,507**	**60.63**	**n/a**		
Abstentions	12,667	39.37	n/a		
**Registered voters**	**32,174**				

=== Alcorcón ===
Population: 119,300

Summary of the 3 April 1979 City Council of Alcorcón election results →
Parties and alliances	Popular vote			Seats	
Parties and alliances	Votes	%	±pp	Total	+/−
Spanish Socialist Workers' Party (PSOE)	20,624	47.05	n/a	**14**	n/a
Communist Party of Spain (PCE)	9,921	22.63	n/a	**7**	n/a
Union of the Democratic Centre (UCD)	8,976	20.48	n/a	**6**	n/a
Independent Group (AI)	1,979	4.51	n/a	0	n/a
Workers' Revolutionary Organization (ORT)	1,506	3.44	n/a	0	n/a
Democratic Coalition (CD)	829	1.89	n/a	0	n/a
Communist Movement–Organization of Communist Left (MC–OIC)	0	0.00	n/a	0	n/a
Blank ballots	0	0.00	n/a		
**Total**	**43,835**			**27**	**n/a**
Valid votes	43,835	100.00	n/a		
Invalid votes	0	0.00	n/a		
**Votes cast / turnout**	**43,835**	**58.47**	**n/a**		
Abstentions	31,137	41.53	n/a		
**Registered voters**	**74,972**				

=== Coslada ===
Population: 37,268

Summary of the 3 April 1979 City Council of Coslada election results →
Parties and alliances	Popular vote			Seats	
Parties and alliances	Votes	%	±pp	Total	+/−
Communist Party of Spain (PCE)	6,725	44.34	n/a	**9**	n/a
Spanish Socialist Workers' Party (PSOE)	5,345	35.24	n/a	**8**	n/a
Union of the Democratic Centre (UCD)	2,155	14.21	n/a	**3**	n/a
Workers' Revolutionary Organization (ORT)	941	6.20	n/a	**1**	n/a
Blank ballots	0	0.00	n/a		
**Total**	**15,166**			**21**	**n/a**
Valid votes	15,166	100.00	n/a		
Invalid votes	0	0.00	n/a		
**Votes cast / turnout**	**15,166**	**67.85**	**n/a**		
Abstentions	7,186	32.15	n/a		
**Registered voters**	**22,352**				

=== Fuenlabrada ===
Population: 28,353

Summary of the 3 April 1979 City Council of Fuenlabrada election results →
Parties and alliances	Popular vote			Seats	
Parties and alliances	Votes	%	±pp	Total	+/−
Spanish Socialist Workers' Party (PSOE)	3,696	38.91	n/a	**9**	n/a
Union of the Democratic Centre (UCD)	2,958	31.14	n/a	**7**	n/a
Communist Party of Spain (PCE)	1,658	17.45	n/a	**4**	n/a
Independents (INDEP)	584	6.15	n/a	**1**	n/a
Party of Labour of Spain (PTE)	366	3.85	n/a	0	n/a
New Force (FN)	209	2.20	n/a	0	n/a
Communist Movement–Organization of Communist Left (MC–OIC)	28	0.29	n/a	0	n/a
Blank ballots	0	0.00	n/a		
**Total**	**9,499**			**21**	**n/a**
Valid votes	9,499	100.00	n/a		
Invalid votes	0	0.00	n/a		
**Votes cast / turnout**	**9,499**	**57.98**	**n/a**		
Abstentions	6,884	42.02	n/a		
**Registered voters**	**16,383**				

=== Getafe ===
Population: 124,601

Summary of the 3 April 1979 City Council of Getafe election results →
Parties and alliances	Popular vote			Seats	
Parties and alliances	Votes	%	±pp	Total	+/−
Spanish Socialist Workers' Party (PSOE)	16,960	35.18	n/a	**10**	n/a
Communist Party of Spain (PCE)	16,833	34.92	n/a	**10**	n/a
Union of the Democratic Centre (UCD)	8,664	17.97	n/a	**5**	n/a
Workers' Revolutionary Organization (ORT)	3,763	7.81	n/a	**2**	n/a
Democratic Coalition (CD)	1,388	2.88	n/a	0	n/a
Communist Unification of Spain (UCE)	438	0.91	n/a	0	n/a
Communist Movement–Organization of Communist Left (MC–OIC)	162	0.34	n/a	0	n/a
Blank ballots	0	0.00	n/a		
**Total**	**48,208**			**27**	**n/a**
Valid votes	48,208	100.00	n/a		
Invalid votes	0	0.00	n/a		
**Votes cast / turnout**	**48,208**	**61.96**	**n/a**		
Abstentions	29,594	38.04	n/a		
**Registered voters**	**77,802**				

=== Leganés ===
Population: 151,235

Summary of the 3 April 1979 City Council of Leganés election results →
Parties and alliances	Popular vote			Seats	
Parties and alliances	Votes	%	±pp	Total	+/−
Spanish Socialist Workers' Party (PSOE)	28,924	49.41	n/a	**14**	n/a
Communist Party of Spain (PCE)	16,613	28.38	n/a	**8**	n/a
Union of the Democratic Centre (UCD)	8,930	15.25	n/a	**4**	n/a
Workers' Revolutionary Organization (ORT)	3,158	5.39	n/a	**1**	n/a
Democratic Coalition (CD)	671	1.15	n/a	0	n/a
Communist Movement–Organization of Communist Left (MC–OIC)	245	0.42	n/a	0	n/a
Blank ballots	0	0.00	n/a		
**Total**	**58,541**			**27**	**n/a**
Valid votes	58,541	100.00	n/a		
Invalid votes	0	0.00	n/a		
**Votes cast / turnout**	**58,541**	**62.33**	**n/a**		
Abstentions	35,382	37.67	n/a		
**Registered voters**	**93,923**				

=== Madrid ===
Population: 3,355,720

=== Móstoles ===
Population: 101,266

Summary of the 3 April 1979 City Council of Móstoles election results →
Parties and alliances	Popular vote			Seats	
Parties and alliances	Votes	%	±pp	Total	+/−
Spanish Socialist Workers' Party (PSOE)	12,980	41.52	n/a	**13**	n/a
Communist Party of Spain (PCE)	9,565	30.59	n/a	**10**	n/a
Union of the Democratic Centre (UCD)	4,229	13.53	n/a	**4**	n/a
Left Independent Citizen Candidacy (CCII)	1,407	4.50	n/a	0	n/a
Party of Labour of Spain (PTE)	890	2.85	n/a	0	n/a
Democratic Coalition (CD)	879	2.81	n/a	0	n/a
Independent Group (UIM)	682	2.18	n/a	0	n/a
New Force (FN)	417	1.33	n/a	0	n/a
Communist Movement–Organization of Communist Left (MC–OIC)	130	0.42	n/a	0	n/a
Revolutionary Communist League (LCR)	86	0.28	n/a	0	n/a
Blank ballots	0	0.00	n/a		
**Total**	**31,265**			**27**	**n/a**
Valid votes	31,265	100.00	n/a		
Invalid votes	0	0.00	n/a		
**Votes cast / turnout**	**31,265**	**54.20**	**n/a**		
Abstentions	26,422	45.80	n/a		
**Registered voters**	**57,687**				

=== Parla ===
Population: 35,259

Summary of the 3 April 1979 City Council of Parla election results →
Parties and alliances	Popular vote			Seats	
Parties and alliances	Votes	%	±pp	Total	+/−
Spanish Socialist Workers' Party (PSOE)	5,423	39.57	n/a	**9**	n/a
Communist Party of Spain (PCE)	5,013	36.58	n/a	**8**	n/a
Democratic Coalition (CD)	1,299	9.48	n/a	**2**	n/a
Union of the Democratic Centre (UCD)	1,005	7.33	n/a	**1**	n/a
Party of Labour of Spain (PTE)	721	5.26	n/a	**1**	n/a
Independent Electors' Group (AEI)	199	1.45	n/a	0	n/a
Communist Movement–Organization of Communist Left (MC–OIC)	46	0.34	n/a	0	n/a
Blank ballots	0	0.00	n/a		
**Total**	**13,706**			**21**	**n/a**
Valid votes	13,706	100.00	n/a		
Invalid votes	0	0.00	n/a		
**Votes cast / turnout**	**13,706**	**63.99**	**n/a**		
Abstentions	7,712	36.01	n/a		
**Registered voters**	**21,418**				

=== Torrejón de Ardoz ===
Population: 54,702

Summary of the 3 April 1979 City Council of Torrejón de Ardoz election results →
Parties and alliances	Popular vote			Seats	
Parties and alliances	Votes	%	±pp	Total	+/−
Spanish Socialist Workers' Party (PSOE)	8,761	44.21	n/a	**12**	n/a
Communist Party of Spain (PCE)	5,673	28.63	n/a	**7**	n/a
Union of the Democratic Centre (UCD)	2,907	14.67	n/a	**4**	n/a
Independent (INDEP)	1,536	7.75	n/a	**2**	n/a
Party of Labour of Spain (PTE)	711	3.59	n/a	0	n/a
Revolutionary Communist League (LCR)	227	1.15	n/a	0	n/a
Blank ballots	0	0.00	n/a		
**Total**	**19,815**			**25**	**n/a**
Valid votes	19,815	100.00	n/a		
Invalid votes	0	0.00	n/a		
**Votes cast / turnout**	**19,815**	**59.35**	**n/a**		
Abstentions	13,571	40.65	n/a		
**Registered voters**	**33,386**				
