= 1983 Madrilenian regional election =

Election in the Spanish region of Madrid

- 8 May 1983

All 94 seats in the Assembly of Madrid 48 seats needed for a majority
- Opinion polls
- Registered: 3,381,610
- Turnout: 2,356,925 (69.7%)
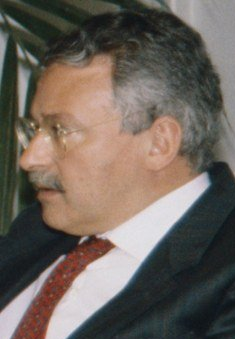

	First party	Second party	Third party
Leader	Joaquín Leguina	Luis Guillermo Perinat	Lorenzo Hernández
Party	PSOE	AP–PDP–PL	PCE
Leader since	14 December 1979	25 January 1983	1983
Seats won	51	34	9
Popular vote	1,181,277	798,353	207,058
Percentage	50.5%	34.1%	8.8%
President after election
Joaquín Leguina
PSOE

A regional election was held in the Community of Madrid on 8 May 1983 to elect the 1st Assembly of the autonomous community. All 94 seats in the Assembly were up for election. It was held concurrently with regional elections in twelve other autonomous communities and local elections all across Spain.

The election resulted in a landslide victory for the Spanish Socialist Workers' Party (PSOE), the only time to date the party has achieved this in a Madrilenian regional election. The People's Coalition, an electoral alliance formed by the People's Alliance (AP), the People's Democratic Party (PDP) and the Liberal Union (UL), emerged as the second largest group in the Assembly, whereas the Communist Party of Spain (PCE) improved on its 1982 results in the region and secured 9 seats with 8.8% of the vote. The result ensured Socialist Joaquín Leguina would become the first President of the Community of Madrid, though the PSOE showed a willingness in collaborating with the PCE.

== Overview ==
Under the 1983 Statute of Autonomy, the Assembly of Madrid was the unicameral legislature of the homonymous autonomous community, having legislative power in devolved matters, as well as the ability to grant or withdraw confidence from a regional president. The electoral and procedural rules were supplemented by national law provisions.

=== Date ===
The Government of Spain was required to call an election to the Assembly before 31 May 1983.

The Assembly of Madrid could not be dissolved before the expiration date of parliament, except in the event of an investiture process failing to elect a regional president within a two-month period from the first ballot. In such a case, the Assembly was to be automatically dissolved and a snap election called, with elected lawmakers serving the remainder of its original four-year term.

On 7 March 1983, it was confirmed that the first Assembly election would be held on 8 May, together with regional elections for twelve other autonomous communities as well as the regularly scheduled nationwide local elections. The election to the Assembly of Madrid was officially called on 10 March 1983 with the publication of the corresponding decree in the Official State Gazette, setting election day for 8 May.

=== Electoral system ===
Voting for the Assembly was based on universal suffrage, comprising all Spanish nationals over 18 years of age, registered in the Community of Madrid and with full political rights.

The Assembly of Madrid had one seat per 50,000 inhabitants or fraction above 25,000. All were elected in a single multi-member constituency—corresponding to the autonomous community's territory—using the D'Hondt method and closed-list proportional voting, with a five percent-threshold of valid votes (including blank ballots) regionally. As a result of the aforementioned allocation, the Assembly was entitled to 94 seats, based on the official population figures resulting from the latest revision of the municipal register (as of 1 March 1981).

The law did not provide for by-elections to fill vacant seats; instead, any vacancies arising after the proclamation of candidates and during the legislative term were filled by the next candidates on the party lists or, when required, by designated substitutes.

== Opinion polls ==
The tables below list opinion polling results in reverse chronological order, showing the most recent first and using the dates when the survey fieldwork was done, as opposed to the date of publication. Where the fieldwork dates are unknown, the date of publication is given instead. The highest percentage figure in each polling survey is displayed with its background shaded in the leading party's colour. If a tie ensues, this is applied to the figures with the highest percentages. The "Lead" column on the right shows the percentage-point difference between the parties with the highest percentages in a poll.

=== Voting intention estimates ===
The table below lists weighted voting intention estimates. Refusals are generally excluded from the party vote percentages, while question wording and the treatment of "don't know" responses and those not intending to vote may vary between polling organisations. When available, seat projections determined by the polling organisations are displayed below (or in place of) the percentages in a smaller font; 48 seats were required for an absolute majority in the Assembly of Madrid.

Polling firm/Commissioner	Fieldwork date	Sample size	Turnout	PSOE	AP–PDP–UL	PCE	CDS	PDL	Lead
1983 regional election	8 May 1983	—N/a	69.7	50.5; 51	34.1; 34	8.8; 9	3.1; 0	1.9; 0	16.4
Gallup/PDL	25–26 Apr 1983	1,000	87.7	45.4	27.3	8.2	0.3	5.9	18.1
Sofemasa/El País	23–26 Apr 1983	?	72.9	58.6; 61/67	20.6; 20/24	7.7; 6/9	3.1; 0	0.6; 0	38.0
1982 general election	28 Oct 1982	—N/a	86.0	52.1 (58)	32.3 (36)	5.0 (0)	4.1 (0)	–	19.8

== Results ==
=== Overall ===
Summary of the 8 May 1983 Assembly of Madrid election results →
Parties and alliances	Popular vote			Seats	
Parties and alliances	Votes	%	±pp	Total	+/−
Spanish Socialist Workers' Party (PSOE)	1,181,277	50.48	n/a	51	n/a
People's Coalition (AP–PDP–UL)	798,353	34.12	n/a	34	n/a
Communist Party of Spain (PCE)	207,058	8.85	n/a	9	n/a
Democratic and Social Centre (CDS)	73,124	3.12	n/a	0	n/a
Liberal Democratic Party (PDL)	43,309	1.85	n/a	0	n/a
Independent Electors' Action (ADEI)	10,327	0.44	n/a	0	n/a
Communist League–Workers' Agreement (LC–AO)	6,301	0.27	n/a	0	n/a
Spanish Communist Workers' Party (PCOE)	4,473	0.19	n/a	0	n/a
Popular Struggle Coalition (CLP)	2,168	0.09	n/a	0	n/a
Blank ballots	13,735	0.59	n/a		
Total	2,340,125			94	n/a
Valid votes	2,340,125	99.29	n/a		
Invalid votes	16,800	0.71	n/a		
Votes cast / turnout	2,356,925	69.70	n/a		
Abstentions	1,024,685	30.30	n/a		
Registered voters	3,381,610				

Popular vote
PSOE	50.48%
AP–PDP–UL	34.12%
PCE	8.85%
CDS	3.12%
PDL	1.85%
Others	0.99%
Blank ballots	0.59%

Seats
PSOE	54.26%
AP–PDP–UL	36.17%
PCE	9.57%

=== Elected legislators ===
The following table lists the elected legislators sorted by order of election.

Elected legislators
#	Name	List
1	Joaquín Leguina Herrán	PSOE
2	Luis Guillermo Perinat y Elío	AP–PDP–UL
3	César Cimadevilla Costa ^{(es)}	PSOE
4	Carlos Robles Piquer	AP–PDP–UL
5	María Gómez Mendoza	PSOE
6	Ramón Espinar Gallego	PSOE
7	Isaac Sáez González	AP–PDP–UL
8	Manuel de la Rocha Rubí	PSOE
9	Lorenzo Hernández Jiménez	PCE
10	Luis María Huete Morillo ^{(es)}	AP–PDP–UL
11	Francisca Sauquillo Pérez del Arco	PSOE
12	Virgilio Cano de Lope ^{(es)}	PSOE
13	Antonio Fernández-Galiano Fernández	AP–PDP–UL
14	Agapito Ramos Cuenca ^{(es)}	PSOE
15	Gabriel Usera González	AP–PDP–UL
16	Benjamín Castro Yuste	PSOE
17	Luis Maestre Muñiz	PSOE
18	Carlos Argós García	AP–PDP–UL
19	Sócrates Gómez Pérez ^{(es)}	PSOE
20	Manuel Rico Rego ^{(es)}	PCE
21	José Ramón Pin Arboledas	AP–PDP–UL
22	Bartolomé González Llorente	PSOE
23	Francisco González Fernández	PSOE
24	Eurico de la Peña Díaz	AP–PDP–UL
25	María Elena Flores Valencia	PSOE
26	María Antonia Suárez Cuesta	AP–PDP–UL
27	Elvira Domingo Ortiz	PSOE
28	José Luis García Alonso	PSOE
29	Cándida O'Shea Suárez Inclán	AP–PDP–UL
30	José Emilio Sánchez Cuenca	PSOE
31	Emilio Ramón Rodríguez Sánchez	PCE
32	José López López	AP–PDP–UL
33	Marcos Sanz Agüero ^{(es)}	PSOE
34	Miguel Peydro Caro	PSOE
35	Vicente Blanco Gaspar	AP–PDP–UL
36	Dolores García-Hierro Caraballo	PSOE
37	Enrique Castellanos Colomo ^{(es)}	AP–PDP–UL
38	Juan José Layda Ferrer	PSOE
39	Francisco Javier Ledesma Bartret	PSOE
40	Antonio Germán Beteta Barreda ^{(es)}	AP–PDP–UL
41	Manuel Corvo González	PCE
42	José Ramón García Menéndez	PSOE
43	Juan Antonio Cánovas del Castillo	AP–PDP–UL
44	Saturnino Ureña Fernández	PSOE
45	Isidro Florencio Campos Corona	PSOE
46	José María Federico Corral	AP–PDP–UL
47	Henar Corbi Murgui	PSOE
48	José Manuel Pérez Vázquez	AP–PDP–UL
49	Benito Reino Torres	PSOE
50	Francisco Cábaco López	PSOE
51	Felipe Ruiz Duerto	AP–PDP–UL
52	Carmen Roney Albareda	PCE
53	Eulalia García Sánchez	PSOE
54	Elías Cruz Atienza	AP–PDP–UL
55	Ángel Ramón Martínez Marín	PSOE
56	Luis Alejandro Cendrero Uceda ^{(es)}	PSOE
57	Alfredo Rodrigo de Santiago	AP–PDP–UL
58	Jesús Pérez González	PSOE
59	Eduardo Rodríguez-Losada Aguado	AP–PDP–UL
60	Félix Sevilla García	PSOE
61	Carlos Díaz-Guerra Esteban	AP–PDP–UL
62	José Luis Adell Fernández ^{(d)}	PSOE
63	José Luis Casas Nombela	PCE
64	Rafael Ramos Gámez	PSOE
65	Pilar Bidagor Antuna	AP–PDP–UL
66	Francisco Javier Vicén Sanagustín	PSOE
67	Ana María García Armendáriz	AP–PDP–UL
68	Antonio José Rojo Sastre	PSOE
69	Jaime Lissavetzky Díez	PSOE
70	Hermann Oehling Ruiz ^{(es)}	AP–PDP–UL
71	Carlos Pérez Díaz	PSOE
72	Antonio Gutiérrez Araújo	PCE
73	José Gil de la Viña	AP–PDP–UL
74	Matías Castejón Núñez	PSOE
75	Timoteo Mayoral Marqués	PSOE
76	José Luis Hidalgo Utesa	AP–PDP–UL
77	Jesús Santisteban Sáez	PSOE
78	Leopoldo Gómez Gutiérrez	AP–PDP–UL
79	José Antonio Sainz García	PSOE
80	Alfonso Sacristán Alonso	PSOE
81	Juan Antonio Gómez-Angulo Rodríguez ^{(es)}	AP–PDP–UL
82	Máximo Alonso Arranz	PSOE
83	Sergio García Reyes	PCE
84	Pedro Núñez Morgades ^{(es)}	AP–PDP–UL
85	José Lucas Reguilón Alvarez	PSOE
86	Esteban Egea Sánchez	PSOE
87	Mariano de la Cuerda Rodríguez	AP–PDP–UL
88	Adolfo Martínez Sánchez	PSOE
89	José Luis Ortiz Estévez	AP–PDP–UL
90	Luis Alonso Castaño	PSOE
91	José Luis Torner Martínez	PSOE
92	José Antonio López Casas	AP–PDP–UL
93	Juan Sánchez Fernández	PSOE
94	Juan Francisco Moreno Preciados	PCE

== Aftermath ==
=== Government formation ===
Investiture; Nomination of Joaquín Leguina (PSOE)
Ballot →	14 June 1983
Required majority →	48 out of 94
Yes: • PSOE (51)	51 / 94
No: • AP–PDP–UL (33)	33 / 94
Abstentions: • PCE (8)	8 / 94
Absentees: • AP–PDP–UL (1); • PCE (1)	2 / 94

== Bibliography ==
- Real Decreto-ley 20/1977, de 18 de marzo, sobre Normas Electorales (Royal Decree-Law 20/1977). Official State Gazette (in Spanish). 18 March 1977. BOE-A-1977-7445.
- Ley Orgánica 3/1983, de 25 de febrero, de Estatuto de Autonomía de la Comunidad de Madrid (Organic Law 3/1983). Official State Gazette (in Spanish). 25 February 1983 [version as of 1 March 1983]. BOE-A-1983-6317.
- Real Decreto 450/1983, de 9 de marzo, de convocatoria de elecciones a la Asamblea de la Comunidad Autónoma de Madrid (PDF) (Royal Decree 450/1983). Official State Gazette (in Spanish). 9 March 1983. BOE-A-1983-7298.
