= Manuel de la Rocha =

Manuel de la Rocha may refer to:

- Manuel de la Rocha Rubí (born 1947), Spanish politician, member of the Spanish Socialist Workers' Party.
- Manuel de la Rocha, alias Empath, fictional mutant of Marvel Comics.
