= Teófilo Serrano =

Spanish politician (1950–2024)

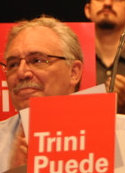
- Serrano in 2010

Senator
- In office 16 July 1991 – 3 May 1994

Member of the Assembly of Madrid
- In office 26 May 1991 – 3 May 1994

Personal details
- Born: 28 July 1950; Tudela, Spain
- Died: 3 August 2024 (aged 74); Tudela, Spain
- Citizenship: Spanish
- Political party: PSOE
- Occupation: Engineer, civil servant, politician

José Teófilo Serrano Beltrán (28 July 1950 – 3 August 2024) was a Spanish politician, civil servant and engineer who was a member of the Spanish Socialist Workers' Party (PSOE).

== Biography ==
Born in 1950 in Tudela, Navarre, he obtained a degree in Road, Channel and Port Engineering and became a civil servant.

He joined the Spanish Socialist Workers' Party (PSOE) in 1976. He served as Secretary of State of Public Administration during the González Governments between 1986 and 1991, when he replaced Joaquín Leguina as Secretary-General of the Madrilenian Socialist Federation (FSM). In the context of the internecine strifes within the FSM, Serrano, despite actually having been proposed to the post by the guerristas, distanced himself from the guerrista chief José Acosta, and had to endure tensions coming from the guerrista camp, having been ultimately identified as a member of the renovadores in the FSM.

He ran 2nd in the PSOE list for the 1991 Madrilenian regional election, and became a member of the 3rd term of the Assembly of Madrid. He also became a Senator, designated by the regional legislature. Tired of the continuous infighting in the FSM, Serrano gave up in 1994. He was replaced as Secretary-General of the organization by the renovador Jaime Lissavetzky. He also resigned to his seat in the regional legislature.

Following his exit from Madrilenian politics, he served as Director-General of the Instituto Geográfico Nacional. He later worked as managing director for Urban Transport of Seville (Tussam) and as CEO and director for Infrastructure Management of Andalusia (GIASA). Counselor of Labor and Immigration in the Spanish Embassy to the United Kingdom, Serrano was appointed by the Council of Ministers as President of Renfe in May 2009. He left the post in late 2011 with the change of government, as Mariano Rajoy became prime minister.

Serrano died in Tudela on 3 August 2024, at the age of 74.

Party political offices
Preceded by Joaquín Leguina	Secretary General of the Madrilenian Socialist Federation; 1991–1994	Next: Jaime Lissavetzky
Business positions
Preceded by José Salgueiro	Chairman of Renfe Operadora; 2009–2011	Next: Julio Gómez-Pomar
