= Manuel de la Rocha Rubí =

Spanish politician

Manuel de la Rocha
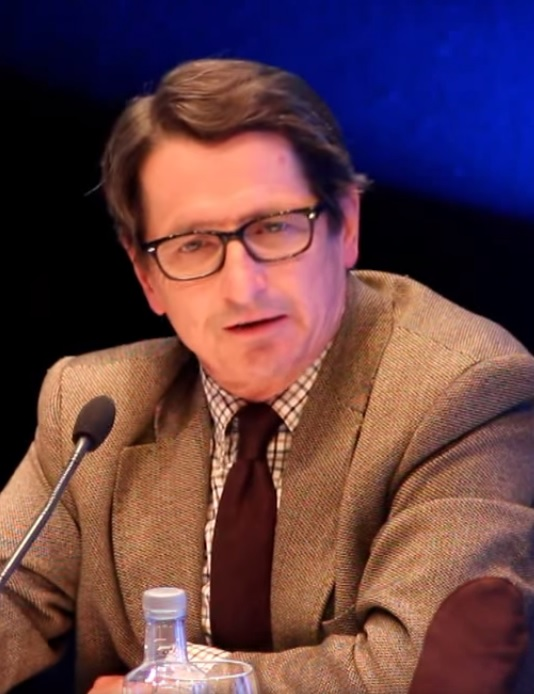
- In 2015

Mayor of Fuenlabrada
- In office 19 April 1979 – 1983

Minister of Education and Youth of the Community of Madrid
- In office 1983 – September 1985

Member of the Assembly of Madrid
- In office 1983–1991

Member of the Congress of Deputies
- In office 22 June 1993 – 9 January 1996
- Constituency: Madrid
- In office 24 March 2008 – 27 September 2011
- Constituency: Madrid
- In office 8 July 2014 – 27 October 2015
- Constituency: Madrid

Personal details
- Born: 18 December 1947 (age 77); Madrid, Spanish State
- Citizenship: Spanish
- Political party: PSOE (since 1972)
- Children: Manuel de la Rocha Vázquez
- Occupation: Politician, lawyer, trade unionist, professor

Manuel de la Rocha Rubí (born 1947) is a Spanish politician of the Spanish Socialist Workers' Party (PSOE). A member of the 1st and 2nd terms of the Assembly of Madrid as well as of the 5th, 9th and 10th Congress of Deputies, he has served as Mayor of Fuenlabrada from 1979 to 1983 and as Minister of Education and Youth of the Community of Madrid from 1983 to 1985.

== Biography ==
Born on 18 December 1947 in Madrid, he graduated in Law. Linked to Christian movements and organizations, he affiliated to the then clandestine PSOE and Unión General de Trabajadores (UGT) in 1972.

A professor of law in the Complutense University of Madrid, he left the post to run in the 1979 municipal election in Fuenlabrada. Following the PSOE victory in the election, he became mayor of the municipality on 19 April 1983. He worked part-time as lawyer to maintain income. He simultaneously ran as candidate both in the 1983 regional election and in the 1983 Fuenlabrada municipal election, successfully becoming member of the 1st Assembly of Madrid. Invested again as Mayor of Fuenlabrada, soon after being sworn to office for a second spell he handed in his resignation in order to become Minister of Education and Youth of the first government of the community of Madrid, presided by Joaquín Leguina. He renounced as regional minister in September 1985, criticising the regional and economic policy of the Central Government, and was replaced by Jaime Lissavetzky.

Running 7th in the PSOE for the 1987 Madrilenian regional election, he renovated his seat in the regional legislature. Following the 1993 general election he became a member of the Congress of Deputies for its 5th term (1993–1996).

A leading figure of the critic faction Izquierda Socialista, he returned to Congress in March 2008, following the 2008 Spanish general election. He was one of the members (along José Antonio Pérez Tapias and Juan Antonio Barrio de Penagos) of the Socialist Parliamentary Group in the Congress who decided not to take part in the September 2011 voting for the reform of the Spanish Constitution struck by the PSOE and the People's Party that sought to include (and successfully did so) the principle of "budgetary stability" in the Article 135 of the text.

He ran again as candidate to the lower house in the November 2011 general election, although he was not elected legislator then. Nonetheless, de la Rocha became later a member of the 10th Congress of Deputies in July 2014, replacing the vacant seat of Elena Valenciano, elected to the European Parliament.

De la Rocha, who was serving as secretary in the board of trustees of the Fundación Alternativas, announced his intentions to run in the PSOE primaries to select the party challenger to the post of Mayor of Madrid in October 2018.

== Decorations ==
- Grand Cross of the Orden of St. Raymond of Peñafort (1996)

Political offices
| Preceded by Juan Francisco Lorenzo Mendoza | Mayor of Fuenlabrada; 1979–1983 | Succeeded by José Quintana Viar |
| New creation | Minister of Education and Youth of the Community of Madrid; 1983–1985 | Succeeded by Jaime Lissavetzky |
