= Alonso Puerta =

Spanish politician

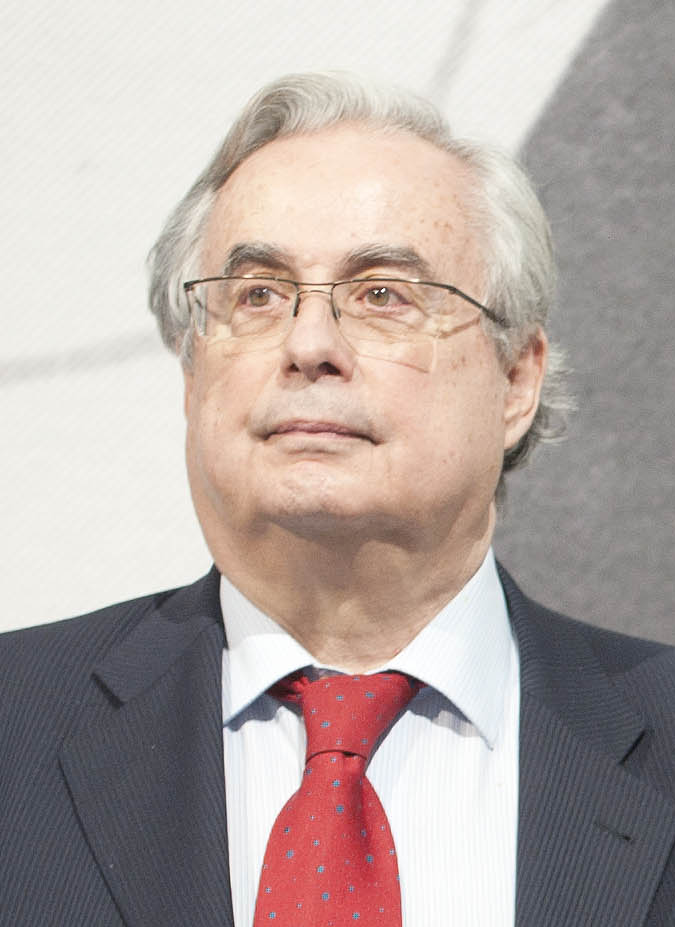
Alonso Puerta, at the exhibition 'Indalecio Prieto in Basque politics, 1883–1962' (2012).

Alonso José Puerta Gutiérrez (born 1944) is a Spanish politician.

Born on 24 March 1944 in Avilés, Asturias. Puerta was initially a Spanish Socialist Workers' Party (PSOE) member and was elected for that party to the Spanish Congress of Deputies at the 1977 general election representing Madrid. He was the leader of the Madrid regional branch of the party, the Madrilenian Socialist Federation, from 1977 to 1979. Puerta ran as candidate in the PSOE list for the 1979 Madrid City Council election and, elected, he served as municipal councillor from 19 April 1979 to 9 October 1981. He left the party and joined United Left. He was a member of the European Parliament from 1987 to 2004.

Party political offices
Preceded by	Secretary-General of the Madrilenian Socialist Federation; 1977–1979	Succeeded by Joaquín Leguina
