= Paquita Sauquillo =

Spanish lawyer and politician

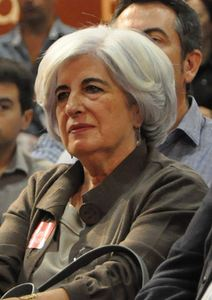
- April 2010

Member of the European Parliament
- In office 1994–2004
- Constituency: Spain

Deputy of the Assembly of Madrid
- In office 1983–1994

Senator of the Cortes Generales
- In office 1983–1994
- Constituency: by designation of the Assembly of Madrid

Personal details
- Born: Francisca Sauquillo Pérez del Arco; 31 July 1943 (age 83) Madrid, Spain
- Party: ORT; PSOE (1987–present)
- Spouse: Jacobo Echeverría-Torres Tovar
- Relatives: Francisco Javier Sauquillo (brother)
- Education: Complutense University of Madrid
- Occupation: Lawyer, politician
- Awards: Great Cross of the Civil Order of Social Solidarity (2010)

Francisca "Paquita" Sauquillo Pérez del Arco (born 31 July 1943) is a Spanish lawyer and politician known for her activism as a labor lawyer and in defense of democratic liberties during the dictatorship of Francisco Franco. She has been a deputy of the Assembly of Madrid (1983–1994), a Senator (1983–1994) and a member of the European Parliament (1994–2004). Since 1985, she has been president of the NGO Movement for Peace, Disarmament, and Freedom (MPDL). Since May 2016, she has presided as Commissioner of Historical Memory of the City Council of Madrid.

== Biography ==
Paquita Sauquillo was born in Madrid on 31 July 1943, the eldest daughter of José Luis Sauquillo and Deseada Pérez del Arco. She had two brothers, José Luis (born 1944), and Javier (born 1947), also a lawyer, who was murdered on 24 January 1977 during the Atocha massacre. Paquita could also have died that night, but she was meeting with the lawyers José María Mohedano and Manuela Carmena at another location.

She was linked to Christian movements during the later stages of Francoism. Beginning in 1965 she worked in the group of Father Llanos in El Pozo del Tío Raimundo, actively involved as a labor lawyer in the movements that led to the creation of the first neighborhood associations in Entrevías.

Sauquillo has been a lawyer since 1966. She has worked as a criminal attorney on numerous national issues before the Spanish Provincial Courts, in addition to serving in the Audiencia Nacional, and in the Supreme Court and Constitutional Court. She created one of the first labor law firms in Madrid, known as the "Despacho de Lista", in 1970, where she defended trade unionists from the Pegaso, Standard Eléctrica, Marconi, etc. factories during that decade. A plaintiff's attorney in various popular actions, she worked for the defense of fundamental rights, defended students, workers, politicians, and members of unions before the Public Order Court (TOP).

With the arrival of democracy, she acted in civil and family matters. The first book that she published was on divorce law claims. Beginning in 1981, she advised and defended more than 3,000 people affected by the toxic syndrome caused by colza oil, attending all judicial proceedings. This ruling established jurisprudence on crimes against public health.

== Political career ==
In the late 1960s, Sauquillo joined the clandestine union Acción Sindical de Trabajadores (AST), one of the groups that would give rise, in 1969, to the Workers' Revolutionary Organization (ORT), and would later assume Maoist ideology. She remained a member for fourteen years. In 1979 she was head of list of the joint candidacy of the ORT and the Party of Labour (PTE) (called Candidature of the Workers) for the mayoralty of Madrid, without being able to obtain the office of councilor. Later she allied herself with the Spanish Socialist Workers' Party (PSOE) and was integrated as an independent candidate for the party in the first elections to the Assembly of Madrid in 1983, being elected to the 1st legislature, and continuing to hold the seat in the 2nd and 3rd legislatures. In 1987 she joined the PSOE.

As an autonomous parliamentarian, she was appointed Senator by the Madrid Assembly in 1983, occupying a seat in the Upper House in the 2nd, 3rd, 4th, and 5th legislatures of the Cortes Generales, until 1994. As a senator she was a member of the Justice Commission and rapporteur of the Organic Law of the Judiciary. She also served as a member of the European Parliament (MEP) from 1994 to 2004 for the PSOE. She remained in the Assembly of Madrid until the same year. On that date, she resigned her seats in the Madrid and Spanish legislatures when she was elected MEP. She remained in the European Parliament until 2004. She was part of the Federal Executive Commission of the PSOE from 1994 to 2000. Since 1985, she has been president of the Movement for Peace, Disarmament, and Freedom.

From 2005 to 2013, she was president of the Council of Consumers and Users of Spain. She is vice president of the Volunteering Platform of Spain and a member of the Platform of the Third Sector.

Since May 2016, Sauquillo has presided over the Commission of Historical Memory of the City Council of Madrid appointed by mayor Manuela Carmena.

== Personal life ==
On 16 July 1969, Sauquillo married the lawyer and activist Jacobo Echeverría-Torres Tovar (1942–2005) in the CSIC chapel in Madrid. They had two children, Javier (born 1978) and Jacobo (born 1980). On 7 April 1998 Javier, who suffered from anorexia nervosa, suffered a hypoglycemic shock in the Madrid Metro that plunged him into a state of semiconsciousness. Unable to move or speak, he was treated at first in the station's lobby and later was evicted by two guards at the request of the chief of security. The guards confused Javier for a "terminal AIDS patient", and he remained "thrown" for more than an hour in the mouth of the Metro station without any onlookers calling the S.A.M.U.R., said Francisca Sauquillo during the trial against the guards held in January 2002. Finally, the call came at about 1:30, but there was little the health workers could do. Javier went into a coma and died at 6:00 am at the Hospital de La Princesa. In February 2002, the Audiencia of Madrid sentenced the Metro's security chief and two Prosesa guards for failure to provide assistance, and ordered the Metro and Prosesa to compensate the family with 42,070 euros.

== Awards and recognitions ==
- European Women's Award at the 1993 European Union of Federalists and Women of the European Movement
- 2006 Silver Rose Award in Brussels
- 2008 Spanish Citizens' Award
- 2009 European Citizens' Prize
- Medal of Honor of the Bar Association for her dedication to the world of law on 23 October 2009
- 2009 Lawyers of Atocha Award instituted by the Regional Government of Castile-La Mancha
- Great Cross of the Civil Order of Social Solidarity on 24 May 2010
- 2015 Human Rights Award granted by the General Council of Spanish Law
- 2016 2nd Luis Cabrejas Freedom Award
- 2026 Grand Cross of the Order of Saint Raymond of Peñafort
