= 1991 Madrilenian regional election =

Election in the Spanish region of Madrid

- 26 May 1991

All 101 seats in the Assembly of Madrid 51 seats needed for a majority
- Opinion polls
- Registered: 3,837,680 ▲9.2%
- Turnout: 2,251,613 (58.7%) ▼11.2 pp
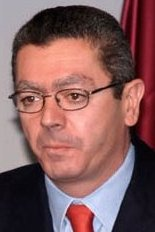

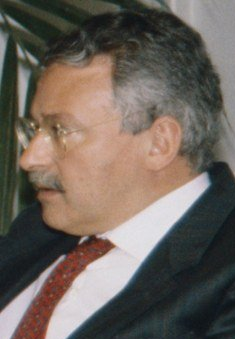

	First party	Second party	Third party
Leader	Alberto Ruiz-Gallardón	Joaquín Leguina	Isabel Villalonga
Party	PP	PSOE	IU
Leader since	8 February 1987	14 December 1979	1987
Last election	32 seats, 31.8% (Note: Results for AP (31.4%, 32 seats) and PDP (0.4%, 0 seats) in the 1987 election.)	40 seats, 38.4%	7 seats, 7.5%
Seats won	47	41	13
Seat change	▲15	▲1	▲6
Popular vote	956,865	820,510	270,558
Percentage	42.7%	36.6%	12.1%
Swing	▲10.9 pp	▼1.8 pp	▲4.6 pp
President before election
Joaquín Leguina
PSOE
President after election
Joaquín Leguina
PSOE

A regional election was held in the Community of Madrid on 26 May 1991 to elect the 3rd Assembly of the autonomous community. All 101 seats in the Assembly were up for election. It was held concurrently with regional elections in twelve other autonomous communities and local elections all across Spain.

The election saw the electoral collapse of the Democratic and Social Centre (CDS), which fell below the 5% threshold and lost all their 17 seats. Alberto Ruiz-Gallardón's People's Party (PP) emerged as the largest party in the community for the first time, but was unable to form a government due to the lack of allies as a result of CDS expulsion from the Assembly. Consequently, Joaquín Leguina from the Spanish Socialist Workers' Party (PSOE) was re-elected President for a third term in office thanks to the support of United Left (IU).

== Background ==
The 1987 election had resulted in a parliamentary deadlock. The opposition bloc of the People's Alliance (AP) and the CDS held 49 seats against 47 for the PSOE and IU. The ruling PSOE was initially able to hold on to power and have Joaquín Leguina re-elected President thanks to CDS' abstention, but nonetheless the government's majority remained precarious.

In 1988, an AP deputy, Nicolás Piñeiro Cuesta, resigned from the party as a result of ideological differences with the Madrid AP leader, Alberto Ruiz-Gallardón. Piñeiro launched his own party, the Independent Madrilenian Regional Party (PRIM), shortly after. Thereafter, in January 1989, AP along with other parties merged into the newly created People's Party (PP).

In the first half of 1989, the PP and the CDS reached an agreement of cooperation in the Madrid Assembly, resulting in a motion of no confidence against Leguina's government in June 1989, in an attempt to replace it with a PP-CDS administration headed by Ruiz-Gallardón as Madrid President. To succeed, the motion needed the support of a majority of members, meaning that 49 votes were needed. With the PP and CDS having 48 members, Piñeiro's support was necessary. However, he abstained, and the United Left members blocked the motion alongside PSOE, resulting in the vote failing.

== Overview ==
Under the 1983 Statute of Autonomy, the Assembly of Madrid was the unicameral legislature of the homonymous autonomous community, having legislative power in devolved matters, as well as the ability to grant or withdraw confidence from a regional president. The electoral and procedural rules were supplemented by national law provisions.

=== Date ===
The term of the Assembly of Madrid expired four years after the date of its previous ordinary election, with election day being fixed for the fourth Sunday of May every four years. The election decree was required to be issued between 54 and 60 days before the scheduled election date and published on the following day in the Official Gazette of the Community of Madrid (BOCM). The previous election was held on 10 June 1987, setting the date for election day on the fourth Sunday of May four years later, which was 26 May 1991.

Amendments in 1990 granted the regional president the prerogative to dissolve the Assembly of Madrid at any given time and call a snap election, provided that no motion of no confidence was in process, no nationwide election had been called and that dissolution did not occur either during the first legislative session or during the last year of parliament before its planned expiration, nor before one year after a previous one. In the event of an investiture process failing to elect a regional president within a two-month period from the first ballot, the Assembly was to be automatically dissolved and a fresh election called. Any snap election held as a result of these circumstances did not alter the date of the chamber's next ordinary election, with elected lawmakers serving the remainder of its original four-year term.

The election to the Assembly of Madrid was officially called on 2 April 1991 with the publication of the corresponding decree in the BOCM, setting election day for 26 May and scheduling for the chamber to reconvene on 19 June.

=== Electoral system ===
Voting for the Assembly was based on universal suffrage, comprising all Spanish nationals over 18 years of age, registered in the Community of Madrid and with full political rights, provided that they had not been deprived of the right to vote by a final sentence, nor were legally incapacitated.

The Assembly of Madrid had one seat per 50,000 inhabitants or fraction above 25,000. All were elected in a single multi-member constituency—corresponding to the autonomous community's territory—using the D'Hondt method and closed-list proportional voting, with a five percent-threshold of valid votes (including blank ballots) regionally. As a result of the aforementioned allocation, the Assembly was entitled to 101 seats, based on the official population figures resulting from the latest revision of the municipal register (as of 1 January 1990).

The law did not provide for by-elections to fill vacant seats; instead, any vacancies arising after the proclamation of candidates and during the legislative term were filled by the next candidates on the party lists or, when required, by designated substitutes.

=== Outgoing parliament ===
The table below shows the composition of the parliamentary groups in the chamber at the time of the election call.

Parliamentary composition in April 1991
Groups	Parties	Legislators	
Groups	Parties	Seats	Total
Socialist Parliamentary Group	PSOE	40	40
People's Parliamentary Group	PP	30	30
Democratic and Social Centre's Parliamentary Group	CDS	13	13
United Left Parliamentary Group	IU	7	7
Mixed Parliamentary Group	INDEP	4 (Note: Jesús Arilla, Juan José Arnela, Abel Cádiz and Fernando Lanzaco, former CDS legislators.)	6
Mixed Parliamentary Group	PRIM	2 (Note: Nicolás Piñeiro and José Luis Ortiz, former AP legislators.)	6

== Parties and candidates ==
The electoral law allowed for parties and federations registered in the interior ministry, alliances and groupings of electors to present lists of candidates. Parties and federations intending to form an alliance were required to inform the relevant electoral commission within 10 days of the election call, whereas groupings of electors needed to secure the signature of at least 0.5 percent of the electorate in the Community of Madrid, disallowing electors from signing for more than one list.

Below is a list of the main parties and alliances which contested the election:

Candidacy	Parties and alliances	Leading candidate	Ideology	Previous result		Gov.	Ref.
Candidacy	Parties and alliances	Leading candidate	Ideology	Vote %	Seats	Gov.	Ref.
PSOE	List: Spanish Socialist Workers' Party (PSOE)	Joaquín Leguina	Social democracy	38.4%	40	Yes	
PP	List: People's Party (PP)	Alberto Ruiz-Gallardón	Conservatism; Christian democracy	31.8%	32	No	
CDS	List: Democratic and Social Centre (CDS)	José Ramón Lasuén	Centrism; Liberalism	16.6%	17	No	
IU	List: United Left (IU)	Isabel Villalonga	Socialism; Communism	7.5%	7	No	

== Opinion polls ==
The tables below list opinion polling results in reverse chronological order, showing the most recent first and using the dates when the survey fieldwork was done, as opposed to the date of publication. Where the fieldwork dates are unknown, the date of publication is given instead. The highest percentage figure in each polling survey is displayed with its background shaded in the leading party's colour. If a tie ensues, this is applied to the figures with the highest percentages. The "Lead" column on the right shows the percentage-point difference between the parties with the highest percentages in a poll.

=== Voting intention estimates ===
The table below lists weighted voting intention estimates. Refusals are generally excluded from the party vote percentages, while question wording and the treatment of "don't know" responses and those not intending to vote may vary between polling organisations. When available, seat projections determined by the polling organisations are displayed below (or in place of) the percentages in a smaller font; 51 seats were required for an absolute majority in the Assembly of Madrid (49 in the 1987 election).

Polling firm/Commissioner	Fieldwork date	Sample size	Turnout	PSOE	AP	CDS	IU	LV	PDP	PP	ARM	Lead
1991 regional election	26 May 1991	—N/a	58.7	36.6; 41	(Note: Within PP.)	3.3; 0	12.1; 13	1.6; 0		42.7; 47	–	6.1
Sigma Dos/El Mundo	18 May 1991	?	?	32.3; 35/36		5.4; 6	14.6; 16	3.4; 0		39.7; 44/45	–	7.4
Metra Seis/El Independiente	12 May 1991	?	?	36.2; 39		8.7; 9	10.5; 11	4.2; 4		35.1; 38	–	1.1
Demoscopia/El País	4–7 May 1991	800	?	36.4; 42/43		4.5; 0	11.7; 13	4.3; 0		38.9; 45/46	–	2.5
1989 general election	29 Oct 1989	—N/a	72.7	33.5 (36)		11.0 (12)	15.4 (16)	1.1 (0)		34.2 (37)	1.0 (0)	0.7
1989 EP election	15 Jun 1989	—N/a	58.5	35.5 (41)		9.3 (11)	8.4 (9)	1.8 (0)		28.0 (33)	6.1 (7)	7.5
1987 regional election	10 Jun 1987	—N/a	69.9	38.4; 40	31.4; 32	16.6; 17	7.5; 7	1.1; 0	0.4; 0	–	–	7.0

== Results ==
← Summary of the 26 May 1991 Assembly of Madrid election results →
Parties and alliances	Popular vote			Seats	
Parties and alliances	Votes	%	±pp	Total	+/−
People's Party (PP)^{1}	956,865	42.67	+10.88	47	+15
Spanish Socialist Workers' Party (PSOE)	820,510	36.59	−1.86	41	+1
United Left (IU)	270,558	12.07	+4.59	13	+6
Democratic and Social Centre (CDS)	75,081	3.35	−13.28	0	−17
The Greens (LV)	35,095	1.57	+0.49	0	±0
The Ecologists (LE)	12,897	0.58	New	0	±0
Green Union (UVE)^{2}	8,903	0.40	−0.13	0	±0
Madrilenian Independent Regional Party (PRIM)	7,883	0.35	New	0	±0
Workers' Socialist Party (PST)	7,736	0.34	New	0	±0
Party of Madrid (PAM)	4,382	0.20	New	0	±0
Convergence of Independent Candidacies (CCI)	2,248	0.10	New	0	±0
Revolutionary Workers' Party of Spain (PORE)	2,187	0.10	New	0	±0
Aranjuez Independent Group (AIDA)	1,899	0.08	New	0	±0
Alliance for the Republic (AxR)^{3}	1,891	0.08	−0.07	0	±0
Left Platform (PCE (m–l)–CRPE)	1,847	0.08	New	0	±0
United Republican Action (ARU)	1,346	0.06	New	0	±0
Madrilenian Centrist Union (UCM)	1,329	0.06	New	0	±0
Generational Integration (IG)	815	0.04	New	0	±0
Blank ballots	28,872	1.29	−0.45		
Total	2,242,344			101	+5
Valid votes	2,242,344	99.59	+0.81		
Invalid votes	9,269	0.41	−0.81		
Votes cast / turnout	2,251,613	58.67	−11.20		
Abstentions	1,586,067	41.33	+11.20		
Registered voters	3,837,680				
Sources
Footnotes: ^{1} People's Party results are compared to the combined totals of People's Alliance and People's Democratic Party in the 1987 election.; ^{2} Green Union results are compared to Confederation of the Greens totals in the 1987 election.; ^{3} Alliance for the Republic results are compared to Internationalist Socialist Workers' Party totals in the 1987 election.

Popular vote
PP	42.67%
PSOE	36.59%
IU	12.07%
CDS	3.35%
LV	1.57%
Others	2.47%
Blank ballots	1.29%

Seats
PP	46.53%
PSOE	40.59%
IU	12.87%

== Aftermath ==
=== Government formation ===
Investiture; Nomination of Joaquín Leguina (PSOE)
Ballot →	11 July 1991
Required majority →	51 out of 101
Yes: • PSOE (41); • IU (13)	54 / 101
No: • PP (47)	47 / 101
Abstentions	0 / 101
Absentees	0 / 101

== Bibliography ==
- Ley Orgánica 3/1983, de 25 de febrero, de Estatuto de Autonomía de la Comunidad de Madrid (Organic Law 3/1983). Official State Gazette (in Spanish). 25 February 1983 [version as of 14 March 1991]. BOE-A-1983-6317.
- Ley Orgánica 5/1985, de 19 de junio, del Régimen Electoral General (Organic Law 5/1985). Official State Gazette (in Spanish). 19 June 1985 [version as of 14 March 1991]. BOE-A-1985-11672.
- Ley 11/1986, de 16 de diciembre, Electoral de la Comunidad de Madrid (Law 11/1986). Official State Gazette (in Spanish). 16 December 1986 [version as of 25 March 1991]. BOE-A-1987-4255.
- Ley 5/1990, de 17 de mayo, reguladora de la facultad de disolución de la Asamblea de Madrid por el Presidente de la Comunidad (Law 5/1990). Official State Gazette (in Spanish). 17 May 1990 [version as of 29 May 1990]. BOE-A-1987-4255.
- Decreto 20/1991, de 1 de abril, del Presidente, por el que se convocan elecciones a la Asamblea de Madrid (Decree 20/1991). Official State Gazette (in Spanish). 1 April 1991. BOE-A-1991-7972.
