= Gustavo Villapalos =

Spanish academic and politician (1949–2021)

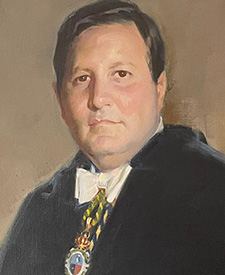
Photo of Gustavo Villapalos Salas

Gustavo Villapalos Salas (15 October 1949 – 15 June 2021) was a Spanish academic and politician. He was rector of Complutense University of Madrid from 1987 to 1995.
