= Luis Guillermo Perinat y Elío =

Spanish politician and diplomat

- Born: October 27, 1923 (age 102); Madrid, Spain

Luis Guillermo Perinat y Elío, 8th Marquess of Campo Real, GE (born 27 October 1923) is a Spanish politician and diplomat.

He served as Spain's ambassador to the United Kingdom and the Soviet Union, was a member of the Assembly of Madrid during its first legislature (1983–1987), and later served as both a senator and a deputy in the Cortes Generales from 1982 to 1993.

== Biography ==
He is the son of Luis de Périnat and Ana María de Elío y Gaztelu, 2nd Marchioness of Campo Real and Grandee of Spain, who later married Valentín Menéndez San Juan, Count of la Cimera. Perinat studied in Tudela at the Church and College of San Francisco Javier and later at the Colegio Nuestra Señora del Pilar in Madrid. He earned a law degree from the University of Madrid and entered the diplomatic corps in 1948.

He was accredited as Spain's ambassador to the United Kingdom on 24 March 1976. After his mission in London, he served as ambassador to the Soviet Union from 6 March 1981 to 23 February 1983.

Perinat resigned from his ambassadorship in Moscow to lead the coalition ticket of People's Alliance (AP), the People's Democratic Party (PDP) and Liberal Union (UL) for the first elections to the Assembly of Madrid held in May 1983. He was elected to the chamber for its first legislature, and served as spokesperson for the Popular Parliamentary Group until May 1985.

Perinat was one of the delegates appointed by the Cortes Generales to represent Spain as a Member of the European Parliament (MEP) following Spain's accession to the European Economic Community. He later became one of the chamber's vice-presidents. He was subsequently elected in the European elections of 10 June 1987, serving until July 1989.

In the 1989 general election he was elected to the Congress of Deputies representing Murcia, serving during the IV legislature.

He has held the noble titles of Marquess of Campo Real, Marquess of Perinat and Baron of Ezpeleta.
