= Entrevías =

Neighborhood in Madrid, Spain

Coordinates: 40°24′N 3°41′W

- City neighborhood
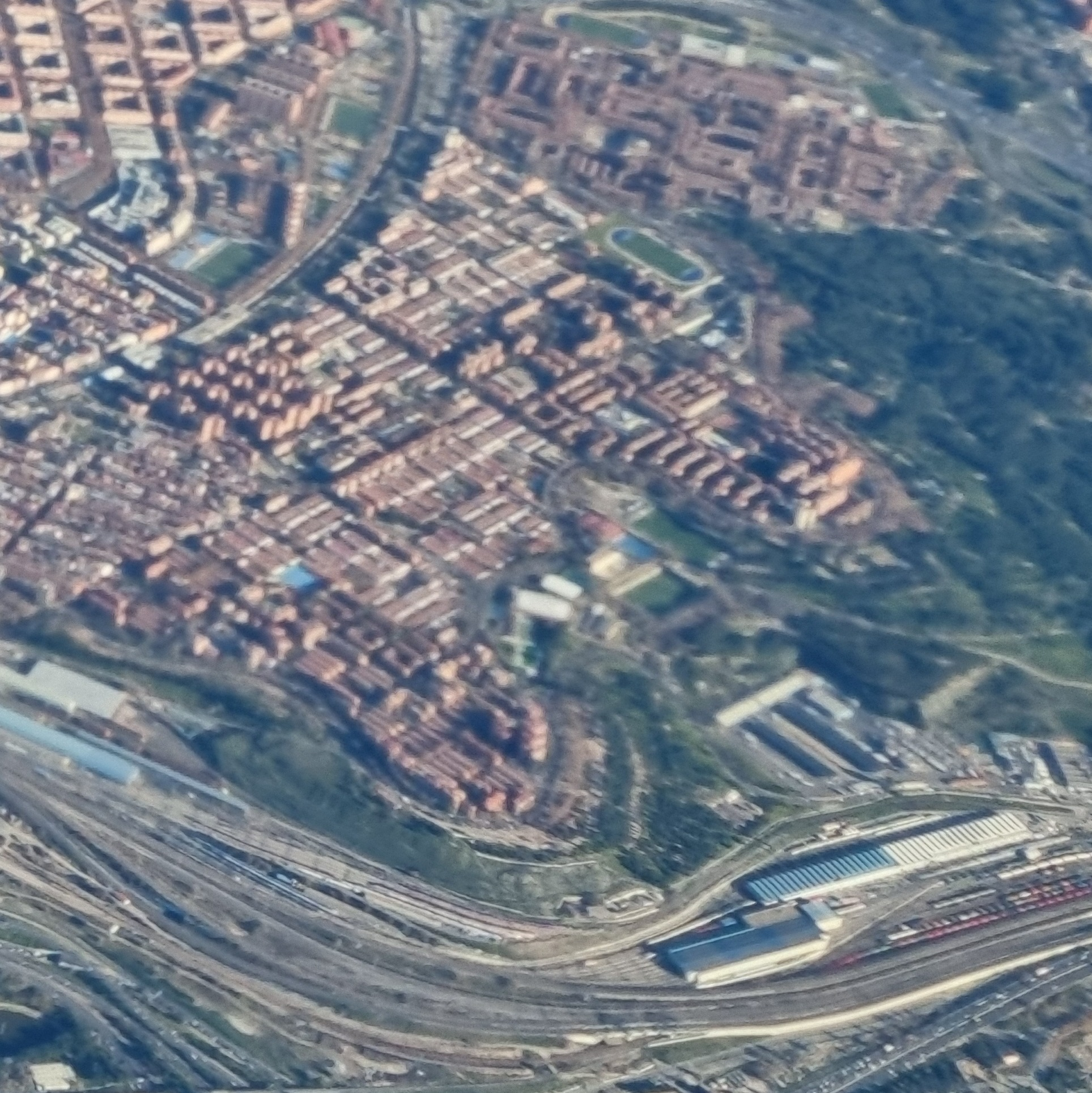
- Interactive map of Entrevías
- Country: Spain
- Autonomous community: Madrid
- Municipality: Madrid
- District: Puente de Vallecas

Entrevías is a neighbourhood of Madrid belonging to the district of Puente de Vallecas. As of 2019, it was the poorest neighborhood in the municipality.

According to the National Institute of Statistics, the population of Entrevías in 2006 was 37,790. According to City Council of Madrid by 2023 the population had reduced to 35,399.

The Spanish television series Entrevías, first airing on Telecinco and distributed as Wrong Side of the Tracks on Netflix in English markets, is set in a fictionalized version of the neighborhood.
