= Joaquín Leguina =

Spanish politician (born 1941)

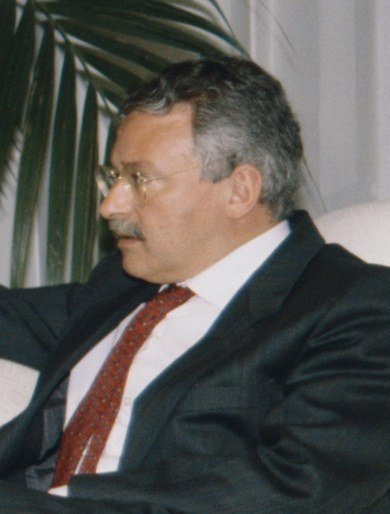

President of the Community of Madrid
- In office 13 June 1983 – 30 June 1995
- Monarch: Juan Carlos I
- Deputy: César Cimadevilla
- Preceded by: None
- Succeeded by: Alberto Ruiz-Gallardón

Secretary-General of the Madrilenian Socialist Federation
- In office 14 December 1979 – 2 February 1991
- Preceded by: Alonso Puerta
- Succeeded by: Teófilo Serrano

Member of the Congress of Deputies
- In office 3 March 1996 – 1 April 2008
- Constituency: Madrid
- In office 28 October 1982 – 8 May 1983
- Constituency: Madrid

Member of the Assembly of Madrid
- In office 8 May 1983 – 1 July 1995

Member of Madrid Municipal Council
- In office 15 May 1979 – 8 May 1983

Personal details
- Born: Joaquín Leguina Herrán; 5 May 1941 (age 85) Villaescusa, Spain
- Party: Spanish Socialist Workers' Party (until 2022)
- Education: University of the Basque Country

Joaquín Leguina Herrán (born 5 May 1941) is a Spanish politician and writer. A former member of the Spanish Socialist Workers' Party (PSOE) from which he was expelled in 2022 over strong differences with Pedro Sánchez, he became the first President of the Community of Madrid, serving from 1983 and 1995. He also was Secretary-General of the Socialist Party of Madrid from 1979 to 1991.

== Biography ==
=== Early career ===
Leguina was born in Villaescusa, Cantabria. He graduated in General Economics, specialising in Economic Science at the University of Bilbao in 1964. In November 1972 he achieved his Doctorate in Economic Science at the Complutense University of Madrid, reading Foundations and applications of demographic analysis. In February 1973 he received a second Doctorate in Demography at the Sorbonne on the Analysis of and perspectives on the total population and the workforce: Spain 1960–1980.

Leguina started to work for the government as a Faculty Statistician for the National Statistics Institute in 1967. Between 1968 and 1972 and again between 1974 and 1979, he was a professor at the Complutense University. Between 1970 and 1973 he represented Spain at various international demographics conferences including at the United Nations, OECD and Council of Europe.

In 1973, he became a demographics expert for the UNECLAC. As a member of the organisation in Chile, he was a witness to the coup d'état by Augusto Pinochet.

=== Political career ===
Leguina had engaged in political activities at university, in anti-fascist groups. He joined the Popular Liberation Front, later the Socialist Convergence of Madrid, which later merged into the PSOE.

He was elected to the City Council of Madrid in the 1979 local elections and joined the Finance Ministry headed by Enrique Tierno Galván. Leguina was elected the General Secretary of the Madrilenian Socialist Federation. At the 1982 general election, Leguina was elected for the Madrid constituency, but resigned his seat shortly after being elected once the PSOE won an overall majority in the 1983 Assembly election. He became the President of the Community of Madrid on 15 June 1983, a position he held until the 1995 elections, when he was succeeded by Alberto Ruiz-Gallardón. Leguina faced a confidence vote in 1989, but stayed in power due to an AP rebel, Nicolás Piñeiro Cuesta, who gave his vote to Leguina.

After leaving the presidency of the Madrid region, he became a member of the PSOE National Executive Board presided by Joaquín Almunia. He also returned to the Congress of Deputies, becoming a member of the 6th, 7th and 8th terms of the Lower House in representation of Madrid. During the 8th term he chaired the Defence Committee of the Congress of Deputies.

== Positions ==
A staunch critic of the Catalan pro-independence movement, he became a member of the Libres e Iguales platform in 2014, signing their manifesto. Later the same year, he likened Artur Mas to the Pied Piper of Hamelin.

== Works ==
- Los ríos desbordados, un ensayo político. Plaza & Janes, 1994.
- La luz crepuscular. Alfaguara, 2009.
- Os salvaré la vida (together with Rubén Buren). Espasa, 2017. (Note: Awarded with the Premio de Novela Histórica Alfonso X El Sabio in 2017. The authors were accused by Gabriel Bobé of having plagiarised Arturo Barea's La forja de un rebelde.)

== Notes ==
Political offices
Preceded by Office created	President of the Community of Madrid; 1983–1995	Succeeded by Alberto Ruiz-Gallardón
Party political offices
Preceded by Alonso Puerta	Secretary-General of the Madrilenian Socialist Federation; 1979–1991	Succeeded by Teófilo Serrano
Preceded by José Barrionuevo	Leader of the Socialist Group in the Madrid City Council; 1982–1983	Succeeded by Juan Barranco
