= Communist Party of Madrid =

Communist Party of Madrid Partido Comunista de Madrid (PCM)
- Secretary-General: Álvaro Aguilera
- Headquarters: Martin de Vargas, 46. Madrid
- Ideology: Marxism-Leninism
- Political position: Far-left
- National affiliation: Communist Party of Spain
- Regional affiliation: United Left of the Community of Madrid (1986-2015); Ahora Madrid (2015-2019); United Left–Madrid (since 2016)

Website
- https://madrid.pce.es/

The Communist Party of Madrid (in Spanish: Partido Comunista de Madrid) is the federation of the Communist Party of Spain (PCE) in the Community of Madrid.
