= List of Madrid councillors (2011–2015) =

This list presents the members of the Madrid Municipal Council in the 2011–2015 period, including substitutes:

Full name	Municipal group/ Electoral list	Term start	Term end
María Josefa Aguado del Olmo	PP	11 June 2011	13 June 2015
Luis Asúa Brunt	PP	11 June 2011	31 January 2012
Álvaro Ballarín Valcárcel	PP	11 June 2011	13 June 2015
Jaime María de Berenguer de Santiago	UPyD	11 June 2011	13 June 2015
José Manuel Berzal Andrade	PP	11 June 2011	13 June 2015
Ana María Botella Serrano	PP	11 June 2011	13 June 2015
Luis Miguel Boto Martínez	PP	11 June 2011	13 June 2015
Rosalía Bravo Martín	IU–LV	27 March 2015	13 June 2015
Juan Bravo Rivera	PP	11 June 2011	13 January 2012
Francisco Cabaco López	PSOE	11 June 2011	13 June 2015
Gabriel Calles Hernánsanz	PSOE	11 June 2011	13 June 2015
Pedro Luis Calvo Poch	PP	11 June 2011	13 June 2015
Juan Francisco Carcelén García	IU–LV	20 February 2015	13 June 2015
Cristina Chamorro Muñoz	UPyD	11 June 2011	13 June 2015
Manuel Cobo Vega	PP	11 June 2011	13 January 2012
Pedro María Corral Corral	PP	7 February 2012	13 June 2015
Diego Cruz Torrijos	PSOE	11 June 2011	13 June 2015
María Concepción Dancausa Treviño	PP	11 June 2011	14 April 2015
Ángel Donesteve Velázquez-Gaztelu	PP	30 January 2013	13 June 2015
Eva Durán Ramos	PP	11 June 2011	13 June 2015
David Erguido Cano	PP	11 June 2011	13 June 2015
María Belén Fernández-Salinero García	PP	28 April 2015	13 June 2015
Jorge García Castaño	IU–LV	11 June 2011	27 January 2015
Ana García D'Atri	PSOE	11 June 2011	13 June 2015
Patricia García López	UPyD	11 June 2011	13 June 2015
Paloma García Romero	PP	11 June 2011	13 June 2015
Pedro Pablo García-Rojo Garrido	PSOE	11 June 2011	13 June 2015
Ángel Garrido García	PP	11 June 2011	13 June 2015
Jose Antonio González de la Rosa	PP	7 February 2012	13 June 2015
María de la Paz González García	PP	11 June 2011	13 June 2015
Elena González Moñux	PP	11 June 2011	31 January 2012
Pedro Javier González Zerolo	PSOE	11 June 2011	9 June 2015
Milagros Hernández Calvo	IU–LV	11 June 2011	13 June 2015
Carlos Izquierdo Torres	PP	11 June 2011	14 March 2012
Ángel Lara Martín de Bernardo	IU–LV	11 June 2011	20 February 2015
María Begoña Larraínzar Zaballa	PP	11 June 2011	13 June 2015
Patricia Lázaro Martínez de Morentin	PP	11 June 2011	13 June 2015
Jaime José Lissavetzky Díez	PSOE	11 June 2011	13 June 2015
Luis Llorente Olivares	PSOE	11 June 2011	13 June 2015
Raquel López Contreras	IU–LV	11 June 2011	13 June 2015
Almudena Maíllo del Valle	PP	17 January 2012	13 June 2015
Noelia Martínez Espinosa	PSOE	11 June 2011	13 June 2015
María del Pilar Martínez López	PP	11 June 2011	13 January 2012
Joaquín María Martínez Navarro	PP	11 June 2011	13 June 2015
Fernando Martínez Vidal	PP	11 June 2011	13 June 2015
María Isabel Martínez-Cubells Yraola	PP	11 June 2011	13 June 2015
María del Prado de la Mata Riesco	IU–LV	11 June 2011	13 June 2015
Alberto Mateo Otero	PSOE	11 June 2011	13 June 2015
Jesús Moreno Sánchez	PP	11 June 2011	13 June 2015
María Dolores Navarro Ruiz	PP	11 June 2011	13 June 2015
José Enrique Núñez Guijarro	PP	11 June 2011	13 June 2015
María Fátima Inés Núñez Valentín	PP	28 March 2012	13 June 2015
David Ortega Gutiérrez	UPyD	11 June 2011	13 June 2015
Luis Mariano Palacios Pérez	UPyD	11 June 2011	13 June 2015
Ángel Pérez Martínez	IU–LV	11 June 2011	13 June 2015
Ruth Porta Cantoni	PSOE	11 June 2011	13 June 2015
María del Carmen Rodríguez Flores	PP	27 December 2011	13 June 2015
Ana María Román Martín	PP	11 June 2011	13 June 2015
Alberto Ruiz-Gallardón Jiménez	PP	11 June 2011	22 December 2011
María Carmen Sánchez Carazo	PSOE	11 June 2011	13 June 2015
María Elena Sánchez Gallar	PP	11 June 2011	13 June 2015
Ana Rosario de Sande Guillén	PSOE	11 June 2011	13 June 2015
Diego Sanjuanbenito Bonal	PP	17 January 2012	13 June 2015
Marcos Sanz Agüero	PSOE	11 June 2011	13 June 2015
Carmen Torralba González	PP	11 June 2011	13 June 2015
Manuel Troitiño Pelaz	PP	17 January 2012	13 June 2015
Miguel Ángel Villanueva González	PP	11 June 2011	13 January 2013
María Luisa de Ybarra Bernardo	PSOE	11 June 2011	13 June 2015
