= List of Madrid councillors (2003–2007) =

This list presents the members of the Madrid Municipal Council in the 2003–2007 period, including substitutes:

Full name	Municipal group/ Electoral list	Term start	Term end
María Concepción Aguillaume Oliveros	PSOE	27 September 2006	16 June 2007
Félix Arias Goytre	PSOE	14 June 2003	16 June 2007
Elena Arnedo Soriano	PSOE	14 June 2003	17 May 2004
Luis Asúa Brunt	PP	14 June 2003	16 June 2007
Enrique Carlos Barón Crespo	PSOE	14 June 2003	17 May 2004
José Manuel Berzal Andrade	PP	14 June 2003	16 June 2007
Ana María Botella Serrano	PP	14 June 2003	16 June 2007
Luis Miguel Boto Martínez	PP	27 October 2005	16 June 2007
Juan Bravo Rivera	PP	14 June 2003	16 June 2007
Justo Calcerrada Bravo	IU	14 June 2003	16 June 2007
Pedro Luis Calvo Poch	PP	14 June 2003	16 June 2007
Manuel Cobo Vega	PP	14 June 2003	16 June 2007
Miguel Conejero Melchor	PSOE	14 June 2003	16 June 2007
José Contreras Sánchez	PSOE	29 October 2004	16 June 2007
Sandra María de Lorite Buendía	PP	14 June 2003	16 June 2007
Ana Rosario de Sande Guillén	PSOE	31 May 2004	16 June 2007
Concepción Denche Morón	IU	14 June 2003	16 June 2007
Ignacio Díaz Plaza	PSOE	14 June 2003	28 September 2004
Eva Durán Ramos	PP	14 June 2003	16 June 2007
María Pilar Estébanez Estébanez	PSOE	14 June 2003	16 June 2007
Cándido Fernández González-Calero	PSOE	31 May 2004	16 June 2007
Joaquín García Pontes	PSOE	14 June 2003	16 June 2007
Paloma García Romero	PP	14 June 2003	16 June 2007
Pío García-Escudero Márquez	PP	14 June 2003	14 April 2004
Manuel García-Hierro Caraballo	PSOE	14 June 2003	16 June 2007
Ángel Garrido García	PP	14 June 2003	16 June 2007
María de la Paz González García	PP	14 June 2003	16 June 2007
Elena González Moñux	PP	14 June 2003	16 June 2007
Pedro Javier González Zerolo	PSOE	14 June 2003	16 June 2007
Íñigo Henríquez de Luna Losada	PP	14 June 2003	16 June 2007
María Teresa Hernández Rodríguez	PSOE	14 June 2003	16 June 2007
Sigfrido Herráez Rodríguez	PP	14 June 2003	26 September 2005
Óscar Iglesias Fernández	PSOE	14 June 2003	16 June 2007
Carlos Izquierdo Torres	PP	14 June 2003	16 June 2007
Trinidad Jiménez García-Herrera	PSOE	14 June 2003	27 September 2006
María Begoña Larraínzar Zaballa	PP	14 June 2003	16 June 2007
Patricia Lázaro Martínez de Morentin	PP	14 June 2003	16 June 2007
Rosa León Conde	PSOE	14 June 2003	16 June 2007
Noelia Martínez Espinosa	PSOE	14 June 2003	16 June 2007
María del Pilar Martínez López	PP	14 June 2003	16 June 2007
Rafael Merino López-Brea	PSOE	14 June 2003	16 June 2007
Julio Misiego Gascón	IU	14 June 2003	16 June 2007
Alicia Moreno Espert	PP	14 June 2003	16 June 2007
Jesús Moreno Sánchez	PP	27 April 2004	16 June 2007
María Dolores Navarro Ruiz	PP	14 June 2003	16 June 2007
José Enrique Núñez Guijarro	PP	14 June 2003	16 June 2007
María Fátima Inés Núñez Valentín	PP	14 June 2003	16 June 2007
José Manuel Rodríguez Martínez	PSOE	14 June 2003	16 June 2007
Marta María Rodríguez-Tarduchy Díez	PSOE	14 June 2003	17 May 2004
Ana María Román Martín	PP	14 June 2003	16 June 2007
Alberto Ruiz-Gallardón Jiménez	PP	14 June 2003	16 June 2007
Inés Sabanés Nadal	IU	14 June 2003	16 June 2007
Nieves Sáez de Adana Oliver	PP	14 June 2003	16 June 2007
María Carmen Sánchez Carazo	PSOE	14 June 2003	16 June 2007
María Elena Sánchez Gallar	PP	14 June 2003	16 June 2007
Pedro Sánchez Pérez-Castejón	PSOE	31 May 2004	16 June 2007
Pedro Santín Fernández	PSOE	14 June 2003	16 June 2007
José Tomás Serrano Guío	PP	14 June 2003	16 June 2007
Ramón Silva Buenadicha	PSOE	14 June 2003	16 June 2007
Carmen Torralba González	PP	14 June 2003	16 June 2007
Manuel Troitiño Pelaz	PP	14 June 2003	16 June 2007
Isabel María Vilallonga Elviro	PSOE	14 June 2003	16 June 2007
