= List of Madrid councillors (2007–2011) =

This list presents the members of the Madrid Municipal Council in the 2007–2011 period, including substitutes:

Full name	Municipal group/ Electoral list	Term start	Term end
Ángeles Álvarez Álvarez	PSOE	16 June 2007	11 June 2011
Luis Asúa Brunt	PP	16 June 2007	11 June 2011
Álvaro Ballarín Valcárcel	PP	16 June 2007	11 June 2011
José Manuel Berzal Andrade	PP	16 June 2007	11 June 2011
Ana María Botella Serrano	PP	16 June 2007	11 June 2011
Luis Miguel Boto Martínez	PP	16 June 2007	11 June 2011
Juan Bravo Rivera	PP	16 June 2007	11 June 2011
Gabriel Calles Hernánsanz	PSOE	29 October 2009	11 June 2011
Pedro Luis Calvo Poch	PP	16 June 2007	11 June 2011
María Dolores del Campo Pozas	PSOE	16 June 2007	11 June 2011
Manuel Cobo Vega	PP	16 June 2007	11 June 2011
Beatriz Corredor Sierra	PSOE	27 September 2007	12 April 2008
María Concepción Dancausa Treviño	PP	16 June 2007	11 June 2011
Eva Durán Ramos	PP	16 June 2007	11 June 2011
Almudena Fernández Cantó	PSOE	30 May 2008	11 June 2011
Pilar Esther Gallego Berruezo	PSOE	16 June 2007	30 April 2008
Paloma García Romero	PP	16 June 2007	11 June 2011
Manuel García-Hierro Caraballo	PSOE	16 June 2007	11 June 2011
Pedro Pablo García-Rojo Garrido	PSOE	16 June 2007	11 June 2011
Ángel Garrido García	PP	16 June 2007	11 June 2011
María del Carmen González Fernández	PP	16 June 2007	11 June 2011
María de la Paz González García	PP	16 June 2007	11 June 2011
Elena González Moñux	PP	16 June 2007	11 June 2011
Pedro Javier González Zerolo	PSOE	16 June 2007	11 June 2011
Íñigo Henríquez de Luna Losada	PP	16 June 2007	11 June 2011
Milagros Hernández Calvo	IU	16 June 2007	11 June 2011
Óscar Iglesias Fernández	PSOE	16 June 2007	11 June 2011
Alejandro Inurrieta Beruete	PSOE	30 May 2008	11 June 2011
Carlos Izquierdo Torres	PP	16 June 2007	11 June 2011
Ángel Lara Martín de Bernardo	IU	16 June 2007	11 June 2011
María Begoña Larraínzar Zaballa	PP	16 June 2007	11 June 2011
Patricia Lázaro Martínez de Morentin	PP	16 June 2007	11 June 2011
Rosa León Conde	PSOE	16 June 2007	27 September 2007
Raquel López Contreras	IU	16 June 2007	11 June 2011
Sandra María de Lorite Buendía	PP	16 June 2007	11 June 2011
Francisco David Lucas Parrón	PSOE	16 June 2007	11 June 2011
Noelia Martínez Espinosa	PSOE	16 June 2007	11 June 2011
María del Pilar Martínez López	PP	16 June 2007	11 June 2011
Joaquín María Martínez Navarro	PP	16 June 2007	11 June 2011
Fernando Martínez Vidal	PP	16 June 2007	11 June 2011
María Isabel Martínez-Cubells Yraola	PP	16 June 2007	11 June 2011
Daniel Morcillo Álvarez	IU	16 June 2007	11 June 2011
Jesús Moreno Sánchez	PP	16 June 2007	11 June 2011
María Dolores Navarro Ruiz	PP	16 June 2007	11 June 2011
José Enrique Núñez Guijarro	PP	16 June 2007	11 June 2011
María Mercedes Elvira del Palacio Tascón	PSOE	16 June 2007	24 July 2007
Ángel Pérez Martínez	IU	16 June 2007	11 June 2011
José Manuel Rodríguez Martínez	PSOE	16 June 2007	11 June 2011
Ana María Román Martín	PP	16 June 2007	11 June 2011
Alberto Ruiz-Gallardón Jiménez	PP	16 June 2007	11 June 2011
María Carmen Sánchez Carazo	PSOE	16 June 2007	11 June 2011
María Elena Sánchez Gallar	PP	16 June 2007	11 June 2011
Pedro Sánchez Pérez-Castejón	PSOE	16 June 2007	25 September 2009
Pedro Santín Fernández	PSOE	16 June 2007	11 June 2011
José Tomás Serrano Guío	PP	16 June 2007	11 June 2011
Ana Rosario de Sande Guillén	PSOE	16 June 2007	11 June 2011
Ramón Silva Buenadicha	PSOE	16 June 2007	11 June 2011
Carmen Torralba González	PP	16 June 2007	11 June 2011
Manuel Troitiño Pelaz	PP	16 June 2007	11 June 2011
Daniel Vicente Viondi	PSOE	26 October 2007	11 June 2011
Isabel María Vilallonga Elviro	PSOE	16 June 2007	11 June 2011
Miguel Angel Villanueva González	PP	16 June 2007	11 June 2011
