= List of Madrid councillors (2019–2023) =

Full name	Municipal group/ Electoral list	Term start	Term end
José Aniorte Rueda	Cs	15 June 2019	
María del Mar Barberán Parrado	Más Madrid	10 January 2020	
José Javier Barbero Gutiérrez	Más Madrid	15 June 2019	
Pedro Esteban Barrero Cuadrado	PSOE	15 June 2019	
Ignacio de Benito Pérez	PSOE	29 September 2020	
Arantzazu Purificación Cabello López	Vox	15 June 2019	
José Manuel Calvo del Olmo	Más Madrid	15 June 2019	8 September 2021
José Manuel Calvo del Olmo		8 September 2021	
Francisco de Borja Carabante Muntada	PP	15 June 2019	
Manuela Carmena Castrillo	Más Madrid	15 June 2019	1 July 2019
Martín Casariego Córdoba	Cs	15 June 2019	
Sonia Cea Quintana	PP	15 June 2019	
Concepción Chapa Monteagudo	Cs	15 June 2019	
Luis Cueto Álvarez de Sotomayor	Más Madrid	15 June 2019	8 September 2021
Luis Cueto Álvarez de Sotomayor	Indep.	8 September 2021	
Maysoun Douas Maadi	Más Madrid	15 June 2019	
María Mar Espinar Mesa Moles	PSOE	15 June 2019	
Francisco de Borja Fanjul Fernández-Pita	PP	15 June 2019	
Pedro Fernández Hernández	Vox	15 June 2019	
José Fernández Sánchez	PP	15 June 2019	
Mariano Fuentes Sedano	Cs	15 June 2019	
Jorge García Castaño	Más Madrid	15 June 2019	
Paloma García Romero	PP	15 June 2019	
María de las Mercedes González Fernández	PSOE	15 June 2019	5 April 2021
Marta Gómez Lahoz	Más Madrid	15 June 2019	27 October 2020
Esther Gómez Morante	Más Madrid	15 June 2019	
Pepu Hernández Fernández	PSOE	15 June 2019	2 September 2021
Alfredo González Gómez	PSOE	15 June 2019	9 September 2020
Álvaro González López	PP	15 June 2019	
María Cayetana Hernández de la Riva	PP	15 June 2019	
Engracia Hidalgo Tena	PP	15 June 2019	
Marta Higueras Garrobo	Más Madrid	15 June 2019	8 September 2021
Marta Higueras Garrobo	Indep.	8 September 2021	
Andrea Levy Soler	PP	15 June 2019	
Luis Felipe Llamas Sánchez	Más Madrid	15 June 2019	8 September 2021
Luis Felipe Llamas Sánchez	Indep.	8 September 2021	27 December 2021
Enma López Araujo	PSOE	15 June 2019	
Félix López-Rey Gómez	Más Madrid	15 June 2019	
Rita Maestre Fernández	Más Madrid	15 June 2019	
Almudena Maíllo del Valle	PP	15 June 2019	
Emilia Martínez Garrido	PSOE	23 February 2021	
José Luis Martínez-Almeida Navasqüés	PP	15 June 2019	
Santiago Saura Martínez de Toda	Cs	15 June 2019	
Fernando Martínez Vidal	Vox	15 June 2019	
Sofía Miranda Esteban	Cs	15 June 2019	
Miguel Montejo Bombín	Más Madrid	15 June 2019	
Ignacio Murgui Parra	Más Madrid	15 June 2019	
José Luis Nieto Bueno	Más Madrid	29 October 2019	
Ángel Niño Quesada	Cs	15 June 2019	
Francisco Javier Ortega Smith-Molina	Vox	15 June 2019	
Maite Pacheco Mateo-Sagasta	PSOE	15 June 2019	26 January 2021
Pilar Perea Moreno	Más Madrid	15 June 2019	
Francisco Pérez Ramos	Más Madrid	15 June 2019	
Blanca Pinedo Texidor	PP	15 June 2019	
Carolina Pulido Castro	Más Madrid	29 July 2019	
Francisco Javier Ramírez Caro	PP	15 June 2019	
Miguel Ángel Redondo Rodríguez	Cs	15 June 2019	
Amanda Romero García	Más Madrid	24 November 2020	
Silvia Saavedra Ibarrondo	Cs	15 June 2019	
Inés Sabanés Nadal	Más Madrid	15 June 2019	20 December 2019
María Pilar Sánchez Álvarez	Más Madrid	15 June 2019	
María Estrella Sánchez Fernández	Más Madrid	15 June 2019	29 September 2020
María Inmaculada Sanz Otero	PP	15 June 2019	
Alberto Serrano Patiño	Cs	15 June 2019	
Ramón Silva Buenadicha	PSOE	15 June 2019	
Loreto Sordo Ruiz	PP	15 June 2019	
Pablo Soto Bravo	Más Madrid	15 June 2019	8 October 2019
Álvaro Vidal González	PSOE	27 April 2021	
Begoña Villacís Sánchez	Cs	15 June 2019	
