= Diego Sanjuanbenito =

Spanish politician

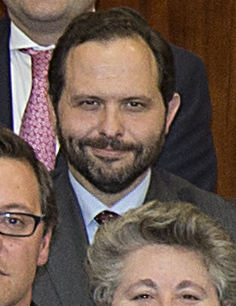

Member of the Assembly of Madrid
- In office 9 July 2015 – 23 November 2016

Madrid City Councillor
- In office 17 January 2012 – 13 June 2015

Personal details
- Born: 11 March 1978; Madrid
- Citizenship: Spanish
- Political party: People's Party
- Occupation: Politician

Diego Sanjuanbenito Bonal (born 11 March 1978) is a Spanish politician belonging from the People's Party (PP).

== Biography ==
Born 11 March 1978 in Madrid. A childhood buddy of the oldest son of the Aznar-Botella family, he developed a lasting bond to the family. He became a member of the New Generations of the People's Party when he was 19 years old. Graduated in Political and Administration Sciences at the Complutense University of Madrid, he worked as assistant to Santiago Fisas.

He ran 39th in the PP list for the 2007 Madrid City Council election, to no success. He was however appointed as Chief of Staff of Ana Botella in 2010, when she was the Delegate of Environment of the Madrid Municipal Government, entering the politics of the City Council. He ran 35th in the PP list for the 2011 municipal election in Madrid, but he was not elected either this time. Nonetheless, he became member of the city council in the 2011–2015 term, as he replaced on 17 January 2012 the vacant seat left by Pilar Martínez. A close collaborator of Botella, who had become Mayor in December 2011 (to the point Sanjuabenito was considered "shadow Vice Mayor"), Sanjuanbenito became the Delegate of Environment and Mobility of the municipal government on 10 May 2013, replacing Juan Antonio Gómez-Angulo, as the Constitutional Court had ruled against the designation as members of the government board of individuals not elected to the city council (as it was the case of Gómez-Angulo), declaring the appointments void.

Tentatively intended to run 62nd in the PP list for the 2015 Madrilenian regional election, his position was ultimately upgraded to the 51st place of the list, at the expense of Tomás Serrano. He was not elected either. He became a member of the 10th term of the Assembly of Madrid on 9 July 2015, replacing the vacant seat of José Tortosa de la Iglesia. He left his seat in the regional legislature on 23 November 2016, following his appointment as Director-General of Environment of the regional government. Following the investiture of Ángel Garrido as president of the Community of Madrid in May 2018, Sanjuanbenito was appointed as Vice-Minister of Humanization of Healthcare Assistance.

In 2018 he was sentenced to pay 2,8 million €, as he was found direct responsible (along other PP former councillors) of selling 1,860 dwellings under the market price to two Vulture funds linked to Blackstone in 2013, when he was councillor and member of the board of the Empresa Municipal de Vivienda y Suelo.

Political offices
Preceded by Juan Antonio Gómez-Angulo	Madrid's Delegate of Environment and Mobility; 10 May 2013 – 13 June 2015	Succeeded by Inés Sabanés
