= Economy of Madrid =

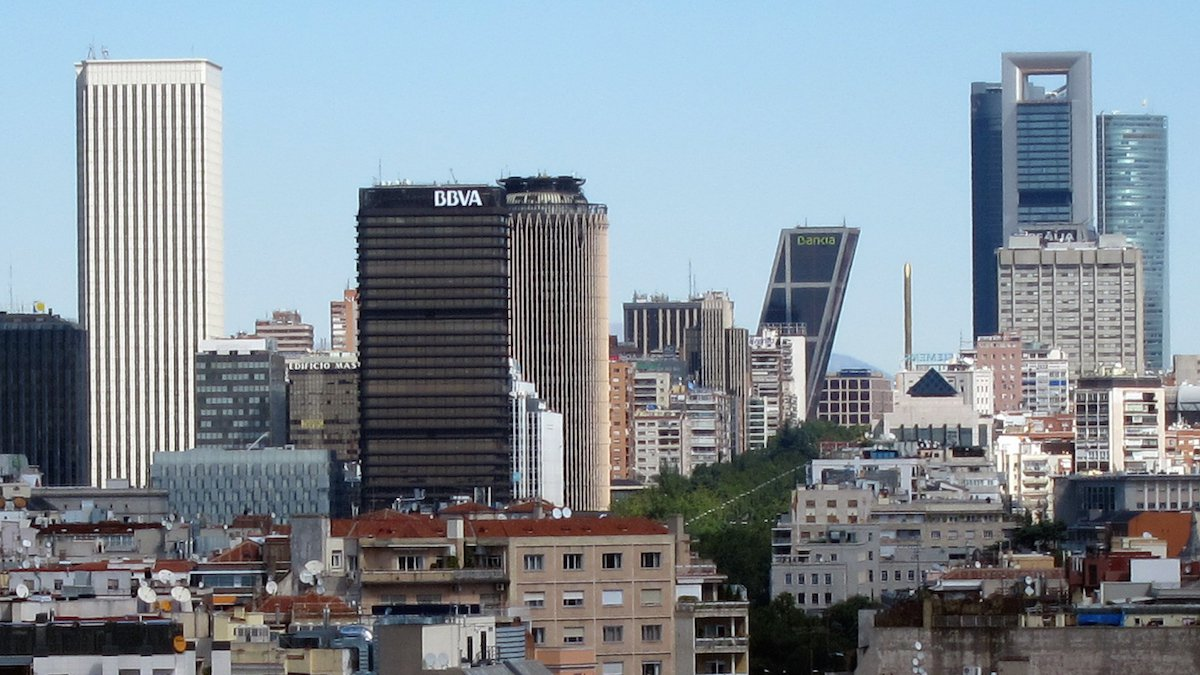
The AZCA business district with the CTBA business district at the background

After it became the capital of Spain in the 16th century, Madrid was more a centre of consumption than of production or trade. Economic activity was largely devoted to supplying the city's own rapidly growing population, including the royal household and national government, such trades as banking and publishing.

A large industrial sector did not develop until the 20th century, but thereafter industry greatly expanded and diversified, making Madrid the second industrial city in Spain. However, the economy of the city is now becoming more and more dominated by the service sector.

== Economic history ==
=== 16th to 18th centuries ===
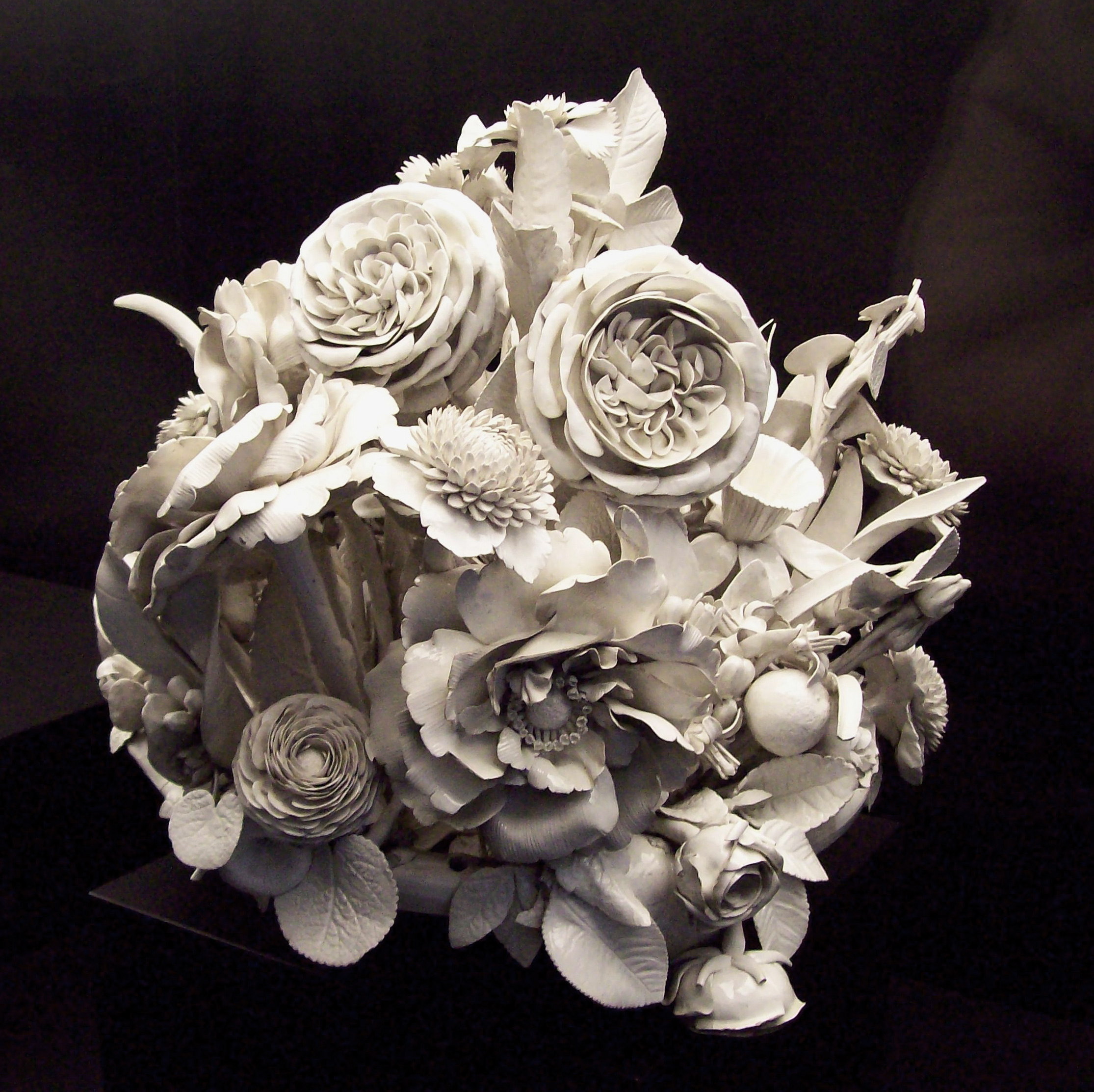
A porcelain flower centerpiece, made at the Buen Retiro Royal Porcelain factory, 18th century

==== Seat of government ====
After Philip II made Madrid the capital city of the Spanish Empire in 1561, the city experienced rapid growth. As Spain (like many other European countries) continued to centralize royal authority, particularly under the Bourbon monarchs, Madrid took on greater importance as a center of administration for Spain. It was sometimes described as an "economic parasite", sucking in the resources of the empire without directly generating wealth.

==== Manufacturing ====
During this period Madrid became an important nucleus of artisanal activity. Some proto-capitalist institutions were established, including the "Five Great Guilds" (Cinco Gremios Mayores) or the Banco de San Carlos, as well as producers to the royal household such as the Porcelana del Buen Retiro (porcelain) and the Fábrica de Tabacos (tobacco). The supply of goods to the city was a major concern of the national and municipal governments, and was accomplished through a complex network of agents and public and private institutions, functioning along mercantilist lines and centred upon the Plaza Mayor and a number of other marketplaces.

During the transition to capitalism, Madrid, unlike other cities such as London and Paris, did not become a great centre of trade. It was not a suitable location for trade at that time, due to its geographical position, far from the sea or navigable rivers. Thus Madrid remained largely a political and social centre, and served as a market for luxury goods and the agricultural produce of Castile – mainly grain.

=== 19th century ===
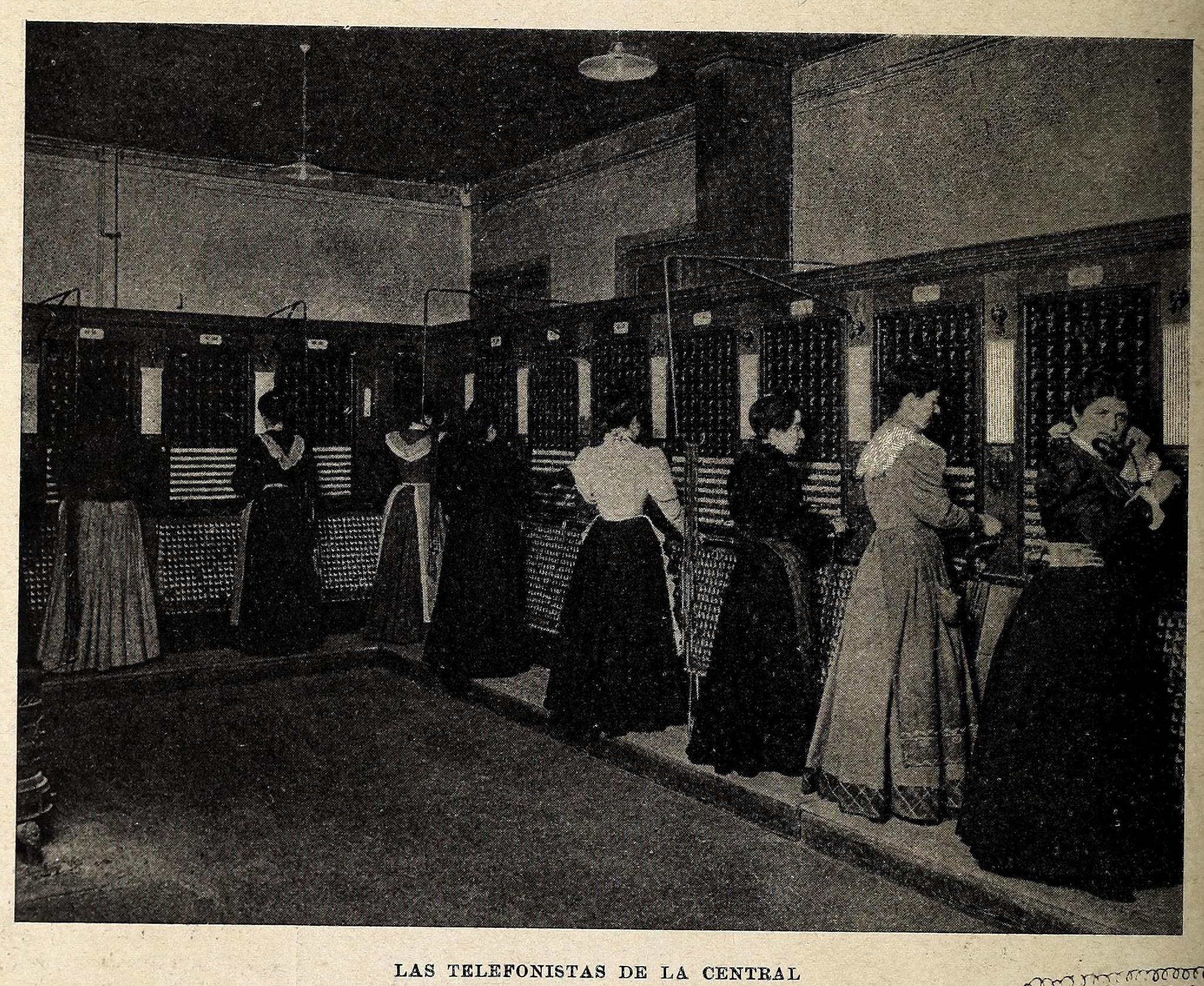
Phone workers (1898)

As the nineteenth century progressed Madrid became more integrated into national trade networks. This was associated with the development of railways and the political and economic changes of the Liberal era, including expropriations of property from religious institutions.

Unlike many of the other cities in Spain and elsewhere in Europe, Madrid did not become a leading center of industry during the nineteenth century. Construction remained one of the principal forms of economic activity: when the first rail link was built, to Aranjuez, it was mainly used for bringing in timber for construction, as there was little industrial plant needing a supply of other materials. One indicator of Madrid's industrial weakness was how little the workers’ movement developed there, its center of gravity remaining in Barcelona. The founding of the PSOE socialist party and the UGT trade union in Madrid were led by Pablo Iglesias, a printing worker: publishing was another of the long-standing forms of enterprise in the capital.

=== 20th century ===
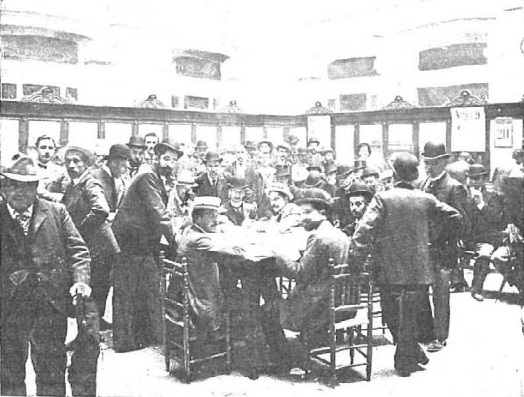
Stockbrokers in Madrid (c. 1902)

The major expansion of the city's industry occurred during the 20th century, mostly in the period following the Spanish Civil War, reaching levels of industrialization found in other major European cities. The economic output of the city shifted to chemicals, metallurgy, and high-technology production including precision engineering, electronics, and pharmaceuticals. Many national and multinational companies set up headquarters in the city, encouraged by its function as the center of government. At the same time, workers’ commissions (Comisiones Obreras), although illegal under the legislation of the Franco period, were set up in the factories that now surrounded the city.

Since the restoration of democracy in the late 1970s, despite efforts to decentralize the administration, the city has continued to expand. Its economy is now among the most dynamic and diverse in the European Union.

== Present-day economy ==
As the national capital, Madrid concentrates activities directly connected with power (central and regional government, headquarters of Spanish companies, regional HQ of multinationals, financial institutions) and with knowledge and technological innovation (research centres and universities). It is one of Europe's largest financial centres and the largest in Spain. In 2008, 72% of Spain's largest 2,000 companies had their headquarters in Madrid. The city has 17 universities and over 30 research centres.

Although the service sector predominates in its economy, Madrid continues to hold the position of Spain's second industrial centre after Barcelona, specialising particularly in high-technology production. Its location at the centre of the peninsula permits it to articulate the long-distance transport networks of the peninsula. The comparative advantages of Madrid have been decisive in capturing the larger part of foreign investment coming into Spain in recent years. It is the third metropolis in the EU by population, and the fourth by gross internal product. Leading employers include Telefónica, Iberia, Prosegur, BBVA, Urbaser, Dragados, and FCC.

=== Aggregated economic activity ===
The city of Madrid had a GDP of €124,780M in 2011. GDP per capita in 2011 was 74% above the national GDP per capita average and 70% above that of the 27 European Union member states. In comparison to the remainder of the Madrid region, the city is also substantially richer: although housing just over 50% of the Community of Madrid's population, it generates 65.9% of its GDP. The rapid growth - throughout the 1990s particularly - which converted Madrid into one of the most prosperous European cities was maintained for a large part of the decade of the 2000s, the growth rate being 3.4% pa 2000-2009. Following the recession commencing 2007/8, recovery was under way by 2014, with forecast growth rates for the city of 1.4% in 2014, 2.7% in 2015 and 2.8% in 2016.

In 2009, Madrid's per capita GDP lay 11% behind the average of the top 10 cities of the EU (it had been 14% behind in 2000). This is explained by lower rates of employment and, to a lesser extent, by lower labour productivity, but Madrid is catching up on both these factors, with productivity growing 2.5% pa in real terms.

The region of Madrid runs a heavily negative balance of foreign trade in every major class of goods: in 2013/14 exports totalled €28.97M, and imports €47.29M.

=== Standard of living ===
==== Income and expenditure ====
The mean income per "unit of consumption" (a weighted count of persons) in 2010 was €17,800, which was 12% above the figure for Spain. Similarly, the mean annual spending per household in the same year was €35,683, again 12% above the Spanish average.

One downside of Madrid's rapid economic development since 1992 has been the rising cost of living. Although residential property prices have fallen by 39% since 2007, the average price of dwelling space was €2,375.6 per sq. m. in early 2014, and was second only to London in a list of 22 European cities.

==== Income distribution ====
The proportion classified as "at risk of poverty" in 2010 was 15.6%, up from 13.0% in 2006 but less than the average for Spain of 21.8%. The proportion classified as affluent was 43.3%, up from 38.2% in 2006 and much higher than Spain overall (28.6%). The Gini coefficient, a measure of income inequality, was slightly less in the Madrid region (32.3) than the rest of Spain (34.0).

==== Impact of recession ====
Consumption by Madrid residents has been affected by job losses and by austerity measures, including a rise in sales tax from 8% to 21% in 2012. The impact of the economic recession on spending patterns of Madrid households could be seen in a household survey in 2009: 74% said they were building up their savings, 54% were taking more advantage of sales, 47% were spending less on clothes, 44% on eating out and 42% on going to shows.

=== Composition of the economy by sector ===
The economy of Madrid has become based increasingly on the service sector. In 2011 services accounted for 85.9% of value added, while industry contributed 7.9% and construction 6.1%. Services to business, transport & communications, property & financial together account for 52% of total value added. Following the recession, services and industry were forecast to return to growth in 2014, and construction in 2015.

==== Services ====
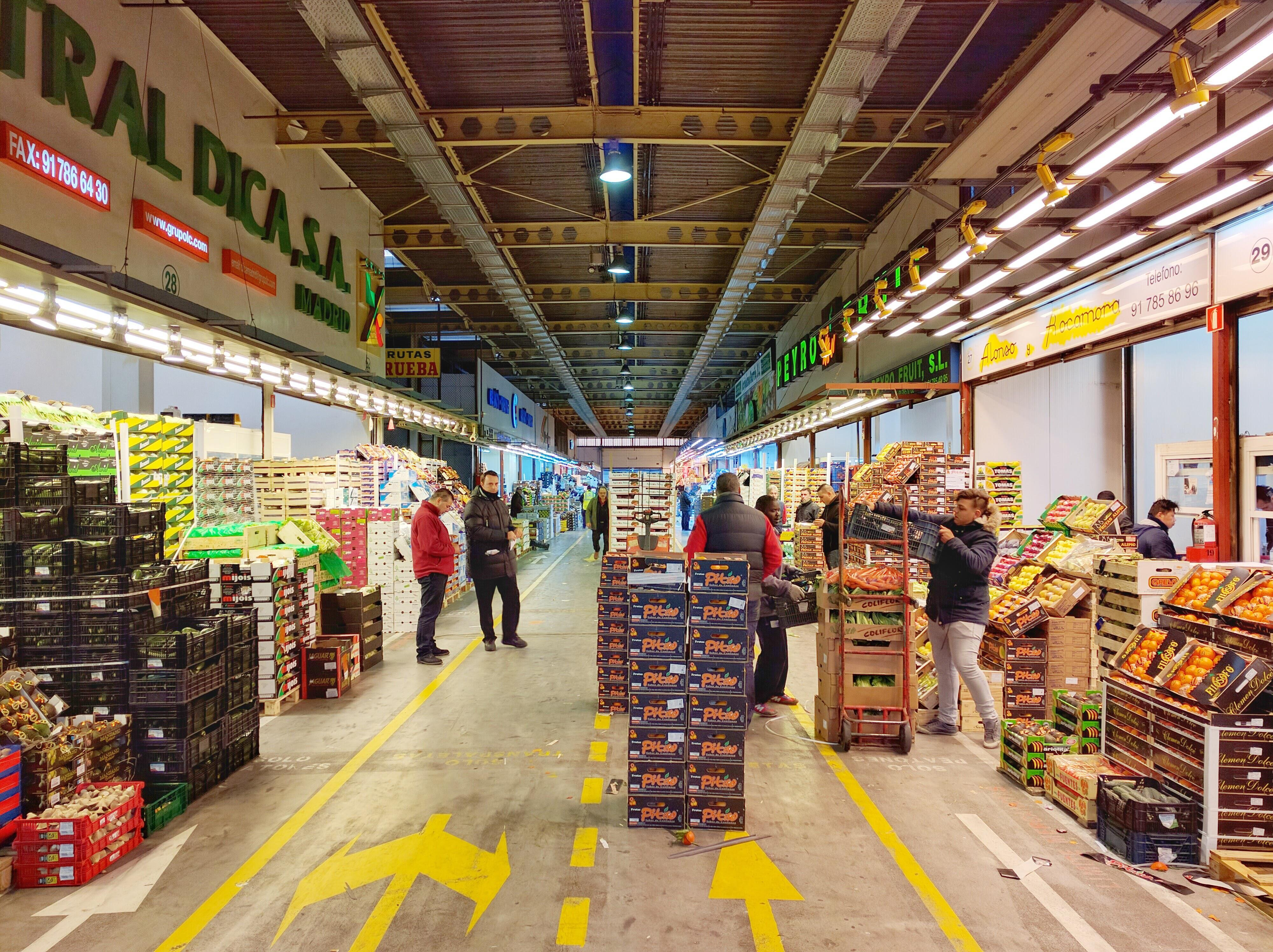
Mercamadrid, the biggest wholesale market of fresh products in Spain.

The historic dominance of the service sector in the capital is reflected in current trends, with the share of services in the city's economy growing from 82% in 2000 to 86% in 2011. The types of services that are now expanding are mainly those that facilitate movement of capital, information, goods and persons, and "advanced business services" such as research and development (R&D), information technology, and technical accountancy.

Contribution of services by sector to gross value added, Madrid 2009
Sector	% of total VA	% change 2000-09 in real terms
Services to business	14.5%	+2.8%
Transport & communication	14.3%	+33.3%
Property and rental	11.5%	+3.7%
Financial services	11.5%	-11.6%
Retail & repair	6.3%	+8.3%
Wholesale trade	5.4%	-9.0%
Hotel and catering	2.5%	-9.2%
Other private sector	19.5%	+3.0%
Public administration	5.8%	+7.1%
Health	3.9%	+16.2%
Education	3.1%	-10.5%
Recreational services	3.0%	-9.5%
Personal services	0.3%	-11.0%
Other public sector	3.3%	+10.8%

===== Finance and banking =====
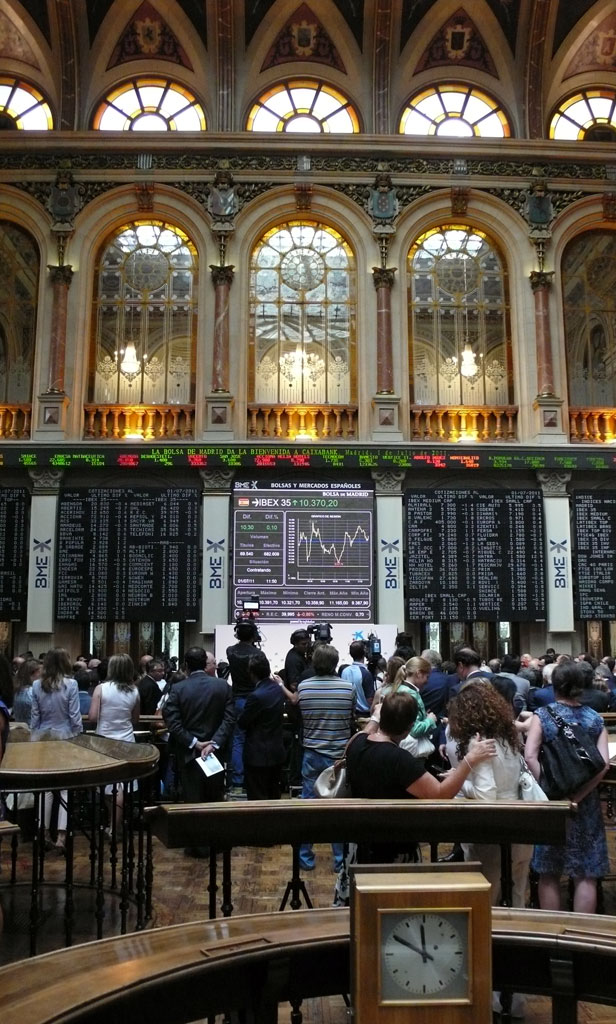
Madrid Stock Exchange

Banks based in Madrid, both clearing banks and savings banks, carry out 72% of the banking activity in Spain. After many recent amalgamations the largest banking groups with an important presence in Madrid are BSCH (Banco de Santander y Central Hispano) and BBVA (Banco Bilbao Vizcaya Argentaria). The Spanish central bank, Bank of Spain, has existed in Madrid since 1782. Stocks & shares, bond markets, insurance, and pension funds are other important forms of financial institution operating in the city.

===== Transport =====
The construction of transport infrastructure, such as the ring roads and train network, constituted a major pillar of the economy up to 2006. Road, rail and air links are vital to maintain the economic position of Madrid as a leading centre of employment, enterprise and tourism. Three quarters of a million people commute into the city to work. The road network within the metropolitan region includes nine radial autovías (fast dualled highways) and four orbital ones at different distances from the centre. Some of the more recently built radial roads where tolls are charged have not been used to capacity. The region now possesses a high-capacity metropolitan road network. However, in some of the outer areas the new orbital roads have favoured the dispersion and fragmentation of residential and economically active areas.

Madrid also has a high standard of public transport provision, consisting of the Metro, the cercanías local railways, and a dense network of bus routes, with many intermodal interchanges. Almost half of all journeys in the metropolitan area are made on public transport, a very high proportion compared with most European cities.

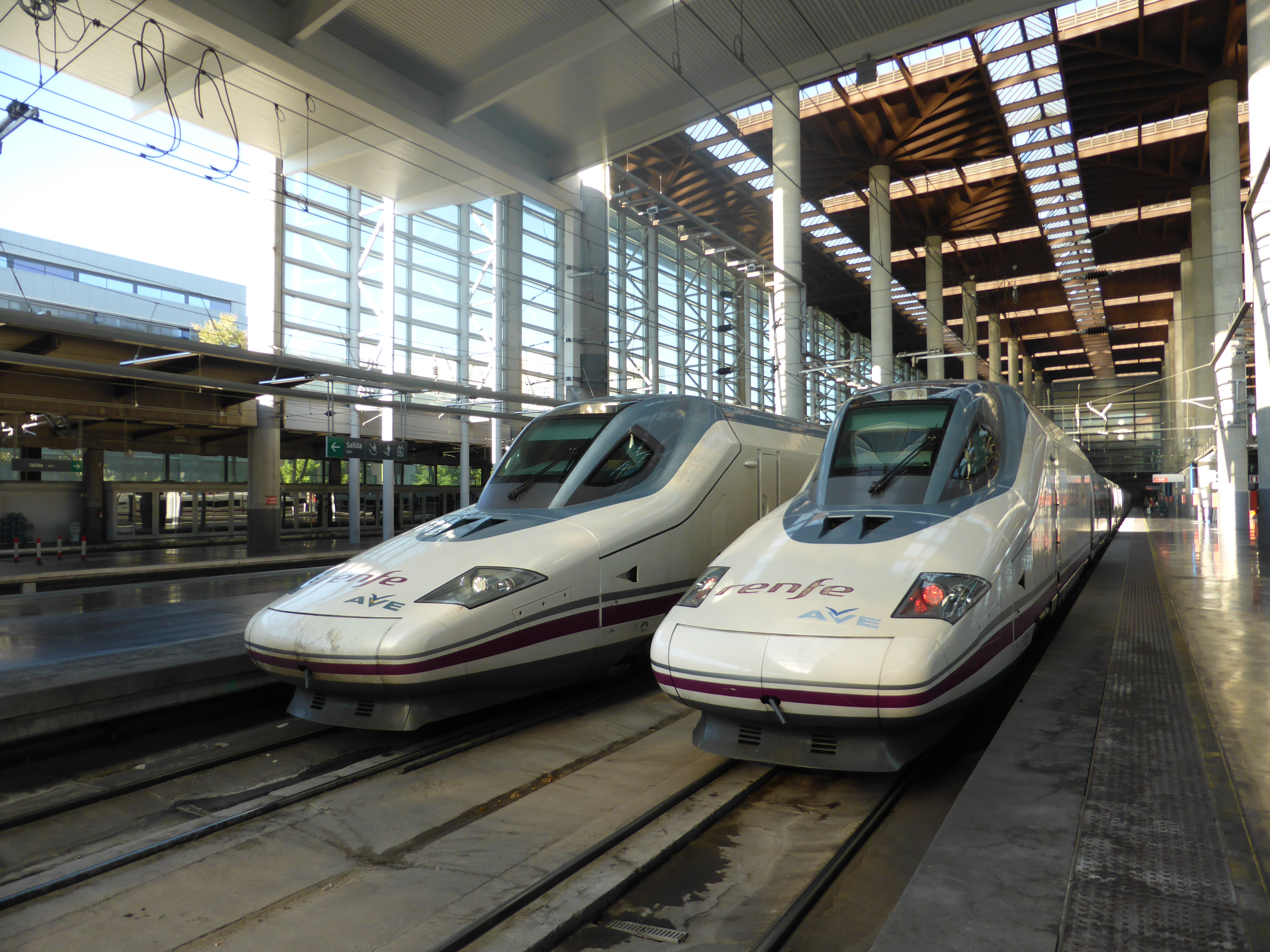
AVE trains at the Madrid Atocha Station

In terms of longer-distance transport, the construction of autovías in the 1980s and 1990s has given Madrid direct fast road links with most parts of Spain and with France and Portugal. Madrid is also the central node of the high-speed rail network (AVE), now connecting the city with 17 provincial capitals and with more under construction. High-speed rail has brought major cities such as Seville and Barcelona within 2.5 hours travel and has taken a large proportion of journeys that were formerly made by road or air. The economic importance of these developments lies not only in facilitating business trips but in increasing the city's access to human capital, strengthening the competitiveness of Madrid-based business.

Madrid-Barajas Airport, the fourth largest airport in Europe, is an important component of the city's economy, as a major transport hub, an arrival point for the large tourist trade, and a large employer. Barajas handles over 40M passengers annually, of whom 70% are international travellers, in addition to the majority of Spain's air freight movements.

Finally, Madrid's location at the centre of the peninsula makes it a natural logistical base and a focus of international trade. Over half by value of the national transport of goods and logistical operations passes through the Madrid region. This type of activity is gradually moving outwards from the city itself.

===== Trade fairs, exhibitions, conferences =====
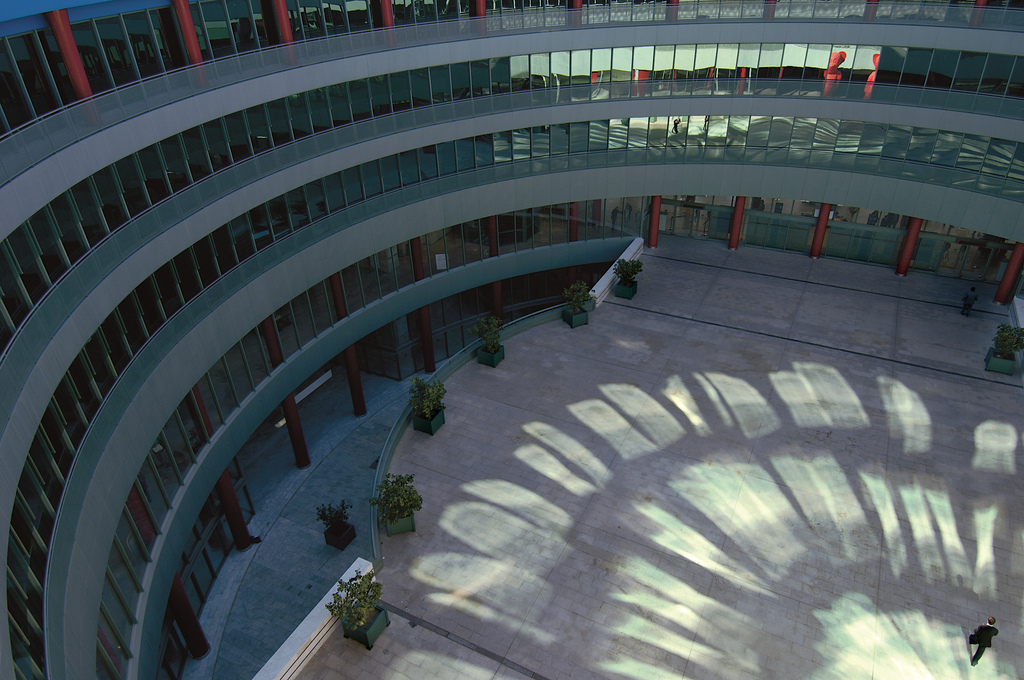
IFEMA exhibition centre

Madrid is an important centre for trade fairs, business exhibitions and conferences, although the scale of this activity decreased between 2005 and 2011: while there were more fairs (82) in the latter year, they attracted fewer exhibitors (32,800, down 18%) and fewer visitors (739,000, down 27%). Many of the trade fairs are coordinated by IFEMA, the Trade Fair Institution of Madrid. There are six conference and exhibition centres, and 64 hotels with conference & exhibition facilities.

===== Public sector =====
In 2012 there were 243,000 employees in the public sector, or 18.1% of all employees. This proportion had remained approximately stable since 2005. Of these employees 48% were working in administration and security, 22% in health, sanitary and social services, and 16% in education.

===== Tourism =====
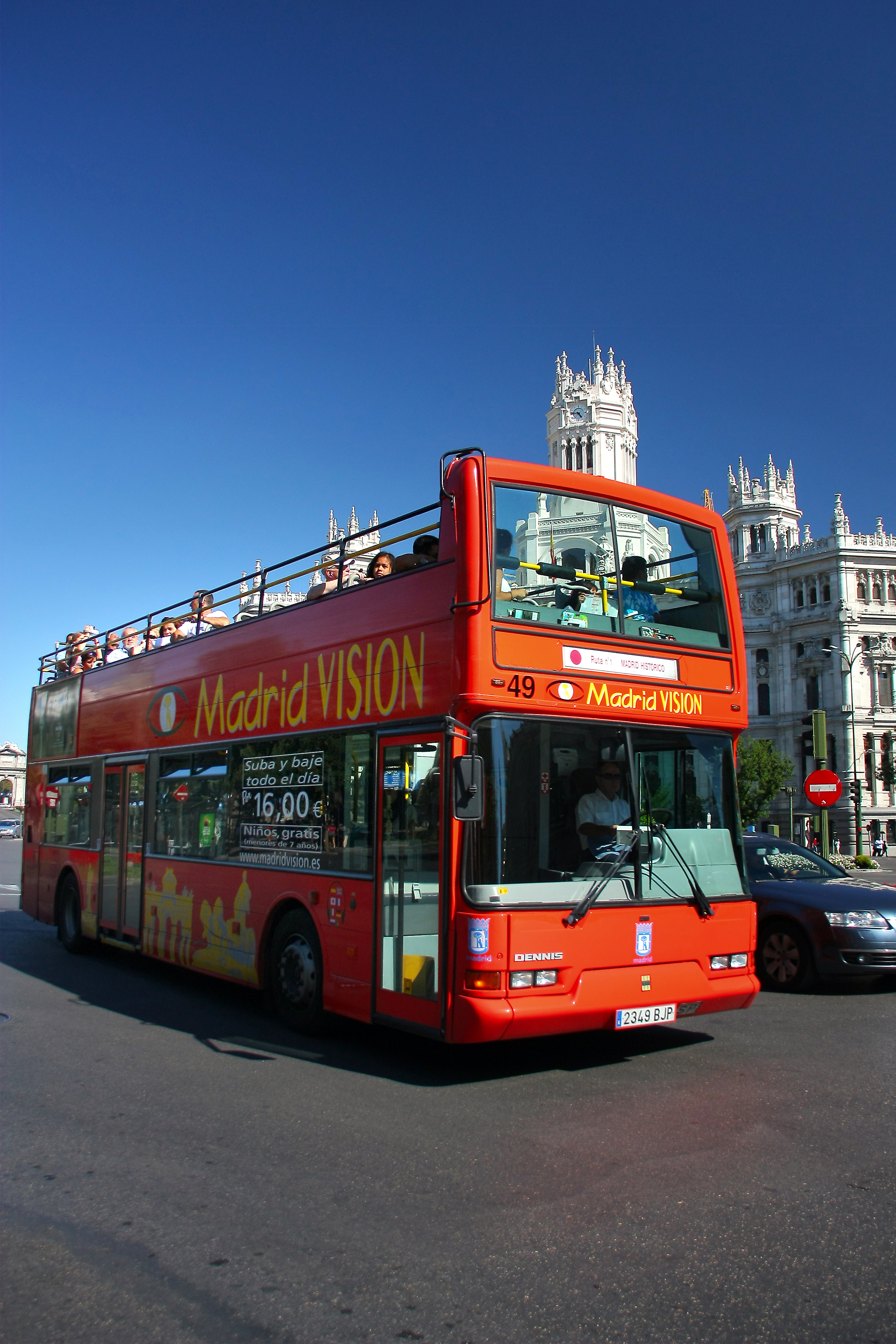
A tourist bus

Madrid attracts many tourists from other parts of Spain and from all over the world. There were 7.5 million visitors who stayed one or more nights in Madrid in 2013, 49% of whom were from outside Spain. As a tourist destination Madrid exceeds Barcelona as the most popular in Spain. Madrid is attractive to visitors for art and culture, architecture, gastronomy, shopping, shows, parks, sport and for its proximity to the Sierra de Guadarrama. There are over 900 hotels and hostels (24 of which are 5-star hotels) with accommodation for over 80,000 visitors. In 2012, 54% of foreign visitors were from Europe (especially Italy, UK and France), 12% were from the US, 20% from other parts of the Americas, and 14% from elsewhere. Spending by tourists in Madrid was estimated (2011) at €9,546.5M, or 7.7% of the city's GDP. Although visitor numbers were reported down by 10% in summer 2013, possibly due to high airport fees and fewer long-haul visitors after a merger between the airlines Iberia and British Airways, numbers had recovered by 12% year-on-year in the early months of 2014. "Madrid Precious Time" is a new collaborative body aiming at attracting more tourists to the city.

==== Industry ====
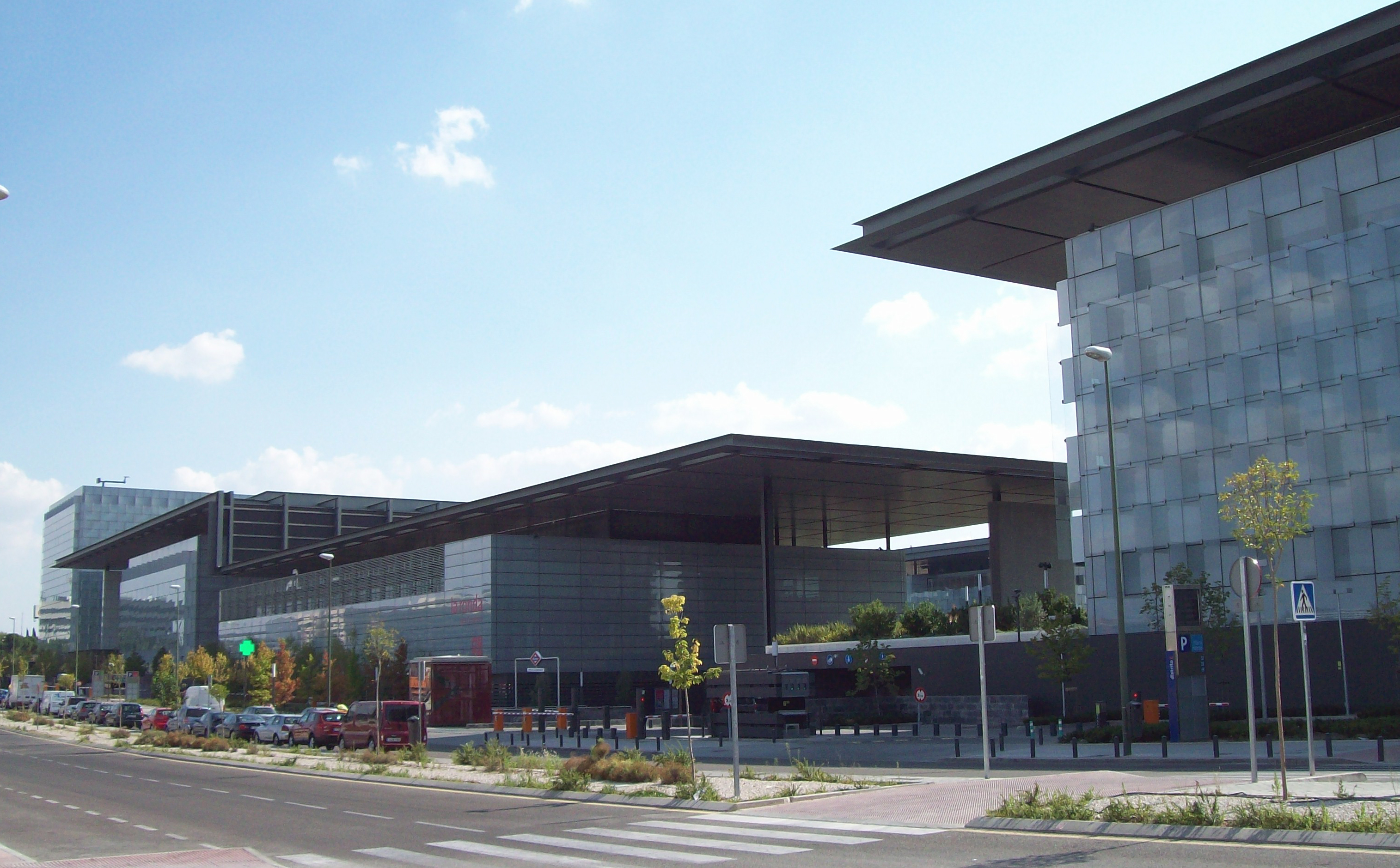
Telefónica district in Madrid

Industry still forms a significant sector, contributing 7.5% to Madrid's value-added in 2010. However, industry has slowly declined within the city boundaries as more industry has moved outward to the periphery, especially the south/south-eastern arc. The city now contains 37% (by value) of all industry in the region. Industrial Gross Value Added grew by 4.3% in the period 2003-2005, but decreased by 10% during 2008-2010.

The total GDP by industry in 2010 was €8,497M. The leading industries were: paper, printing & publishing, 28.8%; energy & mining, 19.7%; vehicles & transport equipment, 12.9%; electrical and electronic, 10.3%; foodstuffs, 9.6%; clothing, footwear & textiles, 8.3%; chemical, 7.9%; industrial machinery, 7.3%.

Madrid retains its advantages in infrastructure, as a transport hub, and as the location of headquarters of many companies. Industries based on advanced technology are acquiring much more importance here than in the rest of Spain.

==== Construction ====
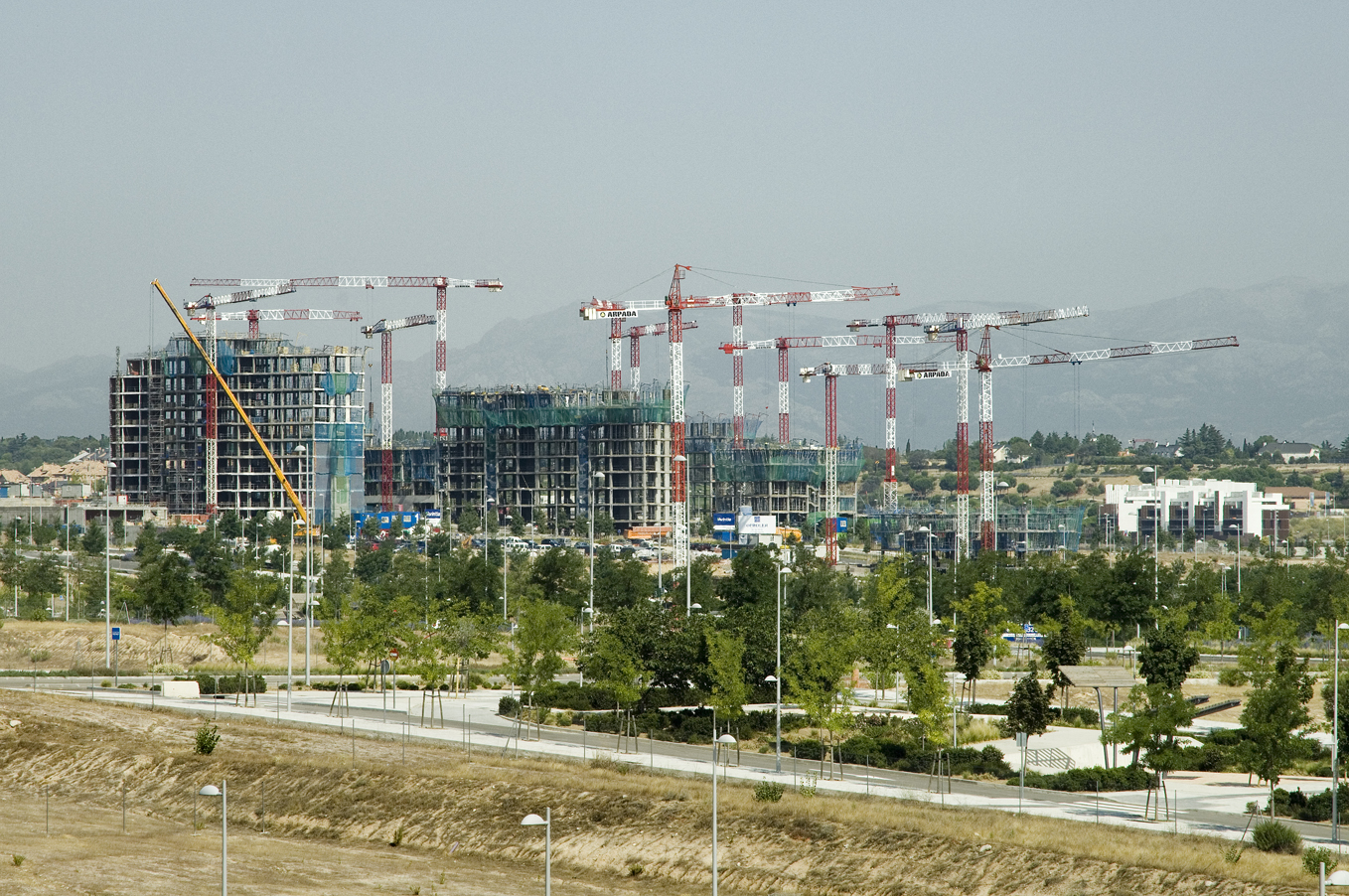
Building construction in Valdebebas.

The construction sector, contributing 6.5% to the city's economy in 2010, was a growing sector before the recession, aided by a large transport and infrastructure program. More recently the construction sector has fallen away and earned 8% less in 2009 than it had been in 2000. The decrease was particularly marked in the residential sector, where prices dropped by 25%-27% from 2007 to 2012/13 and the number of sales fell by 57%.

=== Employment ===
Participation in the labour force was 1,638,200 in 2011, or 79.0%: females 74.5%, males 83.9%. More women moved into the labour force between 2007 and 2011, their participation rate increasing by 4.2%, while that of men increased by only 0.4%. The employed workforce comprised 49% women in 2011 (Spain, 45%).

During the period 2007-11, the unemployment rate increased from 6.0% to 15.8% (similar in both sexes), remaining lower than in Spain as a whole (8.3% to 21.8%). Among those aged 16–24, the unemployment rate increased from 16.5% to 39.6% (Spain, 18.2% to 46.4%). Unemployment reached a peak of 19.1% in 2013, but with the start of an economic recovery in 2014, employment started to increase and more jobs were created in the city than in any other region of Spain. 47% of registered unemployed people receive unemployment benefit.

Employment continues to shift further towards the service sector, with 86% of all jobs in this sector by 2011, against 74% in all of Spain: during the preceding four years employment in Madrid decreased by 25% in industry and by 42% in construction, while in all services combined employment decreased by less than 6%, with increases of 11% in the transport & communication sector, and also 11% in public administration, education & health.

Employment by sector, Madrid 2011
Sector	Number of employees	%
Public administration, education and health	334,800	24.3%
Financial, property and business	266,000	19.3%
Transport & communication	179,600	13.0%
Trade & repair	164,500	11.9%
Hospitality	92,000	6.7%
Other services	150,600	10.9%
Manufacturing	91,500	6.6%
Energy & water	16,700	1.2%
Construction	78,400	5.7%
Other	5,600	0.4%

Among the economically active of Madrid in 2011, 41% were university graduates, against 24% for Spain as a whole. The unemployment rate among graduates was 8.9%, up from 3.8% in 2007 but much less than the 21.0% for those with only school education.

=== International rankings ===
A recent study placed Madrid 7th among 36 cities as an attractive base for business. It was placed third in terms of availability of office space, and fifth for each of access to markets, availability of qualified staff, mobility within the city, and quality of life. Its less favourable characteristics were seen as pollution, languages spoken, and political environment. Another ranking of European cities placed Madrid 5th among 25 cities (behind Berlin, London, Paris and Frankfurt), being rated favourably on economic factors and the labour market, and on transport and communication. Regarding tourism attraction, an international survey held by Mytraffic, Madrid's main commerce street "Gran Via" has been ranked 4th due to a 44% increase in pedestrian footfall. From the study we can highlight that the Gran Vía in Madrid is only surpassed by the Champs-Élysées Avenue in Paris with 102%, Leidsestraat in Amsterdam with 55%, and Via Corso in Rome with 49%.
