= 1979 Madrid municipal election =

Election in the Spanish municipality of Madrid

- 3 April 1979

All 59 seats in the City Council of Madrid 30 seats needed for a majority
- Registered: 2,378,941
- Turnout: 1,569,610 (66.0%)
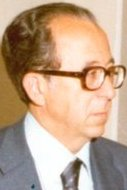

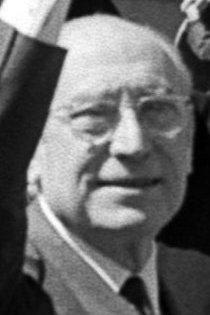

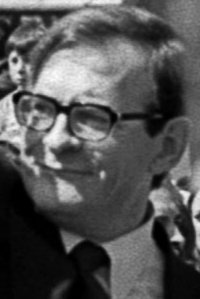
	First party	Second party	Third party
Leader	José Luis Álvarez	Enrique Tierno Galván	Ramón Tamames
Party	UCD	PSOE	PCE
Leader since	18 October 1978	26 November 1978	1979
Seats won	25	25	9
Popular vote	632,329	619,772	230,651
Percentage	40.3%	39.5%	14.7%
Mayor before election
Luis María Huete (acting)
UCD
Mayor after election
Enrique Tierno Galván
PSOE

A municipal election was held in Madrid on 3 April 1979 to elect the 1st City Council of the municipality. All 59 seats in the City Council were up for election. It was held concurrently with local elections all across Spain.

The Union of the Democratic Centre (UCD) emerged as the most voted party, but in a seat tie with the second force, the Spanish Socialist Workers' Party (PSOE), at 25 seats. As neither had an absolute majority of seats, it was up to the Communist Party of Spain (PCE) 9 seats to decide which party was to govern in Madrid.

Finally, an agreement between the PSOE and PCE resulted in Enrique Tierno Galván being named as the first democratically elected Mayor of Madrid.

== Overview ==
Under the 1978 Constitution, the governance of municipalities in Spain—part of the country's local government system—was centered on the figure of city councils (Spanish: ayuntamientos), local corporations with independent legal personality composed of a mayor, a government council and an elected legislative assembly. The mayor was indirectly elected by the local assembly, requiring an absolute majority; otherwise, the candidate from the most-voted party automatically became mayor (ties were resolved by drawing lots). In the case of Madrid, the top-tier administrative and governing body was the City Council of Madrid.

=== Date ===
The term of local assemblies in Spain expired four years after the date of their previous election. The election decree was required to be issued no later than the day after the expiration date of the assemblies, with election day taking place 65 days after the decree's publication in the Official State Gazette (BOE).

Elections to the assemblies of local entities were officially called on 27 January 1979 with the publication of the corresponding decree in the BOE, setting election day for 3 April.

=== Electoral system ===
Voting for local assemblies was based on universal suffrage, comprising all Spanish nationals over 18 years of age, registered and residing in the municipality and with full civil and political rights.

Local councillors were elected using the D'Hondt method and closed-list proportional voting, with a five percent-threshold of valid votes (including blank ballots) in each municipality. Each municipality was a multi-member constituency, with a number of seats based on the following scale:

Population	Councillors
<250	5
251–1,000	7
1,001–2,000	9
2,001–5,000	11
5,001–10,000	13
10,001–20,000	17
20,001–50,000	21
50,001–100,000	25
>100,001	+1 per each 100,000 inhabitants or fraction +1 if total is an even number

The law did not provide for by-elections to fill vacant seats; instead, any vacancies arising after the proclamation of candidates and during the legislative term were filled by the next candidates on the party lists or, when required, by designated substitutes.

== Parties and candidates ==
The electoral law allowed for parties and federations registered in the interior ministry, alliances and groupings of electors to present lists of candidates. Parties and federations intending to form an alliance were required to inform the relevant electoral commission within 10 days of the election call, whereas groupings of electors needed to secure the signature of a determined amount of the electors registered in the municipality for which they sought election, disallowing electors from signing for more than one list. In the case of Madrid, as its population was over 1,000,001, at least 5,000 signatures were required.

Below is a list of the main parties and alliances which contested the election:

Candidacy	Parties and alliances	Leading candidate	Ideology	Gov.	Ref.
UCD	List: Union of the Democratic Centre (UCD)	José Luis Álvarez	Centrism	Yes	
PSOE	List: Spanish Socialist Workers' Party (PSOE)	Enrique Tierno Galván	Social democracy	No	
PCE	List: Communist Party of Spain (PCE)	Ramón Tamames	Eurocommunism	No	

== Results ==
Summary of the 3 April 1979 City Council of Madrid election results →
Parties and alliances	Popular vote			Seats	
Parties and alliances	Votes	%	±pp	Total	+/−
Union of the Democratic Centre (UCD)	632,329	40.29	n/a	25	n/a
Spanish Socialist Workers' Party (PSOE)	619,772	39.49	n/a	25	n/a
Communist Party of Spain (PCE)	230,651	14.69	n/a	9	n/a
Workers' Revolutionary Organization (ORT)	37,396	2.38	n/a	0	n/a
Spanish Phalanx of the CNSO (FE–JONS)	25,038	1.60	n/a	0	n/a
Spanish Socialist Workers' Party (historical) (PSOEh)	5,317	0.34	n/a	0	n/a
Communist Unification of Spain (UCE)	5,251	0.33	n/a	0	n/a
Spanish Communist Workers' Party (PCOE)	5,241	0.33	n/a	0	n/a
Communist Movement–Organization of Communist Left (MC–OIC)	2,401	0.15	n/a	0	n/a
Socialist Party (PS)	2,298	0.15	n/a	0	n/a
Liberal Party (PL)	2,132	0.14	n/a	0	n/a
Revolutionary Communist League (LCR)	1,784	0.11	n/a	0	n/a
Blank ballots	0	0.00	n/a		
Total	1,569,610			59	n/a
Valid votes	1,569,610	100.00	n/a		
Invalid votes	0	0.00	n/a		
Votes cast / turnout	1,569,610	65.98	n/a		
Abstentions	809,331	34.02	n/a		
Registered voters	2,378,941				

Popular vote
UCD	40.29%
PSOE	39.49%
PCE	14.69%
ORT	2.38%
FE–JONS	1.60%
Others	1.56%
Blank ballots	0.00%

Seats
UCD	42.37%
PSOE	42.37%
PCE	15.25%

== Aftermath ==
=== Government formation ===
Investiture
Ballot →	19 April 1979	
Required majority →	30 out of 59	
Enrique Tierno Galván (PSOE): • PSOE (25); • PCE (9)	34 / 59	check
José Luis Álvarez (UCD): • UCD (25)	25 / 59	X mark
Abstentions/Blank ballots	0 / 59	
Absentees	0 / 59	

== Bibliography ==
- Decreto 1674/1963, de 11 de julio, por el que se aprueba el texto articulado de la Ley que establece un régimen especial para el Municipio de Madrid (PDF) (Decree 1674/1963). Official State Gazette (in Spanish). 11 July 1963. BOE-A-1963-14593.
- Ley 41/1975, de 19 de noviembre, de Bases del Estatuto de Régimen Local (Law 41/1975). Official State Gazette (in Spanish). 19 November 1975. BOE-A-1975-23920.
- Ley 39/1978, de 17 de julio, de elecciones locales (Law 39/1978). Official State Gazette (in Spanish). 17 July 1978. BOE-A-1978-18636.
- Constitución Española (Constitution). Official State Gazette (in Spanish). 27 December 1978 [version as of 29 December 1978]. BOE-A-1978-31229.
- Real Decreto 117/1979, de 26 de enero, de convocatoria de Elecciones Locales (Royal Decree 117/1979). Official State Gazette (in Spanish). 26 January 1979. BOE-A-1979-2570.
