= Mercamadrid =

Wholesale market of fresh products in Spain

Mercamadrid, S.A.

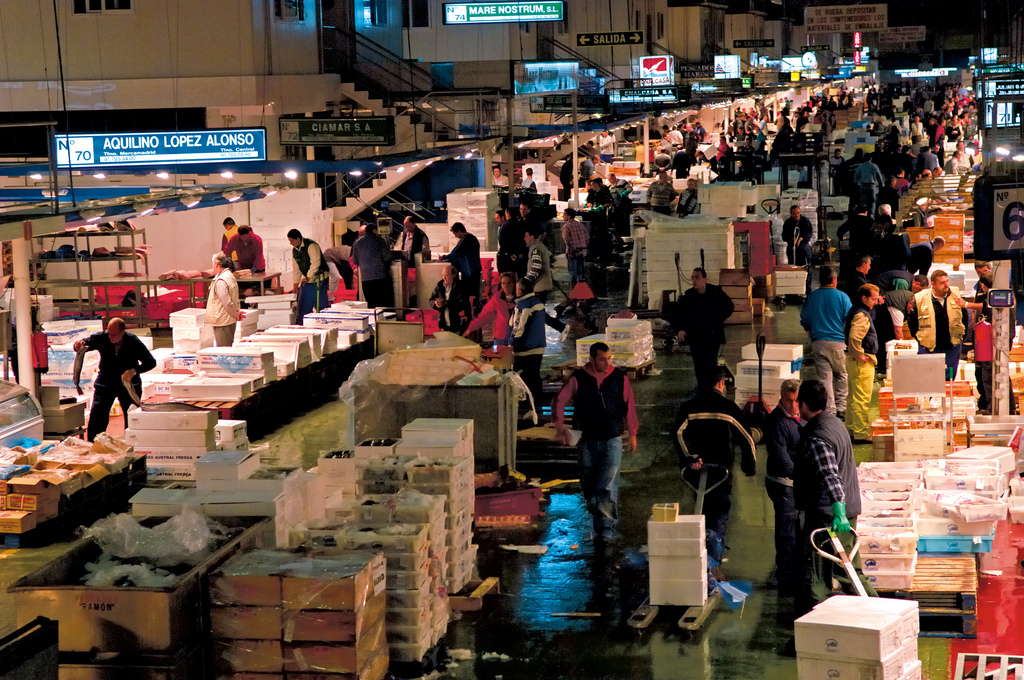
- Company type: sociedad anónima
- Headquarters: Avda. de Madrid Mercamadrid, Madrid
- Area served: Central Spain
- Owner: City Council of Madrid & Mercasa

Mercamadrid is the main wholesale market of fresh products in Spain. Located in Madrid, it is a public enterprise jointly participated by the Ayuntamiento de Madrid and Mercasa, part of the SEPI.

Located in Villa de Vallecas, next to the M-40, in Southeastern Madrid, it covers an area of 2.22 km^{2}. A dry land fish market, it is one of the biggest fish markets in the world. (Note: Sometimes mentioned as the second biggest after Tokyo's Tsukiji.) Serving an area of influence within a 500 km radius, it feeds roughly 12 million people. It has more than 9,000 employees operating through more than 800 companies.

It traces its origins back to 1982, when the Central Market of Fish was inaugurated. The Central Market of Fruits and Edible Plants soon followed (1983).
