= Inma Sanz =

Spanish politician

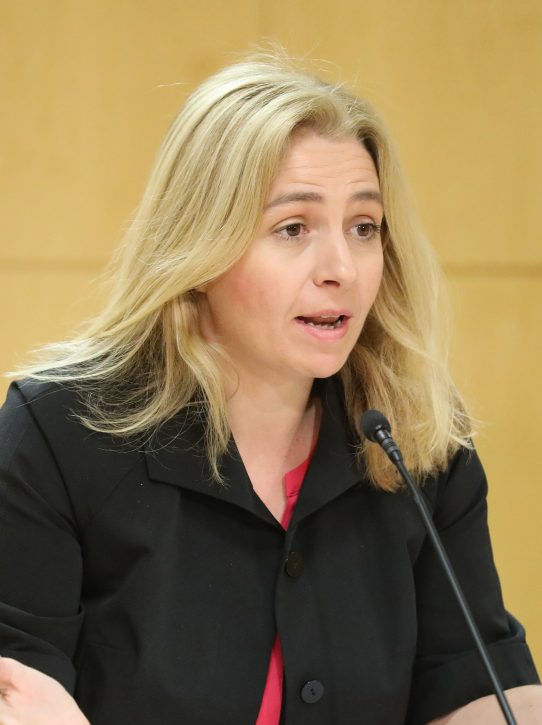

María Inmaculada Sanz Otero (born 18 June 1977) is a Spanish People's Party (PP) politician. She briefly served in the Assembly of Madrid in 2011. First elected to the City Council of Madrid in 2015, she became deputy mayor in 2019. She was the acting mayor of Madrid in April 2024 and again in July 2025.

== Biography ==
Born in Zamora, Castile and León, Sanz graduated in business management and administration form the Autonomous University of Madrid. She joined the New Generations of the People's Party (NNGG) in 1995.

In 2008, Sanz became Esperanza Aguirre's cabinet chief in the People's Party of the Community of Madrid. She was elected to the Assembly of Madrid in the 2011 elections, as 54th on a PP list that elected 72 members. She resigned a month later to take office as the Government of the Community of Madrid's director general of relations with the Assembly.

Sanz was fifth on the PP list for the 2015 Madrid City Council election, and was elected. In 2019, she ran the PP campaign and was third on the list as José Luis Martínez-Almeida of her party became mayor. She then became the council's spokesperson.

In the 2023 Madrid City Council election, Sanz was second on the PP list behind Almeida, and was named his deputy mayor when the PP retained power, after again leading his campaign. On 7 April 2024, she took over as acting mayor for Almeida's 15-day honeymoon. She was the third woman to be mayor of the capital of Spain, and the third person to hold the office temporarily.

On 3 July 2025, Almeida became a father for the first time at the age of 50. Sanz was again acting mayor for the six weeks of his paternity leave. He returned to office on 28 August.
