= City Council of Madrid =

Local government body in Spain

- Ayuntamiento de Madrid

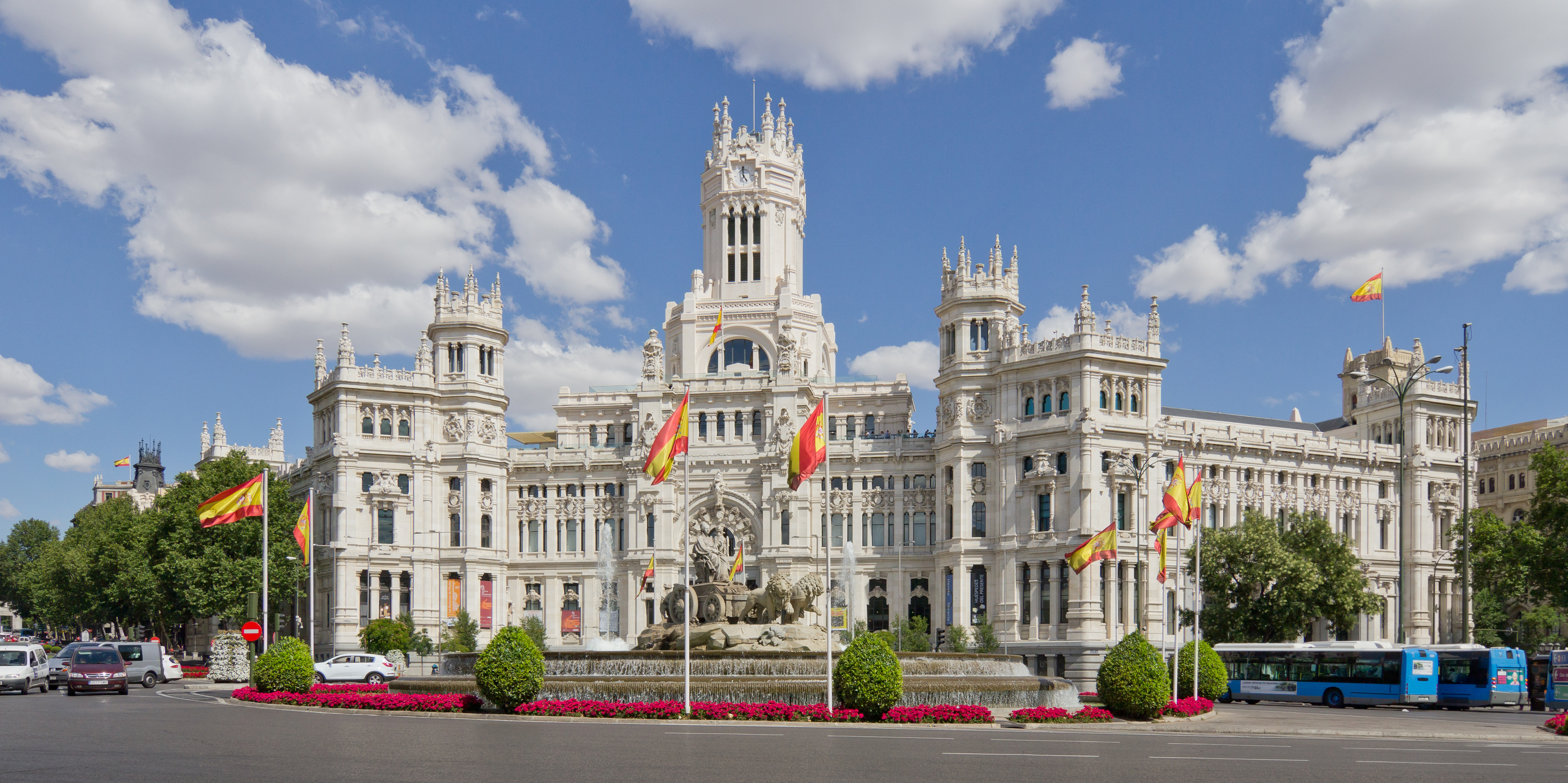
- The main facade of the City Hall, located at Plaza de Cibeles.

- Type: Ayuntamiento
- Headquarters: Cybele Palace, Plaza de Cibeles 1, Madrid, Spain
- Region served: Madrid
- Mayor: José Luis Martínez-Almeida (since 2019)

The City Council of Madrid (Spanish: Ayuntamiento de Madrid) is the top-tier administrative and governing body of Madrid, the capital and biggest city of Spain.

The city council is composed by three bodies: the mayor, who leads the city council and the executive branch of it; the governing council (Junta de Gobierno), which is the main body of the executive branch composed by the mayor and the councillors appointed by him; and the Plenary, a democratically elected assembly which represents the people of Madrid. The current mayor of Madrid is José Luis Martínez-Almeida since June 2019.

== Main bodies ==
=== Governing Council ===
The Junta de Gobierno of the City of Madrid is the executive branch of the city council, formed by the mayor and a group of councillors appointed by the mayor. The current board is composed of eight members:

Portfolio	Officeholder
Mayor	José Luis Martínez-Almeida
Deputy Mayor	Inma Sanz
Spokesperson	Inma Sanz
Security and Emergencies	Inma Sanz
Culture, Tourism and Sport	Marta Rivera de la Cruz
Economy, Innovation and Finance	Engracia Hidalgo Tena
Urban Development, Environment and Mobility	Borja Carabante
Housing	Álvaro González López
Families, Equality and Social Welfare	José Fernández Sánchez
Public Works and Equipment	Paloma García Romero

==== Districts ====
The local government of the city uses a decentralized system called juntas municipales de distrito (municipal district assemblies), which are ultimately led by the ayuntamiento. The Plenary is the body with authority to divide the city into districts, and the mayor has the authority to appoint the "councillor-presidents" chairing those districts. A councillor-president must be an elected councillor. The current officeholders are:

District	Councillor-President
Centro	Carlos Segura Gutiérrez
Salamanca	Cayetana Hernández de la Riva
Arganzuela	Dolores Navarro Ruiz
Chamartín	Yolanda Estrada Marín
Retiro	Andrea Levy
Tetuán	Paula Gómez-Angulo Amorós
Chamberí	Jaime González Taboada
Fuencarral-El Pardo	José Antonio Martínez Páramo
Moncloa-Aravaca	Borja Fanjul
Usera	Sonia Cea Quintana
Latina	Alberto González Díaz

District	Councillor-President
Hortaleza	David Pérez
Carabanchel	Carlos Izquierdo Torres
Puente de Vallecas	Ángel Niño Quesada
Moratalaz	Ignacio Pezuela Cabañes
Ciudad Lineal	Nadia Álvarez Padilla
Villaverde	Orlando Chacón Tabares
Villa de Vallecas	Carlos González Pereira
Vicálvaro	Ángel Ramos Sánchez
San Blas-Canillejas	Almudena Maíllo del Valle
Barajas	Juan Peña Ochoa

=== Plenary ===
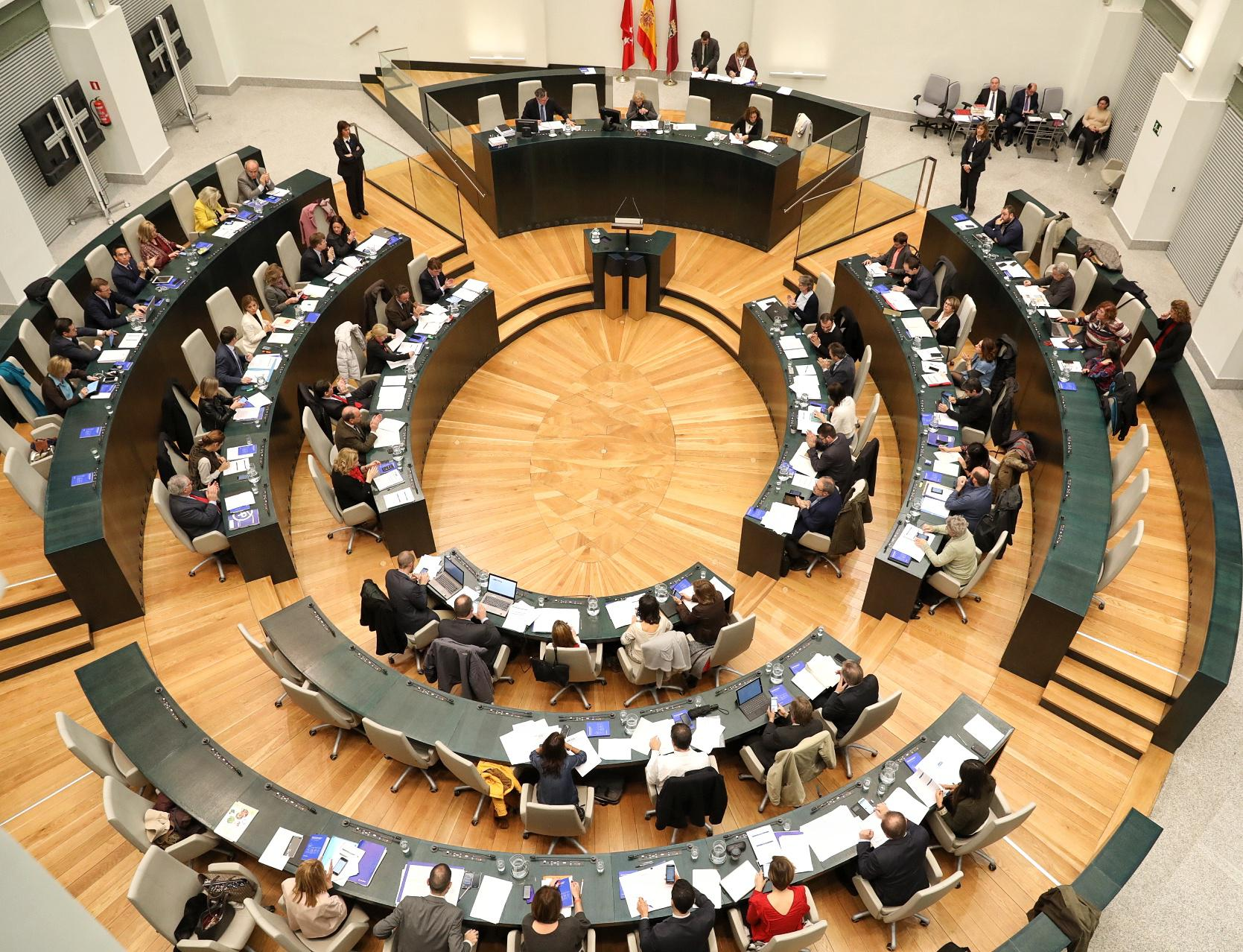
A plenary session

The Plenary is the body of maximum political representation of citizens in the municipal government, exercises the powers that are expressly assigned to it and is made up of the mayor and the councillors. The councillors are elected on the basis of universal suffrage in a secret ballot, and in turn they determine the mayor of Madrid. Plenary sessions are public. The Plenary can operate in committees, which will be formed by the councillors who designate the political groups in proportion to their representation in the Plenary.

The Plenary (Pleno del Ayuntamiento de Madrid) is the body formed by the elected councillors. The passing of by-laws, annual budget and taxes; the scrutiny of the council of government and the motion of no confidence on the mayor are tasks assigned to this entity in Spain.

The Plenary of the City Council of Madrid is formed by the following groups for the period 2023–2027:

2023–2027
Political party	Spokesperson	Councillors
People's Party	José Luis Martínez-Almeida	29
Más Madrid	Rita Maestre	12
Socialist Workers' Party	Reyes Maroto	11
Vox	Javier Ortega Smith	5

=== Mayor ===
The current mayor is José Luis Martínez-Almeida, from People's Party, invested on 15 June 2019 by an absolute majority of the Plenary (30 councillors) in a secret ballot among the councillors.

Investiture voting 15 June 2019
Mayor Candidates	Votes
José Luis Martínez-Almeida	30
Manuela Carmena	19
Pepu Hernández	8

== Elections ==
A list of elections since the restoration of the democratic system is presented as follows:

- 1979 Madrid City Council election
- 1983 Madrid City Council election
- 1987 Madrid City Council election
- 1991 Madrid City Council election
- 1995 Madrid City Council election
- 1999 Madrid City Council election
- 2003 Madrid City Council election
- 2007 Madrid City Council election
- 2011 Madrid City Council election
- 2015 Madrid City Council election
- 2019 Madrid City Council election
- 2023 Madrid City Council election

=== Results of the elections since 1979 ===
City councilors in the City Council of Madrid since 1979
Key to parties PCM UCD PSOE-CM CP IUCM CDS AP PPCM UPyD Cs AM MM Vox
Election	Distribution	Mayor
1979	9 / 25 / 25	Tierno Galván (PSOE) (1979-1986)
1983	4 / 30 / 23	Tierno Galván (PSOE) (1979-1986)
1987	3 / 24 / 8 / 20	Barranco (PSOE) (1986-1989)
1987	3 / 24 / 8 / 20	Rodríguez Sahagún (CDS) (1989-1991)
1991	6 / 21 / 30	Álvarez del Manzano (PP) (1991-2003)
1995	9 / 16 / 30	Álvarez del Manzano (PP) (1991-2003)
1999	5 / 20 / 28	Álvarez del Manzano (PP) (1991-2003)
2003	4 / 21 / 30	Ruiz-Gallardón (PP) (2003-2011)
2007	5 / 18 / 34	Ruiz-Gallardón (PP) (2003-2011)
2011	6 / 15 / 5 / 31	Ruiz-Gallardón (PP) (2003-2011)
2011	6 / 15 / 5 / 31	Botella (PP) (2011-2015)
2015	20 / 9 / 7 / 21	Carmena (AM) (2015-2019)
2019	19 / 8 / 11 / 15 / 4	Almeida (PP) (2019-current)
2023	12 / 11 / 29 / 5	Almeida (PP) (2019-current)

== Councillors ==
- List of Madrid councillors (2003–2007)
- List of Madrid councillors (2007–2011)
- List of Madrid councillors (2011–2015)
- List of Madrid councillors (2015–2019)
- List of Madrid councillors (2019–2023)

== City Hall ==
The City Hall is located at the Cybele Palace (Plaza de Cibeles, Retiro District), formerly known as Palacio de Comunicaciones. The city council began the process of moving from the Casa de la Villa (the former City Hall) to the Palacio de Comunicaciones in 2007.

== Municipal companies ==
The ayuntamiento, an entity with full legal personality, fully owns the following municipal companies: Madrid Destino, EMT Madrid, EMVS Madrid and the mortuary. It also has a participation in Mercamadrid, Madrid Calle 30 and the Club de Campo Villa de Madrid.

== Links ==
Media related to Madrid City Council at Wikimedia Commons

- City Council of Madrid
