= Andrea Levy (politician) =

Spanish politician

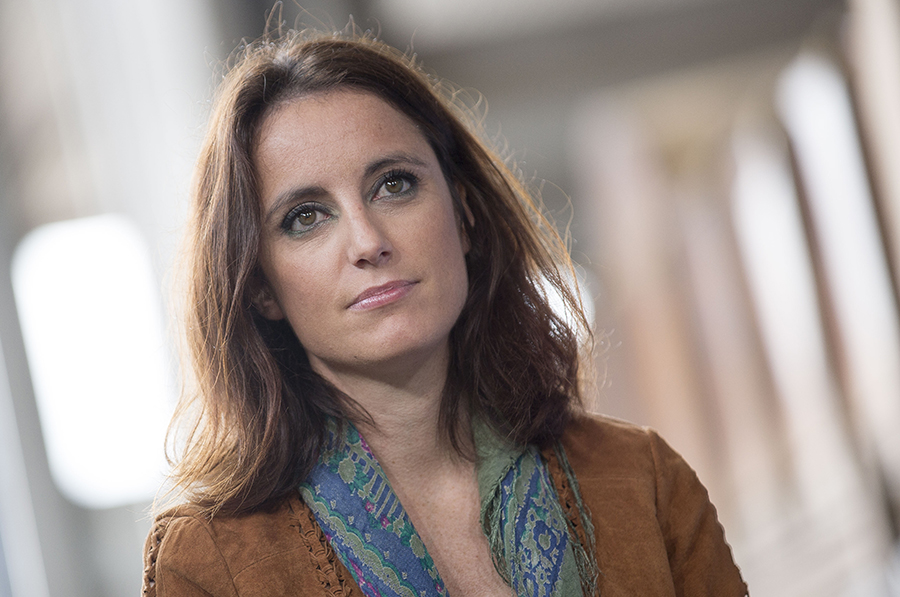
Andrea Levy in 2015

Andrea Levy Soler (born 3 May 1984) is a Spanish People's Party (PP) politician. She served in the Parliament of Catalonia from 2015 to 2019, and on the City Council of Madrid from 2019.

== Early and personal life ==
Levy was born in Barcelona. She is of Jewish descent through her father, though she was not raised in the Jewish culture or religion. She said of her surname "there are only more Cohens than Levys [in Judaism]. But [my family] are not practicing Jews".

An only child from a middle-class family, Levy was schooled at the Lycée Français de Barcelone and did a semester at Saint Martin's School of Art in London; she said she was inspired to join the latter institution by a reference to it in the Pulp song "Common People". She then studied at the International School of Protocol in Barcelona, and obtained a law degree from the University of Barcelona. She did an internship in the Ministry of Agriculture in the Generalitat de Catalunya under Socialist administration, and then joined the People's Party.

In September 2019, Levy was the first serving politician to appear on Telecinco's game show Pasapalabra. On the same channel five years later, she took part in a politicians' special of El rival más débil, the Spanish version of Weakest Link, and was the second contestant to be eliminated.

After having been mocked for slurring words in speeches, Levy publicly announced in February 2021 that she has fibromyalgia. Levy said in 2024 that she had been addicted to benzodiazepine.

== Political career ==
In 2011, Levy became the Vice Secretary of Communications for the New Generations of the People's Party in Catalonia and Vice Secretary of International Relations on a national basis for the group. The following year, People's Party of Catalonia president Alicia Sánchez-Camacho brought her into the party's parliamentary group as Vice Secretary of Studies and Programmes.

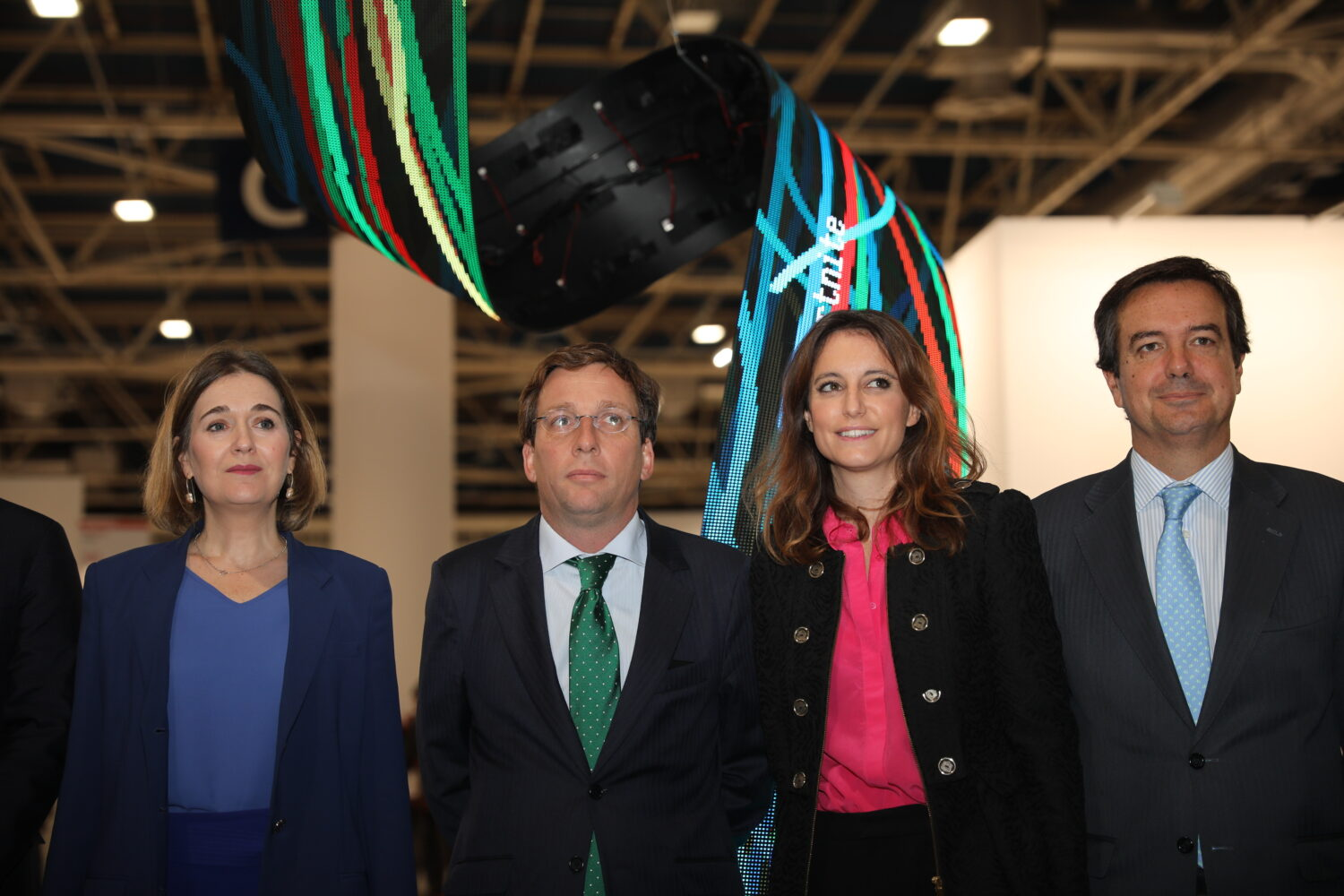
Levy (second from right) and mayor of Madrid José Luis Martínez-Almeida (second from left) in October 2019

The first election Levy ran in was the 2014 European Parliament election in Spain, being 39th on the PP's list. She was number two in the PP's list in Barcelona behind Xavier García Albiol in the 2015 Catalan regional election. In June 2015, PP leader and prime minister Mariano Rajoy named her Vice Secretary of Studies and Programmes; Pablo Casado, also in his early 30s, was brought in too. A year later, she was one of the negotiators between the PP and Citizens, who formed a coalition government after the June 2016 elections.

In 2018, Levy endorsed Casado as the PP's new leader after Rajoy was voted out of office. Sixth on the PP's list in the Madrid constituency, she was elected to the Congress of Deputies in the April 2019 Spanish general election, but relinquished her seat to María del Mar Blanco to instead run for the City Council of Madrid.

In the May 2019 elections, Levy was elected to the council in Spain's capital city as second on the PP's list behind incoming mayor José Luis Martínez-Almeida. She was made the councillor in charge of culture, sport and tourism. In July 2021, during her time in office, the city was made a UNESCO World Heritage Site.
