= Elena González-Moñux =

Spanish politician

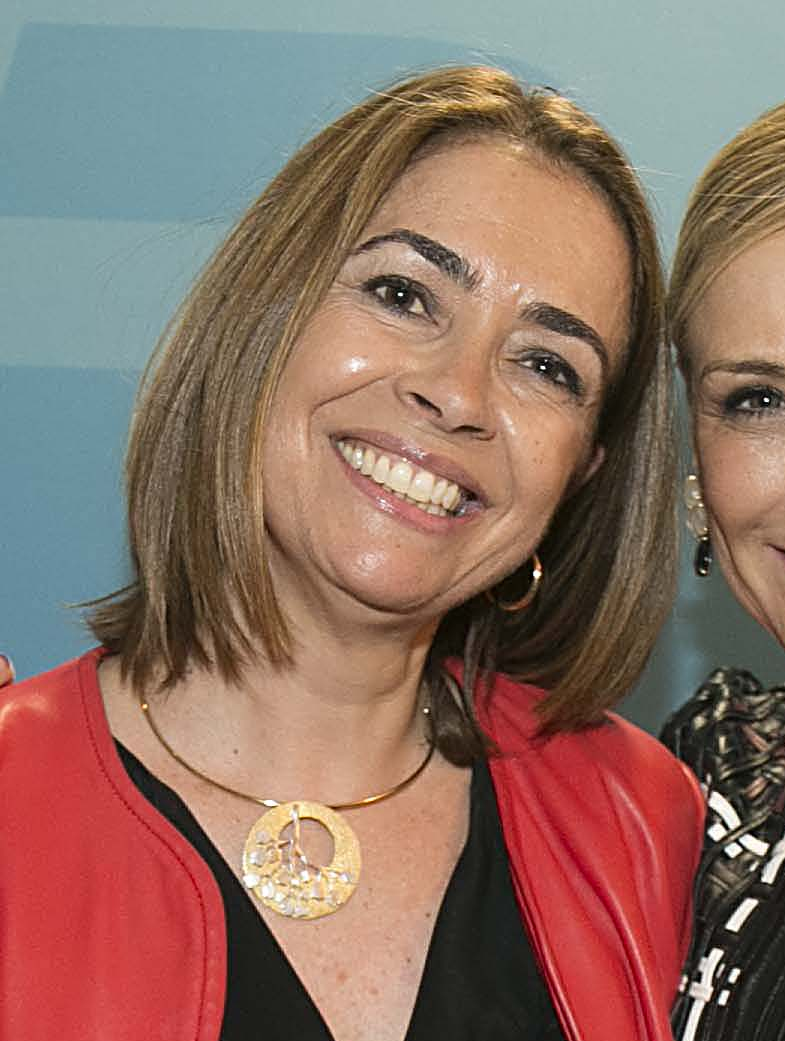
- During the inauguration of the PP headquarters in Fuencarral-El Pardo in April 2016

Member of the Assembly of Madrid
- In office 9 June 2015 – 1 September 2017

Madrid city councillor
- In office 14 June 2003 – 31 January 2012

Member of the Assembly of Madrid
- In office 30 June 1999 – 1 April 2003

Personal details
- Born: 26 November 1962 (age 62); Madrid
- Citizenship: Spanish
- Political party: People's Party
- Occupation: Politician, legal advisor

Elena González-Moñux Vázquez (born 1962) is a Spanish politician member of the People's Party. She has been member of the Madrid City Council and the Assembly of Madrid.

== Biography ==
Born on 26 November 1962 in Madrid. She graduated in law at the Autonomous University of Madrid (UAM). She worked as legal advisor for several companies before entering politics.

González Moñux ran as candidate in the People's Party (PP) list for the 1999 regional election in Madrid. She became a member of the regional legislature in its 5th term (1999–2003).

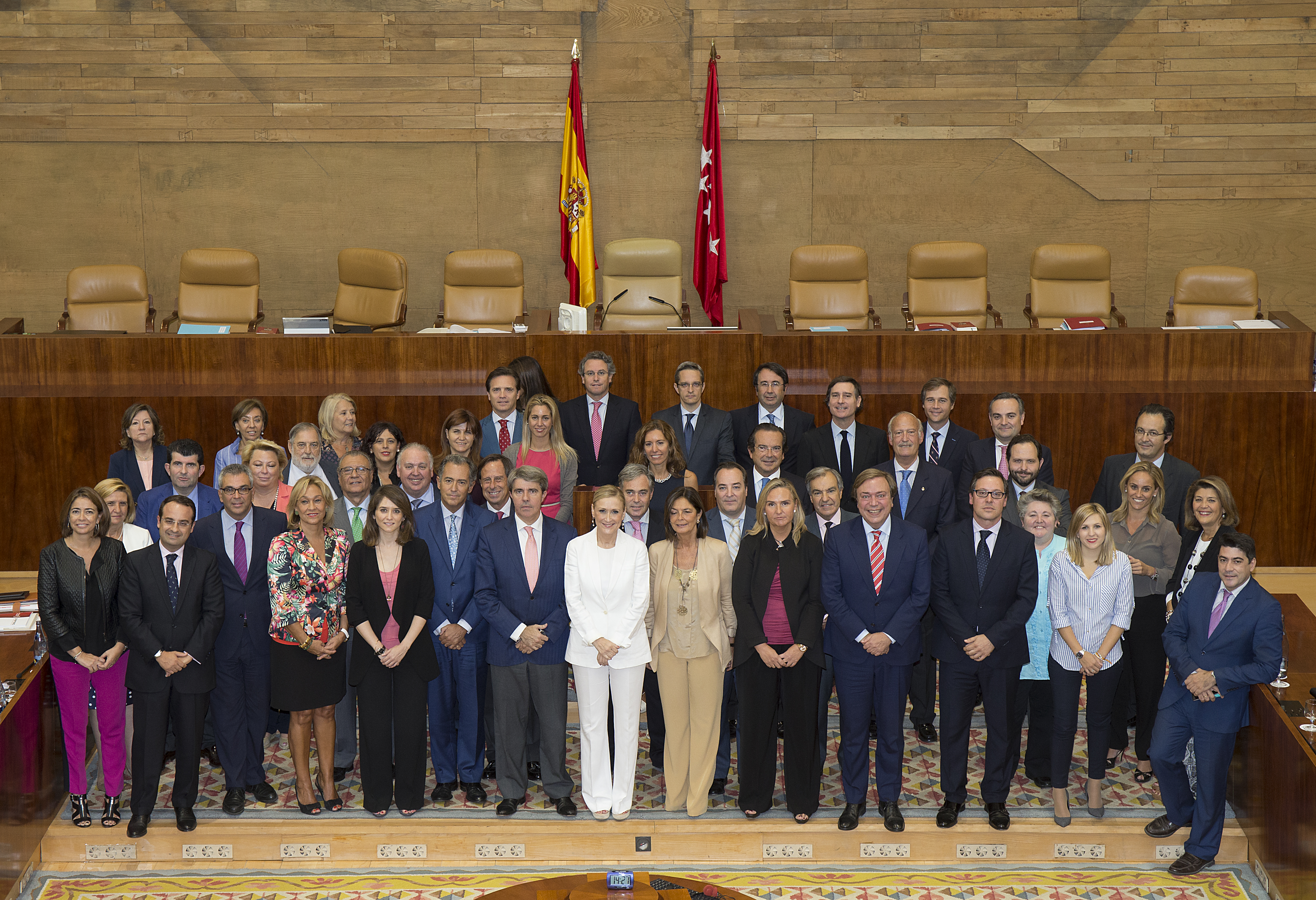
González-Moñux along the members of her parliamentary group. Both González-Moñux and Ossorio are in the first row; González-Moñux the 1st starting on the left and Ossorio the 6th.

Following the 2003 Madrid municipal election, she became a city councillor of the Spanish capital, serving as councillor-president of the Retiro district for that term. She renovated her seat as city councillor in the 2007 and 2011 elections. In her second term she served as councillor-president of the Fuencarral-El Pardo district. She terminated her third term as member of the city council early, as she was appointed as Vice-Minister of Justice and Public Administrations of the regional government then presided by Esperanza Aguirre in 2012.

She also presided the Fuencarral-El Pardo PP aggrupation. She returned to the Assembly of Madrid in 2015, after being elected in the regional election.

In November 2016 Moñux-Vázquez filed a report on the spokesman of her parliamentary group, Enrique Ossorio, alleging she had suffered "a constant, humiliating and degrading treatment" inflicted on her by Ossorio. The mobbing accusation was dismissed in January 2017 by the judicial authorities.

She finally formalised her renunciation to the parliamentary seat on 1 September 2017. Since November 2016, she had been in a sick leave due to depression, only attending two plenary sessions: to vote against the amendments to the budget and another voting on 22 June. She was then appointed the new director general of the Energy Foundation of the Community of Madrid (Fenercom) by the regional government.
