= Alberto Ruiz-Gallardón =

Spanish politician

The Most Excellent Alberto Ruiz-Gallardón OSRP CNM
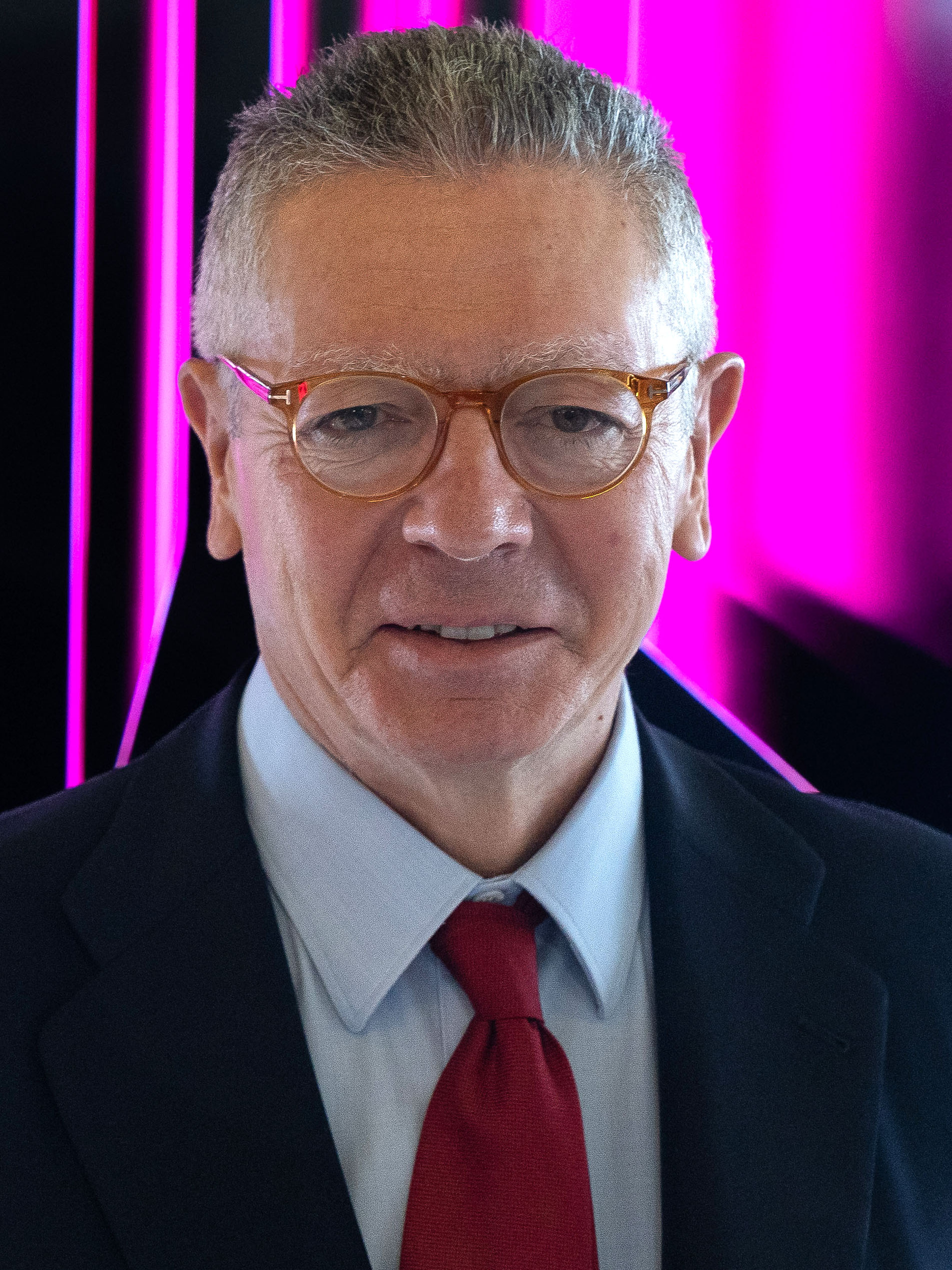

Minister of Justice First Notary of the Kingdom
- In office 22 December 2011 – 23 September 2014
- Prime Minister: Mariano Rajoy
- Preceded by: Francisco Caamaño Domínguez
- Succeeded by: Soraya Sáenz de Santamaría (acting)

Mayor of Madrid
- In office 23 June 2003 – 22 December 2011
- Deputy: Manuel Cobo
- Preceded by: José María Álvarez del Manzano
- Succeeded by: Ana Botella Serrano; Manuel Cobo (interim)

President of the Community of Madrid
- In office 30 June 1995 – 8 November 2003
- Monarch: Juan Carlos I
- Preceded by: Joaquín Leguina
- Succeeded by: Esperanza Aguirre

Member of the Congress of Deputies
- In office 13 December 2011 – 24 September 2014
- Constituency: Madrid

Member of the Senate
- In office 28 July 1987 – 4 July 1995
- Constituency: Madrid

Member of the Assembly of Madrid
- In office 10 June 1987 – 25 May 2003

Member of the Madrid City Council
- In office 23 May 1983 – 10 June 1987
- In office 14 June 2003 – 22 December 2011

Personal details
- Born: Alberto Ruiz-Gallardón Jiménez; 11 December 1958 (age 67) Madrid, Spain
- Party: People's Party
- Spouse: Maria del Mar Utrera
- Children: 4
- Education: San Pablo CEU University
- Profession: Public Prosecutor, Lawyer

Alberto Ruiz-Gallardón Jiménez (born 11 December 1958) is a Spanish politician and former Minister of Justice. He was mayor of Madrid between 2003 and 2011. A stalwart of the conservative People's Party (PP), he has previously been a leading figure in various local and national legislative bodies. In December 2011 Ruiz-Gallardón was appointed Minister of Justice in Mariano Rajoy's inaugural cabinet. He resigned in September 2014.

== Early life and education ==
Ruiz-Gallardón was born in Madrid. His father, José María Ruiz Gallardón, was a member of the leadership of the People's Alliance (AP), precursor to the present-day People's Party. He attended secondary school in Madrid at the Jesuit School Nuestra Señora del Recuerdo, and then studied law at the Universidad San Pablo CEU.

He is married to María del Mar Utrera, who is the daughter of José Utrera Molina, a former Minister of the Franco regime. They have four sons: Alberto, José, Ignacio and Rodrigo.

Alberto Ruiz-Gallardón is a cousin of Trinidad Jiménez, the former Foreign Affairs Minister of Spain, and Cécilia Attias, former First Lady of France. He is the great-grandchild of the composer Isaac Albéniz.

== Political life ==
As a lawyer, Ruiz-Gallardón sat for exams to begin a career as a prosecutor at the age of 23. He attained the position, ranking second in the twenty eighth year. He was given a position in the Málaga Provincial Court, where he served for a short time until given leave to take charge of the party's legal counsel.

In May 1983 he was elected to Madrid city council. In February 1986, at the party's Seventh National Congress, he joined its executive committee. In the same year, he ran unsuccessfully as a Senate candidate for Palencia in the general elections but finished fifth, 301 votes behind the successful PSOE candidate, in a district where four candidates were elected. In the aftermath, the secretary general of his party, Jorge Verstrynge, retired and Ruiz-Gallardón became the interim secretary general until the Party Congress could convene.

His next political position was in December 1986, when the regional leadership of AP in Madrid nominated him as candidate for the presidency of the Autonomous Community of Madrid with no eventual success. In February 1987, the Eighth Extraordinary Congress of the AP appointed Antonio Hernández Mancha as chairman. Ruiz-Gallardón left his interim general secretary position and was named one of the four vice-chairmen of the party.

Ruiz-Gallardón was elected Deputy of the Madrid Assembly on 10 June 1987. Only one month later, he was elected to the Senate in the delegation designated by the Madrid Assembly and named spokesman of the AP Parliamentary Group body. On 22 October 1988 Ruiz-Gallardón resigned his party positions as the result of a misunderstanding with chairman Mancha over an agreement with the Democratic and Social Centre (Spain) regarding Assembly rules. At the party's Ninth Congress in January 1989, Mancha was replaced as chairman by Manuel Fraga. The party was re-founded as the People's Party (PP), and Ruiz-Gallardón was appointed to the National Executive Committee and became president on the Committee for Conflicts and Discipline.

Following the general elections on 29 October 1989, Ruiz-Gallardón continued serving as a senator for Madrid and, as in the previous legislature, headed the PP Parliamentary Group in the Senate. He returned to the PP's National Executive Committee at the Tenth Congress, this time with José María Aznar as party chairman. He also retained his position as president of the Committee on Conflicts. In April 1990, he headed an internal investigation of the Caso Naseiro. This investigation resulted in the expulsion of several party officials.

First among his party's candidates for the Senate in Madrid in the general elections of 6 June 1993, Ruiz-Gallardón was once again elected to the Senate. He continued as Spokesman of the PP Parliamentary Group, and subsequently resigned his corresponding position in the Madrid Assembly.

== President of the Community of Madrid ==
On 28 May 1995 Ruiz Gallardón ran for the presidency of the Community of Madrid on a PP ticket, securing a majority of seats in the Assembly for the first time. He was elected President of the Community of Madrid by the Madrid Assembly one month later. Ruiz Gallardón ran for re-election in the 1999 elections, again securing a majority of seats.

During his tenure as regional president, Ruiz Gallardón garnered a high degree of popularity, because of his apparently moderate attitude, especially compared to several leaders of his party. Following José María Aznar's announcement that he would not seek re-election as Prime Minister in 2004, Gallardón was one of the PP leaders that were mentioned as a possible successor by the mainstream media.

== Mayor of Madrid ==
Encouraged by the Prime Minister José María Aznar, Gallardón became the PP's candidate for the Madrid mayoral election of 2003. He was successful in his bid, obtaining a majority of the votes. One of his first decisions was to increase city taxes as a means to back his future plans for the city.

Nicknamed ironically the "Pharaoh" by many locals, the mayor has created an urban renewal plan for Madrid that included the undergrounding of parts of the M30 motorway, the redevelopment of the Manzanares River bank, a push for the virtual gentrification of dwindling historic downtown areas, and a reform of the existing finance laws. In fact, the Madrid bid for the 2012 Summer Olympics figured as the most ambitious component of his plan despite being planned by his predecessor, José María Álvarez del Manzano. Several other projects, such as the four skyscrapers under construction in the old training grounds of Real Madrid, have boosted his urban plans.

In May 2006, Baroness Carmen Cervera publicly demonstrated against his plan to reform Paseo del Prado, as the baroness feared for the effects on her co-managed Museo Thyssen-Bornemisza.

During Ruiz-Gallardón's tenure as mayor, the Madrid City Council in 2005 approved the establishment of a Holocaust memorial in Juan Carlos I Park. Ruiz-Gallardón then attended its dedication in March 2007.

== 2008 developments ==
Ruiz-Gallardón had been considered as a leading candidate for the future leader of the PP, his moderate views making him one of the most popular politicians in the opinion polls, rivalling the president of the Community of Madrid, Esperanza Aguirre, in the leadership race. In the period leading up to the 2008 general election, Ruiz-Gallardón announced his intention to be placed in the Madrid (Spanish Congress Electoral District) congressional list of the PP. Being a mayor, his inclusion in the list would have been an exceptional move as the Party by-laws ban mayors of cities with over 100,000 inhabitants from running for the Congress of Deputies. This move was not approved by Aguirre who announced her intention to resign as President of Madrid in order to run for National Deputy as well (Members of the regional legislatures are barred from the Cortes Generales). On 15 January 2008 Mr Rajoy (leader of the PP) announced that Mr. Gallardón would not be included in the PP lists for General Elections. Mrs. Aguirre had won the intense internal battle with Mr. Gallardón. Following this announcement, Mr. Ruiz-Gallardón indicated his intention to retire from politics, although the next day he softened his response, and said he will "reflect" on his political future after the March 2008 General Elections.

== Third term. Mayor and deputy ==
Alberto Ruiz-Gallardón again won an absolute majority of 31 seats out of 57 in Madrid City Council in the municipal elections of 2011, defeating the socialist candidate Jaime Lissavetzky, who had been State Secretary for sports until then. IU increased its representation from 5 to 6 seats, PSOE lost 3 of its 18 seats and UPyD, that won 5 seats, become a member of the Madrid City Council for the first time in its history.

Ruiz-Gallardón was elected Deputy to Congress for Madrid in the Spanish general election of 2011. He was placed 4th on the People's Party list of candidates, choosing to be fourth on the list as a tribute to his father, who had occupied the same place. Alongside Ruiz-Gallardón, other 18 members of that list won a seat in the Spanish Congress of Deputies.

== Minister of Justice ==
On 21 December 2011 he was appointed Minister of Justice by Mariano Rajoy, to form part of the first government of the PP after its victory in the general elections held on 20 November 2011. On the same day he was appointed Minister, on 22 December 2011, he left his office as Mayor of Madrid, being replaced ad interim by the deputy mayor, Manuel Cobo. On 27 November 2011, with 31 votes for, the Plenary of the Council elected Ana Botella as his successor.

At his first Parliamentary appearance as Minister of Justice, he announced his intention to reform the abortion law approved by the previous Zapatero government, a law based on time limits, the same as the ones existing in most European countries, widely criticized by the Catholic Church and by the People's Party (in particular in relation to the group comprising young people aged about 16–18 years, who could legally get an abortion despite the opposition of their parents) to return to the 1985 law, by which a woman had to invoke some reason to justify her decision.

He also announced his intention to change the way the 12 judges called vocales of the General Council of the Judiciary were elected, returning to the old direct election system by the judges, dropped in 1995 (with a slight modification passed in 2001 during the former PP government, headed by José María Aznar, thanks to the consensus reached with the PSOE, that established the election by the Courts from a list of 31 candidates submitted by the associations of judges) because the 12 vocales were filled up with only one association of judges, the prevalent and conservative Professional Association of Magistrates.

As regards the Same Gender Marriage law, introduced by the former socialist government in 2004 to legalize gay and lesbian couples marriage, very criticized by the Catholic Church and by the People's Party, that join the demonstrations promoted "in defense of the family", Ruiz Gallardón said that the government would await the decision of the Constitutional Court about the appeal lodged by the People's Party as soon as the law was passed by the Courts.

On 30 May 2012, the government announces the approval of a draft law, developed by the Ministry of Justice, by which court fees will be raised between 50 and 750 euros. Its purpose is, according to the government, to alleviate the saturation of the courts and, at the same time, to assume the costs of legal aid, as well as to prevent conflicts that could be resolved through other means reach the courts. But, according to the opposition, this rise restricts the access of both middle-income and low-income citizens to judicial administration. The highest increases were registered in the area of the "second instance", in order, according to the government, to reduce the actions that seeks solely to prolong the procedure, as well as to reduce the burden on judicial organs. Thus, appeals in civil and contentious-administrative matters rises to 500 euros and the matching processes in those same areas are increased from 600 to 1200 euros. With respect to the Labour Court, appeal and cassation cases, which until now were free, will have charges of 500 and 700 euros, respectively.

As for the complaint brought by José Manuel Benítez, member of the General Council of the Judiciary, against his president, Carlos Dívar, for suspected misusing of public funds (he would have spent about 6000 euros on travels to Puerto Banús and hotels, fact that he did not deny, but alleged its official character) finally dismissed, Ruiz Gallardón opposed the petition for the appearance of Dívar before the Congress of Deputies, filed by IU (and also subscribed by the PSOE at the last minute), alleging that there is no reason why the president of the CGDG has to go to the Parliament, because the Parliament is not competent to exercise the political control over the government body of the judiciary, but that the responsibilities of the members of the judiciary must only be required within the General Council of the Judiciary itself.

In November 2012, Gallardón justified the Government's amnesty to four members of the Catalan police forces stating that "the right of pardon is power of the Government". The four policeman had previously been judged and found guilty of torturing a citizen, and sentenced to four years in prison each.

On 23 September 2014 he resigned as Minister of Justice and announced his retirement from politics. His decision came after his controversial bill on abortion had been rejected by the Prime Minister of Spain, Mariano Rajoy. He also renounced to his parliamentary seat at the Congress of Deputies. The vacant seat was taken by Valentina Martínez Ferro.

== Lezo case ==
On 26 April 2018, he was imputed by the judge for his involvement in the corruption scandal Case Lezo, which involves leaders of the PP in the Community of Madrid. One year later, on 30 May 2019, he was absolved together with eight of his advisors which were also being investigated.

== See also ==
- Holmes & Watson. Madrid Days

Political offices
Preceded by Joaquín Leguina	President of the Community of Madrid; 1995-2003	Succeeded by Esperanza Aguirre
Preceded by José María Álvarez del Manzano	Mayor of Madrid; 2003-2011	Succeeded by Ana Botella
Preceded by Francisco Caamaño	Minister of Justice; 2011-2014	Succeeded by Soraya Sáenz de Santamaría acting
Party political offices
Preceded by Jorge Verstrynge	Secretary-General of People's Alliance; 1986–1987	Succeeded by Arturo García-Tizón
Preceded by Luis Guillermo Perinat	Leader of the People's Party Group in the Assembly of Madrid; 1987–1993	Succeeded by Antonio Beteta
Preceded by José Miguel Ortí	Leader of the People's Party Group in the Senate; 1993–1995	Succeeded by Ángel Acebes
