= Manuel Cobo =

Spanish politician (born 1956)

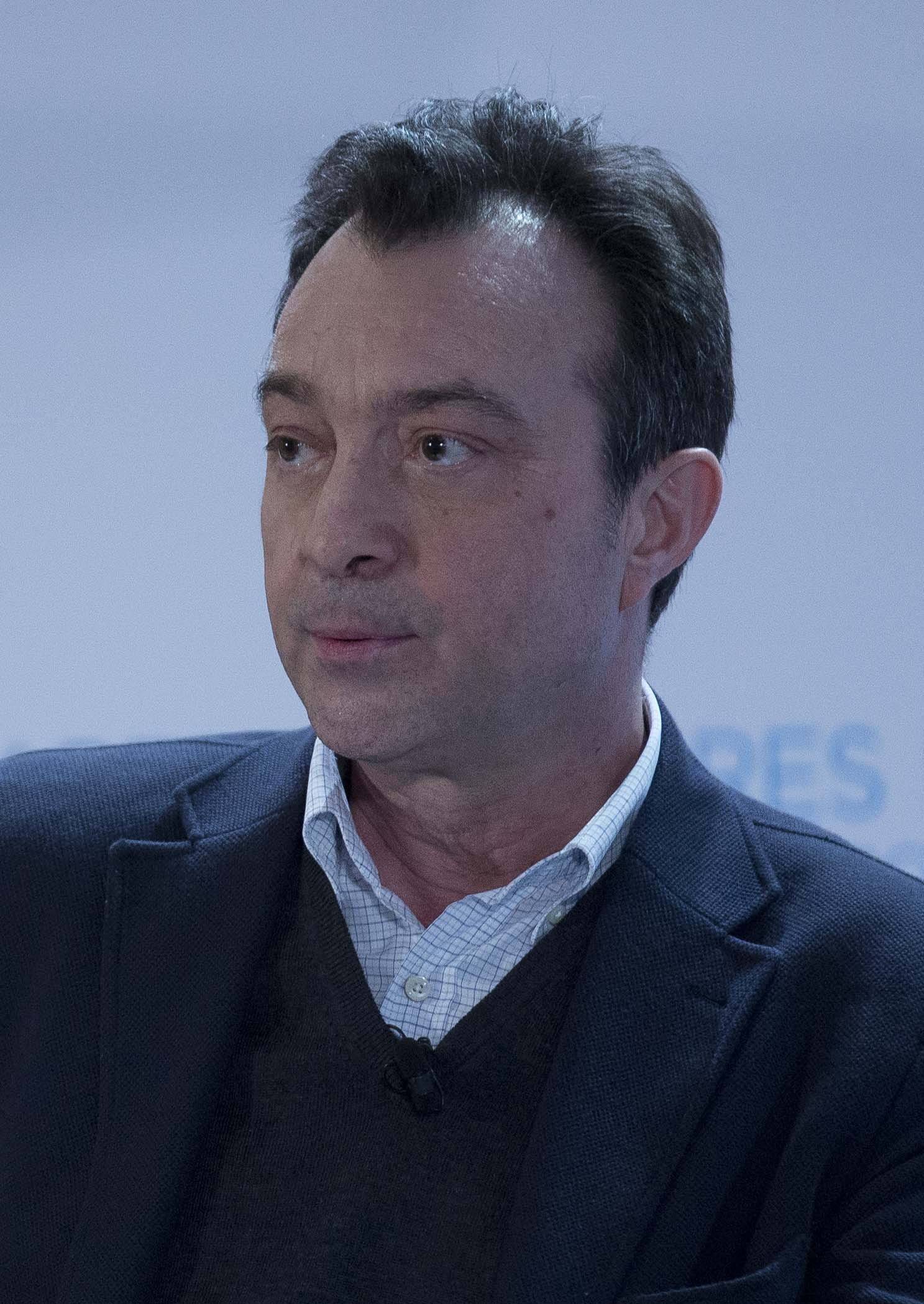

Manuel Cobo Vega (born 18 June 1956) is a Spanish People's Party (PP) politician.

He served in the Assembly of Madrid from 1991 to 2003, where he was finance minister. He followed his mentor Alberto Ruiz-Gallardón into the local politics of Madrid, as a member of the city council from 2003 to 2012. He was deputy mayor and briefly acting mayor of the city. Following ill health and a double lung transplant, he returned to politics in 2023 as a member of the Congress of Deputies.

== Biography ==
Born in Ponferrada, Province of León, Cobo earned a law degree from the Complutense University of Madrid (1978), a diploma in business consultancy from Madrid's School of Legal Practice (1984) and a Master of Business Administration from ICADE in 1986.

Cobo was elected to the Assembly of Madrid in 1991, and became secretary general of the People's Party (PP) group. Re-elected in 1995, he became the party's spokesman. He served as the finance minister in the government of Alberto Ruiz-Gallardón.

In 2003, both Cobo and Ruiz-Gallardón made the move from regional to municipal politics, as deputy mayor and mayor of Madrid, respectively. Cobo was acting mayor from 22 to 27 December 2011, between his mentor's resignation and the inauguration of Ana Botella. He too left the city council early the following year, to become the management coordinator at IFEMA, the Madrid railway body. He turned down an offer to work in the Ministry of Justice, led by Ruiz-Gallardón, as he felt that he did not have the right profile for it.

Cobo left his role at IFEMA in September 2015 and announced that December that he was quitting politics, for personal reasons. He was unable to take the seat in the Congress of Deputies that he had won in that year's general election for his native province's constituency; in 2017 he resigned shortly after being named in charge of an anti-corruption drive in the PP. The cause of his resignations was ill health from his smoking; after nearly losing the ability to speak, he underwent a double lung transplant in 2020.

In April 2022, he was announced as part of the PP leadership of new leader Alberto Núñez Feijóo. He was named 7th on the PP list for the Madrid constituency in the 2023 Spanish general election, and was elected.
