= José Enrique Núñez Guijarro =

Spanish politician (born 1974)

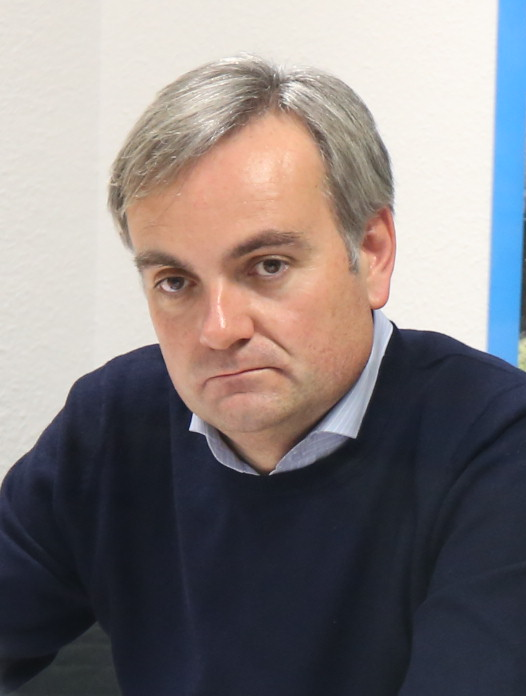
- Núñez in 2018

Member of the Congress of Deputies
- Incumbent
- Assumed office 30 January 2024
- Preceded by: Marta Rivera de la Cruz
- Constituency: Madrid

Personal details
- Born: 14 March 1974 (age 52)
- Party: People's Party

José Enrique Núñez Guijarro (born 14 March 1974) is a Spanish politician serving as a member of the Congress of Deputies since 2024. In 2015, he served as first deputy mayor of Madrid.
