= Ana Botella =

Spanish politician (born 1953)

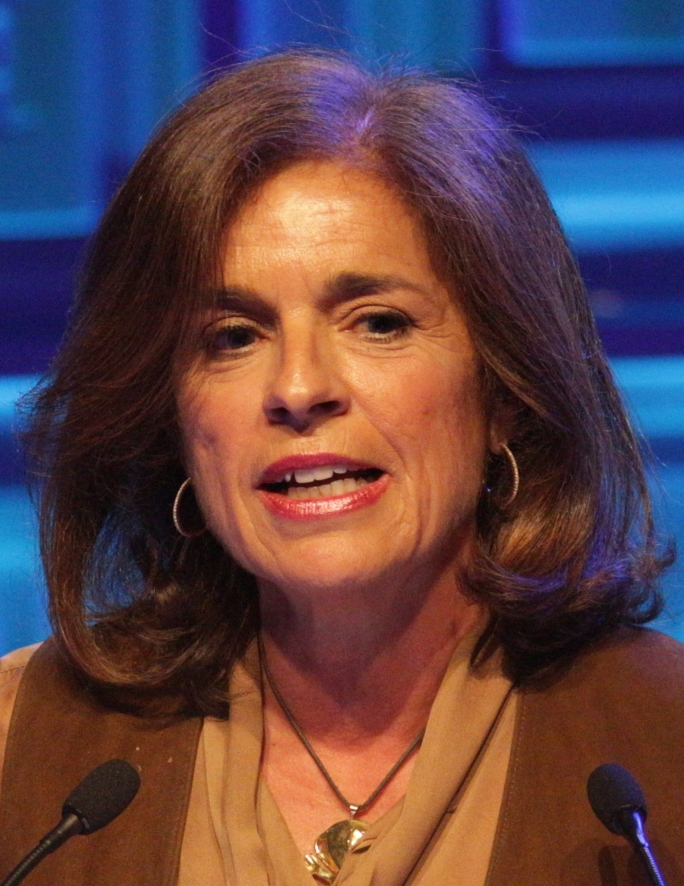
- Botella in 2015

Mayor of Madrid
- In office 27 December 2011 – 13 June 2015
- Preceded by: Alberto Ruiz-Gallardón; Manuel Cobo (interim)
- Succeeded by: Manuela Carmena

Personal details
- Born: 23 July 1953 (age 73) Madrid, Spain
- Party: People's Alliance (1978–1989); People's Party (since 1989)
- Spouse: José María Aznar (m. 1977)
- Children: 3
- Education: Complutense University of Madrid
- Profession: Civil servant; politician

Ana María Botella Serrano (born 23 July 1953) is a Spanish People's Party politician who served as the Mayor of Madrid, the capital city of Spain, from the end of 2011 until 2015 and the wife of Prime Minister José María Aznar. She was the first woman to hold the title of mayor of Madrid.

== Early life ==
Botella was born in Madrid on 23 July 1953. She took her primary education at the Colegio Irlandesas Madrid, associated with the Congregation of Jesus. She then studied law at Complutense University of Madrid. After graduating, she passed a public examination to the Corps of Civil Administrators of the State,

== Early political career ==
Botella joined the People's Alliance in 1978. She served for 14 years as civil servant in the Ministry of the Interior, the Civil Governance of Logroño, the Ministry of Public Works, the Ministry of Finance, and the Ministry of Finance in Valladolid.

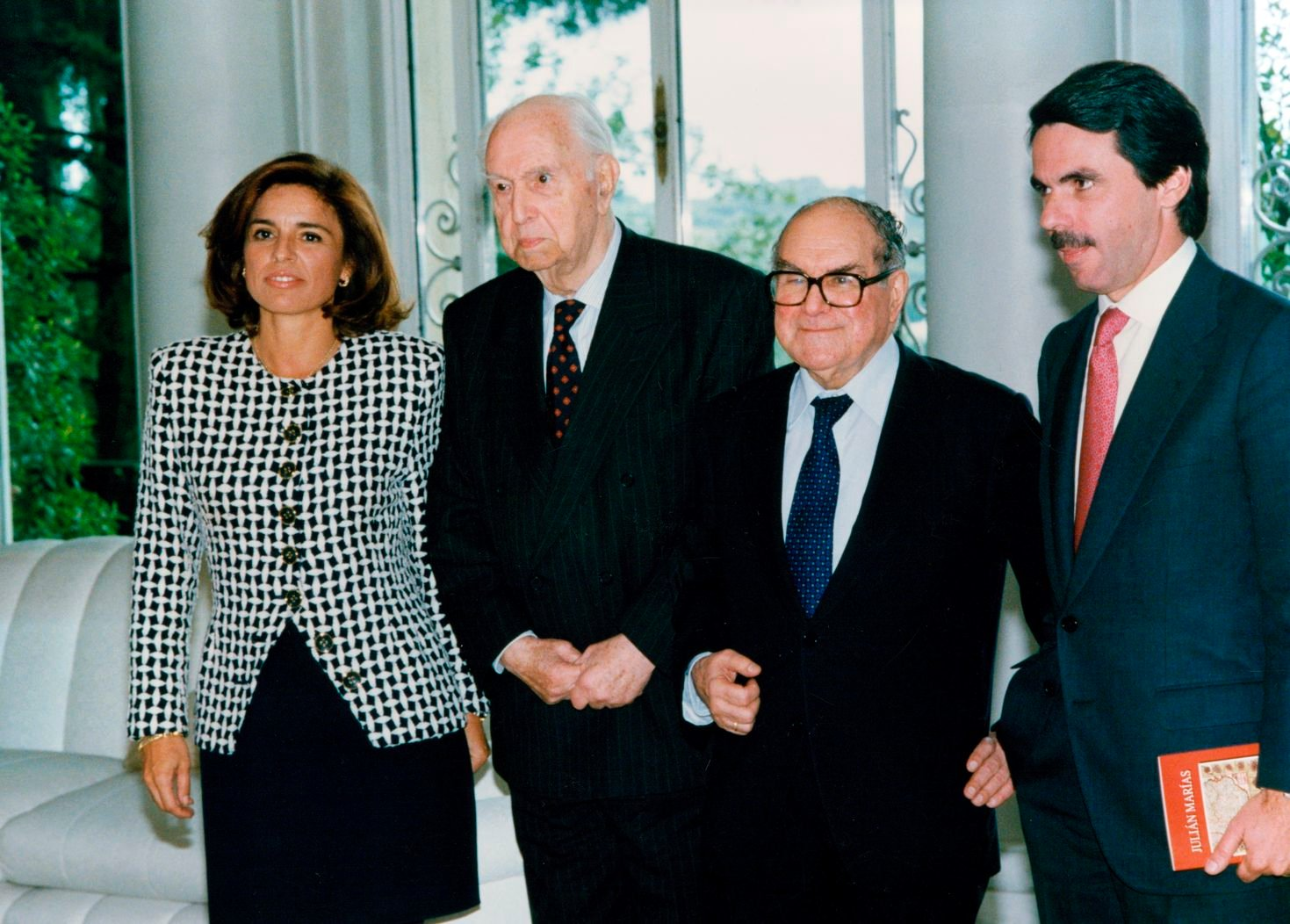
Botella in 1996 in La Moncloa

== Politics of Madrid ==
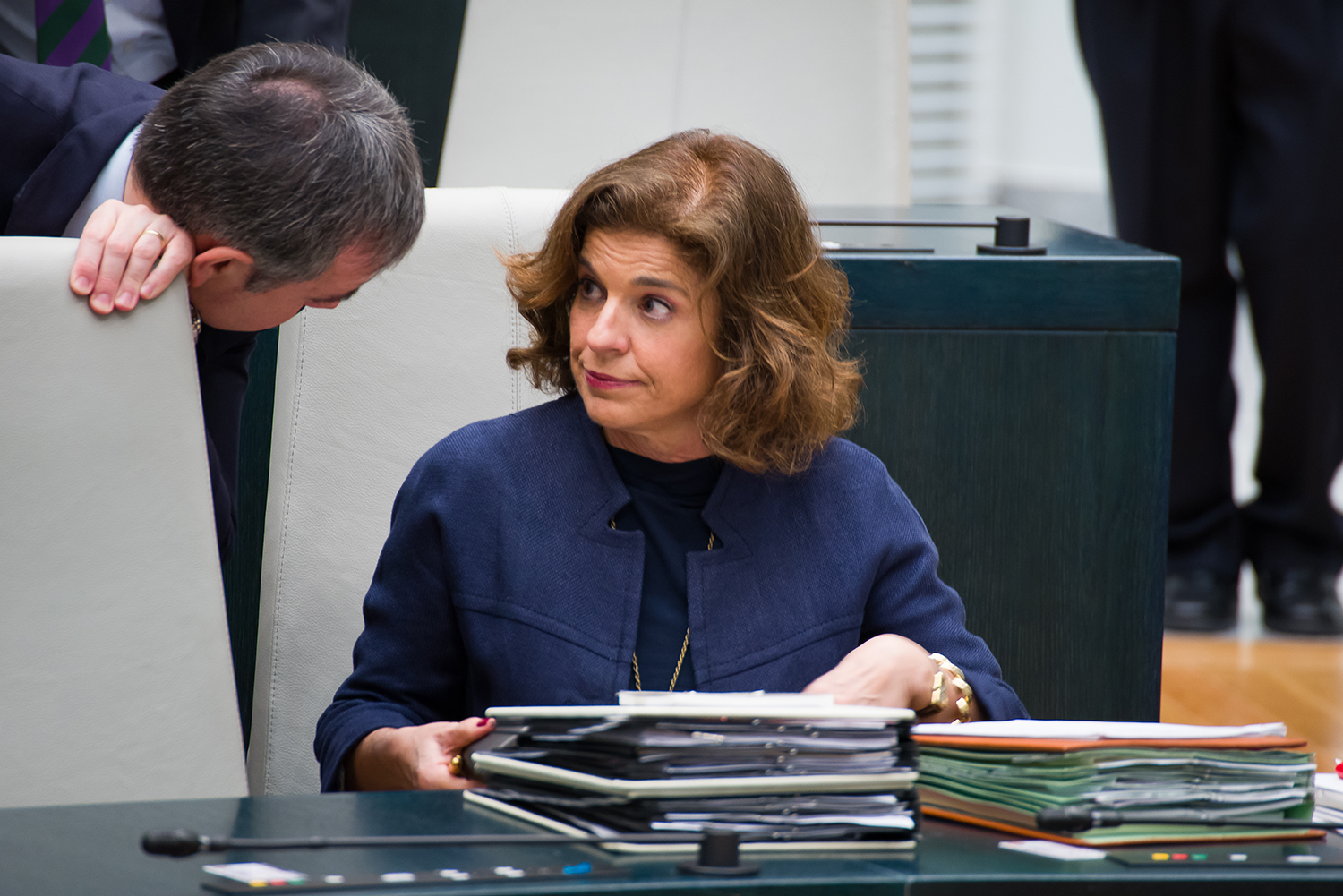
In April 2013 before a plenary meeting of the city council

Botella served on the Madrid City Council from 2003 to 2011. During her terms, she served as deputy mayor to Alberto Ruiz-Gallardón and oversaw the Departments of Social Services (2003-2007) and Environment (2007-2011). She was criticized for failure to tackle Madrid's air pollution which frequently exceeded permitted levels while she was responsible for the city's environment. Botella was an outspoken climate change denier.

In September 2013, Botella garnered national attention following embarrassing and nonsensical comments made in broken English during Madrid's push to host the 2020 Summer Olympics, which derailed what was otherwise a highly respected bid and turned her into a popular meme.

When Ruiz-Gallardón resigned to become the Justice Minister in Prime Minister Mariano Rajoy's government, Botella became mayor on 27 December 2011. On 9 September 2014, Botella announced that she would not run for re-election in the May 2015 elections.

== Personal life ==
Botella married future Spanish Prime Minister José María Aznar in 1977. The couple has three children: José María, Ana, and Alonso. Their daughter married businessman Alejandro Agag at the royal site of El Escorial on 5 September 2002. Ana Botella has four grandchildren by her daughter.

== Electoral history ==
Electoral history of Ana Botella
Election	List	Constituency	List position	Result
Madrid local election, 2003	PP	-	3rd (out of 55)	Elected
Madrid local election, 2007	PP	-	2nd (out of 57)	Elected
Madrid local election, 2011	PP	-	2nd (out of 57)	Elected

== Bibliography ==
- Botella, Ana. Mis ocho años en La Moncloa

Honorary titles
Preceded by Carmen Romero López	Spouse of the Prime Minister of Spain; 1996–2004	Succeeded by Sonsoles Espinosa
Political offices
Preceded by Manuel Cobo; Acting	Mayor of Madrid; 2011–2015	Succeeded by Manuela Carmena
