= List of Madrid councillors (2015–2019) =

This list presents the members of the Madrid Municipal Council in the 2015–2019 period, including substitutes:

Full name	Municipal group/ Electoral list	Term start	Term end
Esperanza Aguirre Gil de Biedma	PP	13 June 2015	30 May 2017
Rommy Arce Legua	Ahora Madrid	13 June 2015	15 June 2019
José Javier Barbero Gutiérrez	Ahora Madrid	13 June 2015	15 June 2019
Ignacio de Benito Pérez	PSOE	13 June 2015	15 June 2019
Luis Miguel Boto Martínez	PP	31 May 2017	15 June 2019
Sergio Brabezo Carballo	Cs	13 June 2015	15 June 2019
José Manuel Calvo del Olmo	Ahora Madrid	13 June 2015	15 June 2019
Francisco de Borja Carabante Muntada	PP	13 June 2015	24 November 2016
Manuela Carmena Castrillo	Ahora Madrid	13 June 2015	15 June 2019
Pablo César Carmona Pascual	Ahora Madrid	13 June 2015	15 June 2019
Antonio Miguel Carmona Sancipriano	PSOE	13 June 2015	15 June 2019
María Carmen Castell Díaz	PP	13 June 2015	15 June 2019
Purificación Causapié Lopesino	PSOE	13 June 2015	15 June 2019
Pablo Cavero Martínez de Campos	PP	13 June 2015	27 September 2016
Orlando Chacón Tabares	PP	28 November 2016	15 June 2019
Borja Corominas Fisas	PP	22 December 2016	15 June 2019
Pedro María Corral Corral	PP	13 June 2015	15 June 2019
José Manuel Dávila Pérez	PSOE	13 June 2015	15 June 2019
Alicia Delibes Liniers	PP	13 June 2015	27 June 2017
Ana María Domínguez Soler	Cs	13 June 2015	15 June 2019
Beatriz María Elorriaga Pisarik	PP	13 June 2015	15 June 2019
María del Mar Espinar Mesa-Moles	PSOE	13 June 2015	15 June 2019
Francisco de Borja Fanjul Fernández-Pita	PP	13 June 2015	29 November 2016
Monserrat Galcerán Huguet	Ahora Madrid	13 June 2015	15 June 2019
Jorge García Castaño	Ahora Madrid	13 June 2015	15 June 2019
Paloma García Romero	PP	28 September 2016	15 June 2019
Marta Gómez Lahoz	Ahora Madrid	13 June 2015	15 June 2019
Esther Gómez Morante	Ahora Madrid	13 June 2015	15 June 2019
María de las Mercedes González Fernández	PSOE	13 June 2015	15 June 2019
Álvaro González López	PP	13 June 2015	15 June 2019
Íñigo Henríquez de Luna Losada	PP	13 June 2015	30 April 2019
Marta María Higueras Garrobo	Ahora Madrid	13 June 2015	15 June 2019
Bosco Labrado Prieto	Cs	13 June 2015	15 June 2019
María Begoña Larraínzar Zaballa	PP	30 September 2015	15 June 2019
Rita Maestre Fernández	Ahora Madrid	13 June 2015	15 June 2019
Almudena Maíllo del Valle	PP	13 June 2015	15 June 2019
Percival Peter Manglano Albacar	PP	13 June 2015	15 June 2019
Carmen Martínez de Sola Coello de Portugal	PP	28 June 2017	15 June 2019
Fernando Martínez Vidal	PP	13 June 2015	30 April 2019
José Luis Martínez-Almeida Navasqüés	PP	13 June 2015	15 June 2019
María Isabel Martínez-Cubells Yraola	PP	13 June 2015	15 June 2019
Celia Mayer Duque	Ahora Madrid	13 June 2015	15 June 2019
María Carlota Merchán Mesón	PSOE	13 June 2015	24 November 2016
Sofía Miranda Esteban	Cs	13 June 2015	15 June 2019
José Luis Moreno Casas	PP	13 June 2015	15 June 2019
Jesús Moreno Sánchez	PP	13 June 2015	15 June 2019
Ignacio Murgui Parra	Ahora Madrid	13 June 2015	15 June 2019
Julio Ransés Pérez Boga	PSOE	13 June 2015	15 June 2019
Francisco Pérez Ramos	Ahora Madrid	13 June 2015	15 June 2019
Miguel Ángel Redondo Rodríguez	Cs	13 June 2015	15 June 2019
Yolanda Rodríguez Martínez	Ahora Madrid	13 June 2015	15 June 2019
Erika María Rodríguez Pinzón	PSOE	28 November 2016	15 June 2019
Ana María Román Martín	PP	13 June 2015	15 June 2019
Isabel Rosell Volart	PP	13 June 2015	15 June 2019
José María Rotellar García	PP	13 June 2015	16 September 2015
Silvia Elena Saavedra Ibarrondo	Cs	13 June 2015	15 June 2019
Inés Sabanés Nadal	Ahora Madrid	13 June 2015	15 June 2019
Carlos Sánchez Mato	Ahora Madrid	13 June 2015	15 June 2019
María Inmaculada Sanz Otero	PP	13 June 2015	15 June 2019
Gema Sanz Sanz	PP	9 May 2019	15 June 2019
Carlos Segura Gutiérrez	PP	9 May 2019	15 June 2019
Ramón Silva Buenadicha	PSOE	13 June 2015	15 June 2019
Pablo Soto Bravo	Ahora Madrid	13 June 2015	15 June 2019
Mauricio Valiente Ots	Ahora Madrid	13 June 2015	15 June 2019
Begoña Villacís Sánchez	Cs	13 June 2015	15 June 2019
Guillermo Zapata Romero	Ahora Madrid	13 June 2015	15 June 2019
