= 2007 Madrid municipal election =

Election in the Spanish municipality of Madrid

- 27 May 2007

All 57 seats in the City Council of Madrid 29 seats needed for a majority
- Opinion polls
- Registered: 2,404,697 ▼3.2%
- Turnout: 1,585,441 (65.9%) ▼3.0 pp
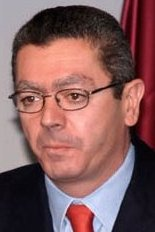

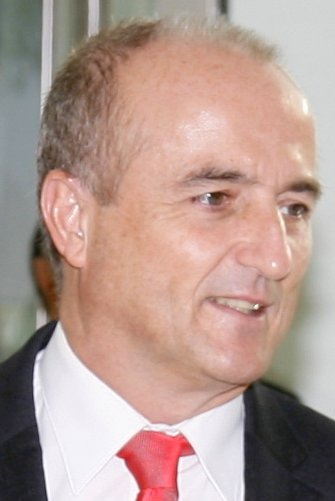

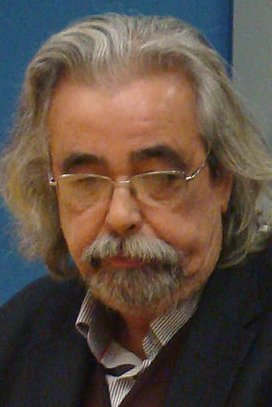
	First party	Second party	Third party
Leader	Alberto Ruiz-Gallardón	Miguel Sebastián	Ángel Pérez
Party	PP	PSOE	IUCM
Leader since	18 July 2002	18 November 2006	26 January 2007
Last election	30 seats, 51.3%	21 seats, 36.7%	4 seats, 7.2%
Seats won	34	18	5
Seat change	▲4	▼3	▲1
Popular vote	877,589	487,887	136,881
Percentage	55.6%	30.9%	8.7%
Swing	▲4.3 pp	▼5.8 pp	▲1.5 pp
Mayor before election
Alberto Ruiz-Gallardón
PP
Mayor after election
Alberto Ruiz-Gallardón
PP

A municipal election was held in Madrid on 27 May 2007 to elect the 8th City Council of the municipality. All 57 seats in the City Council were up for election. It was held concurrently with regional elections in thirteen autonomous communities and local elections all across Spain.

Alberto Ruiz-Gallardón's People's Party (PP) went on to win the largest victory achieved by a candidate in a municipal election in Madrid to date, with over 55% of the votes and nearly 60% of the seats. The Spanish Socialist Workers' Party (PSOE) plummeted barely above 1995 levels, while United Left (IU) recovered from its negative result in 2003 and gained support for the first time since 1995.

== Overview ==
Under the 1978 Constitution, the governance of municipalities in Spain—part of the country's local government system—was centered on the figure of city councils (Spanish: ayuntamientos), local corporations with independent legal personality composed of a mayor, a government council and an elected legislative assembly. The mayor was indirectly elected by the local assembly, requiring an absolute majority; otherwise, the candidate from the most-voted party automatically became mayor (ties were resolved by drawing lots). In the case of Madrid, the top-tier administrative and governing body was the City Council of Madrid.

=== Date ===
The term of local assemblies in Spain expired four years after the date of their previous election, with election day being fixed for the fourth Sunday of May every four years. The election decree was required to be issued no later than 54 days before the scheduled election date and published on the following day in the Official State Gazette (BOE). The previous local elections were held on 25 May 2003, setting the date for election day on the fourth Sunday of May four years later, which was 27 May 2007.

Local assemblies could not be dissolved before the expiration of their term, except in cases of mismanagement that seriously harmed the public interest and implied a breach of constitutional obligations, in which case the Council of Ministers could—optionally—decide to call a by-election.

Elections to the assemblies of local entities were officially called on 3 April 2007 with the publication of the corresponding decree in the BOE, setting election day for 27 May.

=== Electoral system ===
Voting for local assemblies was based on universal suffrage, comprising all Spanish nationals over 18 years of age, registered and residing in the municipality and with full political rights (provided that they had not been deprived of the right to vote by a final sentence, nor were legally incapacitated), as well as resident non-national European citizens, and those whose country of origin allowed reciprocal voting by virtue of a treaty.

Local councillors were elected using the D'Hondt method and closed-list proportional voting, with a five percent-threshold of valid votes (including blank ballots) in each municipality. Each municipality was a multi-member constituency, with a number of seats based on the following scale:

Population	Councillors
<250	5
251–1,000	7
1,001–2,000	9
2,001–5,000	11
5,001–10,000	13
10,001–20,000	17
20,001–50,000	21
50,001–100,000	25
>100,001	+1 per each 100,000 inhabitants or fraction +1 if total is an even number

The law did not provide for by-elections to fill vacant seats; instead, any vacancies arising after the proclamation of candidates and during the legislative term were filled by the next candidates on the party lists or, when required, by designated substitutes.

== Parties and candidates ==
The electoral law allowed for parties and federations registered in the interior ministry, alliances and groupings of electors to present lists of candidates. Parties and federations intending to form an alliance were required to inform the relevant electoral commission within 10 days of the election call, whereas groupings of electors needed to secure the signature of a determined amount of the electors registered in the municipality for which they sought election, disallowing electors from signing for more than one list. In the case of Madrid, as its population was over 1,000,001, at least 8,000 signatures were required. Amendments earlier in 2007 required a balanced composition of men and women in the electoral lists, so that candidates of either sex made up at least 40 percent of the total composition.

Below is a list of the main parties and alliances which contested the election:

Candidacy	Parties and alliances	Leading candidate	Ideology	Previous result		Gov.	Ref.
Candidacy	Parties and alliances	Leading candidate	Ideology	Vote %	Seats	Gov.	Ref.
PP	List: People's Party (PP)	Alberto Ruiz-Gallardón	Conservatism; Christian democracy	51.3%	30	Yes	
PSOE	List: Spanish Socialist Workers' Party (PSOE)	Miguel Sebastián	Social democracy	36.7%	21	No	
IUCM	List: United Left of the Community of Madrid (IUCM) – Communist Party of Madrid (PCM) – Revolutionary Workers' Party (POR)	Ángel Pérez	Socialism; Communism	7.2%	4	No	

== Opinion polls ==
The tables below list opinion polling results in reverse chronological order, showing the most recent first and using the dates when the survey fieldwork was done, as opposed to the date of publication. Where the fieldwork dates are unknown, the date of publication is given instead. The highest percentage figure in each polling survey is displayed with its background shaded in the leading party's colour. If a tie ensues, this is applied to the figures with the highest percentages. The "Lead" column on the right shows the percentage-point difference between the parties with the highest percentages in a poll.

=== Voting intention estimates ===
The table below lists weighted voting intention estimates. Refusals are generally excluded from the party vote percentages, while question wording and the treatment of "don't know" responses and those not intending to vote may vary between polling organisations. When available, seat projections determined by the polling organisations are displayed below (or in place of) the percentages in a smaller font; 29 seats were required for an absolute majority in the City Council of Madrid (28 in the 2003 election).

Color key:

Exit poll

Polling firm/Commissioner	Fieldwork date	Sample size	Turnout	PP	PSOE	IUCM	Lead
2007 municipal election	27 May 2007	—N/a	65.9	55.6; 34	30.9; 18	8.7; 5	24.7
Ipsos/RTVE–FORTA	27 May 2007	?	?	52.9; 31/33	33.1; 19/21	8.8; 5/6	19.8
Sigma Dos/El Mundo	18 May 2007	400	?	53.5; 32/33	32.8; 19/20	9.5; 5	20.7
Metroscopia/ABC	14–16 May 2007	?	65–70	54.5; 33	34.5; 21	6.0; 3	20.0
Opina/El País	14 May 2007	?	?	53.0; 32	37.0; 21/22	6.5; 3/4	16.0
TNS Demoscopia/Antena 3	9 May 2007	?	?	? 32/33	? 21/22	? 3/4	?
Sigma Dos/El Mundo	2–9 May 2007	500	?	52.5; 31/32	36.6; 22/23	5.9; 3	15.9
Opina/Cadena SER (Note: "Pulsómetro 11/05/2007". Cadena SER (in Spanish). 11 May 2007. Archived from the original on 13 May 2007.)	6 May 2007	600	?	56.3; 33	35.4; 20/21	6.4; 3/4	20.9
CIS	2–4 May 2007	1,000	?	52.7; 32	34.5; 21	7.1; 4	18.2
Opina/El País	21–22 Mar 2007	700	?	53.0; 31/32	38.0; 22/23	5.5; 3	15.0
PSOE	1 Mar 2007	?	70	? 28/29	? 24	? 4/5	?
Metroscopia/CEIM	12 Feb–1 Mar 2007	975	?	53.9; 32	35.0; 21	7.4; 4	18.9
Sigma Dos/PP	14–25 Feb 2007	1,200	?	52.5; 30/31	36.1; 20/21	6.8; 4	16.4
Sigma Dos/El Mundo	16–21 Nov 2006	400	?	57.0; 32/33	32.9; 19/20	5.5; 3	24.1
Iberconsulta/La Razón (Note: "Suspiro de alivio en Génova con la última encuesta de Madrid". Semanal Digital (in Spanish). 17 September 2006.)	17 Sep 2006	?	?	53.3; 31	34.2; 20	? 4	19.1
Opina/El País	26 Apr 2006	542	?	51.0; 29	38.0; 22	8.0; 4	13.0
Synovate/PSOE	15 May 2005	1,012	?	? 28	? 22	? 5	?
2004 EP election	13 Jun 2004	—N/a	53.6	52.5 (30)	40.0 (23)	5.1 (2)	12.5
2004 general election	14 Mar 2004	—N/a	80.8	47.6 (28)	41.8 (24)	6.3 (3)	5.8
October 2003 regional election	26 Oct 2003	—N/a	66.2	51.2 (30)	36.6 (21)	8.4 (4)	14.6
2003 municipal election	25 May 2003	—N/a	68.9	51.3; 30	36.7; 21	7.2; 4	14.6

=== Voting preferences ===
The table below lists raw, unweighted voting preferences.

Polling firm/Commissioner	Fieldwork date	Sample size	PP	PSOE	IUCM	Question	X mark	Lead
2007 municipal election	27 May 2007	—N/a	36.5	20.3	5.7	—N/a	34.1	16.2
CIS	2–4 May 2007	1,000	42.1	23.1	4.8	18.5	4.1	19.0
2004 EP election (Note: Does not include non-resident citizens.)	13 Jun 2004	—N/a	28.1	21.4	2.7	—N/a	46.4	6.7
2004 general election	14 Mar 2004	—N/a	38.3	33.6	5.1	—N/a	19.2	4.7
October 2003 regional election	26 Oct 2003	—N/a	33.7	24.1	5.5	—N/a	33.8	9.6
2003 municipal election	25 May 2003	—N/a	35.2	25.2	5.0	—N/a	31.1	10.0

=== Victory preferences ===
The table below lists opinion polling on the victory preferences for each party in the event of a municipal election taking place.

Polling firm/Commissioner	Fieldwork date	Sample size	PP	PSOE	IUCM	Other/ None	Question	Lead
Opina/Cadena SER	6 May 2007	600	47.7	30.0	5.5	1.5	11.9	17.7
CIS	2–4 May 2007	1,000	46.8	27.7	4.6	8.1	12.8	19.1

=== Victory likelihood ===
The table below lists opinion polling on the perceived likelihood of victory for each party in the event of a municipal election taking place.

Polling firm/Commissioner	Fieldwork date	Sample size	PP	PSOE	IUCM	Other/ None	Question	Lead
Opina/Cadena SER	6 May 2007	600	73.3	7.0	0.2	–	19.5	66.3
CIS	2–4 May 2007	1,000	68.7	11.3	–	0.8	19.2	57.4

=== Preferred Mayor ===
The table below lists opinion polling on leader preferences to become mayor of Madrid.

All candidates

Polling firm/Commissioner	Fieldwork date	Sample size						Other/ None/ Not care	Question	Lead
Polling firm/Commissioner	Fieldwork date	Sample size	Gallardón PP	Jiménez PSOE	Sebastián PSOE	Sabanés IUCM	Pérez IUCM	Other/ None/ Not care	Question	Lead
Opina/El País	14 May 2007	?	50.0	–	27.0	–	–	23.0		23.0
Opina/Cadena SER	6 May 2007	600	50.2	–	28.2	–	5.8	6.0	9.9	22.0
CIS	2–4 May 2007	1,000	49.9	–	17.7	–	2.6	17.2	12.6	32.2
Opina/El País	26 Apr 2006	542	43.2	28.2	–	6.8	–	8.9	12.9	15.0

Gallardón vs. Sebastián

Polling firm/Commissioner	Fieldwork date	Sample size			Other/ None/ Not care	Question	Lead
Polling firm/Commissioner	Fieldwork date	Sample size	Gallardón PP	Sebastián PSOE	Other/ None/ Not care	Question	Lead
Opina/El País	21–22 Mar 2007	700	53.0	32.1	4.9	10.0	20.9

Gallardón vs. Bono

Polling firm/Commissioner	Fieldwork date	Sample size			Other/ None/ Not care	Question	Lead
Polling firm/Commissioner	Fieldwork date	Sample size	Gallardón PP	Bono PSOE	Other/ None/ Not care	Question	Lead
PSOE	Sep 2006	?	37.0	43.0	20.0		6.0

=== Predicted Mayor ===
The table below lists opinion polling on the perceived likelihood for each leader to become mayor.

Polling firm/Commissioner	Fieldwork date	Sample size						Other/ None/ Not care	Question	Lead
Polling firm/Commissioner	Fieldwork date	Sample size	Gallardón PP	Jiménez PSOE	Sebastián PSOE	Sabanés IUCM	Pérez IUCM	Other/ None/ Not care	Question	Lead
Opina/Cadena SER	6 May 2007	600	82.0	–	7.2	–	0.2	0.2	10.5	74.8
Opina/El País	21–22 Mar 2007	700	78.4	–	11.9	–	–	0.4	9.2	66.5
Opina/El País	26 Apr 2006	542	60.7	17.5	–	0.2	–	1.5	20.1	43.2

== Results ==
← Summary of the 27 May 2007 City Council of Madrid election results →
Parties and alliances	Popular vote			Seats	
Parties and alliances	Votes	%	±pp	Total	+/−
People's Party (PP)	877,589	55.65	+4.35	34	+4
Spanish Socialist Workers' Party (PSOE)	487,887	30.94	−5.74	18	−3
United Left of the Community of Madrid (IUCM)	136,881	8.68	+1.46	5	+1
The Greens (LV, LVM, LVCM, LV–GV)^{1}	14,011	0.89	−1.24	0	±0
Spanish Alternative (AES)	6,140	0.39	New	0	±0
Anti-Bullfighting Party Against Mistreatment of Animals (PACMA)	3,167	0.20	New	0	±0
For a Fairer World (PUM+J)	2,501	0.16	New	0	±0
Spanish Phalanx of the CNSO (FE de las JONS)	1,920	0.12	New	0	±0
Democratic and Social Centre (CDS)	1,681	0.11	−0.02	0	±0
National Democracy (DN)	1,571	0.10	New	0	±0
Family and Life Party (PFyV)	1,390	0.09	−0.09	0	±0
The Phalanx (FE)	1,353	0.09	−0.04	0	±0
Republican Left (IR)	1,272	0.08	−0.13	0	±0
Communist Party of the Peoples of Spain (PCPE)	1,253	0.08	New	0	±0
Madrid First (PM)	1,163	0.07	+0.02	0	±0
Humanist Party (PH)	950	0.06	±0.00	0	±0
Liberal Democratic Centre (CDL)	834	0.05	New	0	±0
Commoners' Land (TC)	821	0.05	±0.00	0	±0
Democratic Innovation (ID)	664	0.04	New	0	±0
Authentic Phalanx (FA)	530	0.03	−0.01	0	±0
Catholic Tercio of Political Action (TCAP)	461	0.03	New	0	±0
Liberal Centrist Union (UCL)	318	0.02	New	0	±0
Immigrants with Rights, Equality and Obligations (INDIO)	308	0.02	−0.01	0	±0
Union for Leganés (ULEG)	188	0.01	New	0	±0
European Ibero-American Alliance Party (PAIE)	151	0.01	New	0	±0
Blank ballots	32,066	2.03	+0.43		
Total	1,577,070			57	+2
Valid votes	1,577,070	99.47	−0.09		
Invalid votes	8,371	0.53	+0.09		
Votes cast / turnout	1,585,441	65.93	−2.97		
Abstentions	819,256	34.07	+2.97		
Registered voters	2,404,697				
Sources
Footnotes: ^{1} The Greens results are compared to the combined totals of The Greens and The Greens of the Community of Madrid in the 2003 election.

Popular vote
PP	55.65%
PSOE	30.94%
IUCM	8.68%
Others	2.70%
Blank ballots	2.03%

Seats
PP	59.65%
PSOE	31.58%
IUCM	8.77%

== Aftermath ==
=== Government formation ===
Investiture
Ballot →	16 June 2007	
Required majority →	29 out of 57	
Alberto Ruiz-Gallardón (PP): • PP (34)	34 / 57	check
Pilar Gallego (PSOE): • PSOE (18)	18 / 57	X mark
Ángel Pérez (IUCM): • IUCM (5)	5 / 57	X mark
Abstentions/Blank ballots	0 / 57	
Absentees	0 / 57	

== Bibliography ==
- Constitución Española (Constitution). Official State Gazette (in Spanish). 27 December 1978 [version as of 28 August 1992]. BOE-A-1978-31229.
- Ley 7/1985, de 2 de abril, Reguladora de las Bases del Régimen Local (Law 7/1985). Official State Gazette (in Spanish). 2 April 1985 [version as of 13 April 2007]. BOE-A-1985-5392.
- Ley Orgánica 5/1985, de 19 de junio, del Régimen Electoral General (Organic Law 5/1985). Official State Gazette (in Spanish). 19 June 1985 [version as of 20 April 2007]. BOE-A-1985-11672.
- Real Decreto 444/2007, de 2 de abril, por el que se convocan elecciones locales y a las Asambleas de Ceuta y Melilla, para el 27 de mayo de 2007 (Royal Decree 444/2007). Official State Gazette (in Spanish). 2 April 2007. BOE-A-2007-7018.
