= Carlos Sánchez Mato =

Spanish economist and politician (born 1970)

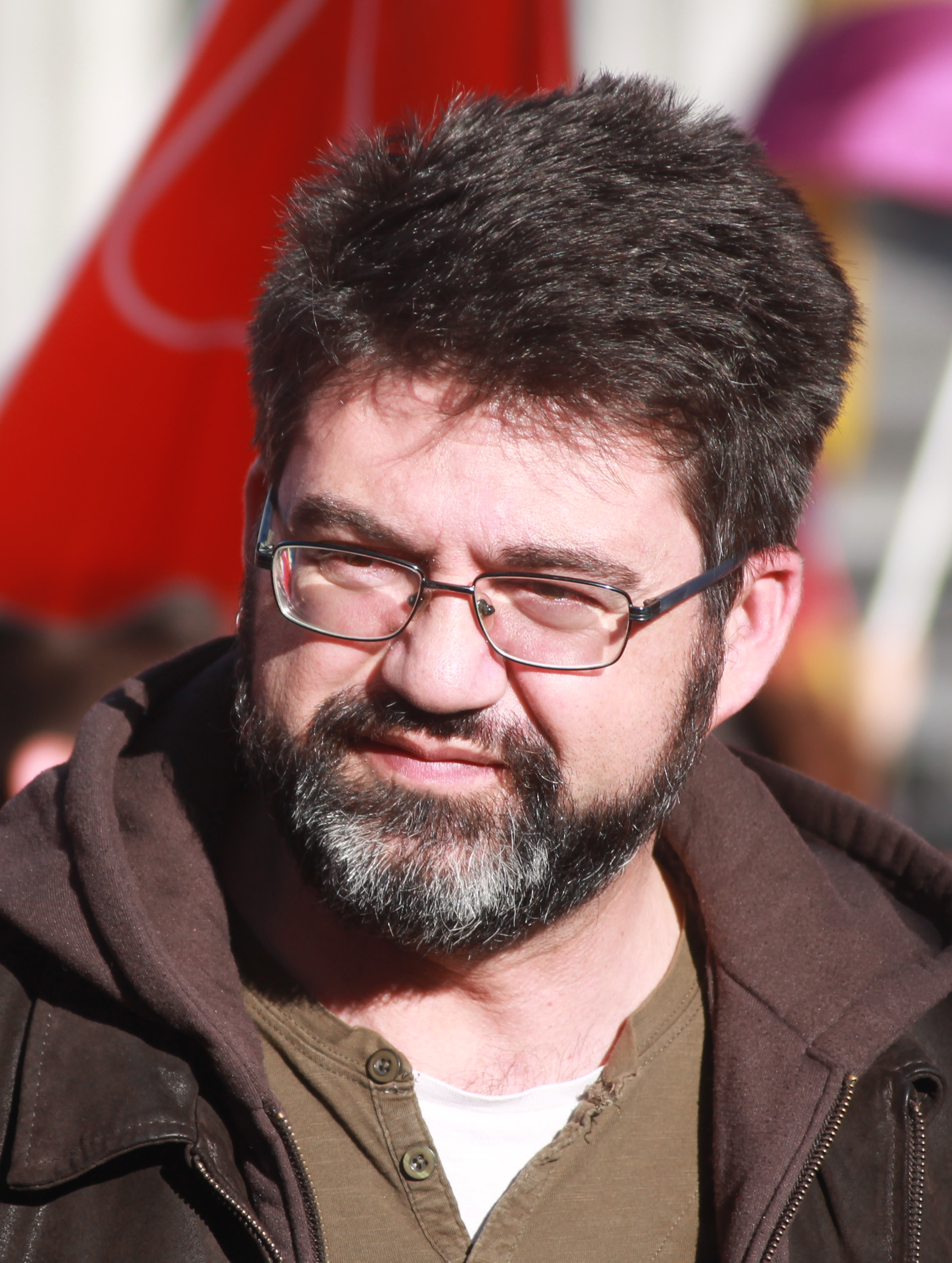
- On 14 April 2018

Madrid City Councillor
- In office 13 June 2015 – 15 June 2019

Personal details
- Born: 1970; Madrid, Spain
- Citizenship: Spanish
- Political party: United Left

Carlos Sánchez Mato (born 1970) is a Spanish politician and economist. A member of United Left and the Madrid City Council, he served as delegate of Economy and Finance in the city government board.

== Biography ==
=== Early life ===
Born in 1970 in Madrid, son of a national police officer and a housekeeper who both moved from the province of Salamanca to Madrid, he obtained a degree in Economic Sciences at the Complutense University of Madrid (UCM). A neighbor of Aluche, Sánchez Mato, self-described as a "Communist and Christian", participated in Christian grassroot groups and was active in Nueva Claridad, a Trotskyist group. He reported a case of abuse of minors in his parish in 2002 and later founded the "Association Church Without Abuses", being in the receiving end of threats because of it. With a career as economist in the private sector, he entered ATTAC Madrid in 2011.

=== 2015 municipal election ===
A longstanding member of United Left (IU), as well as a member of its regional federation United Left of the Community of Madrid (IUCM), he was forced to leave the later organization before the 2015 Madrid municipal election in order to run as candidate in the 14th slot of the Ahora Madrid list for the election. He was elected Member of the City Council. Following the investiture of Manuela Carmena as Mayor of Madrid on 13 June 2015, Sánchez Mato entered the City Government Board, holding the Area of Economy of Finance of the municipal executive. He was also appointed Councillor-President of the district of Vicálvaro. Following the de-federation of IUCM from IU, Sánchez Mato, just like Mauricio Valiente and Yolanda Rodríguez, announced in June 2015 his will to re-integrate in a new IU federation in Madrid.

=== Clash with Montoro and Carmena ===
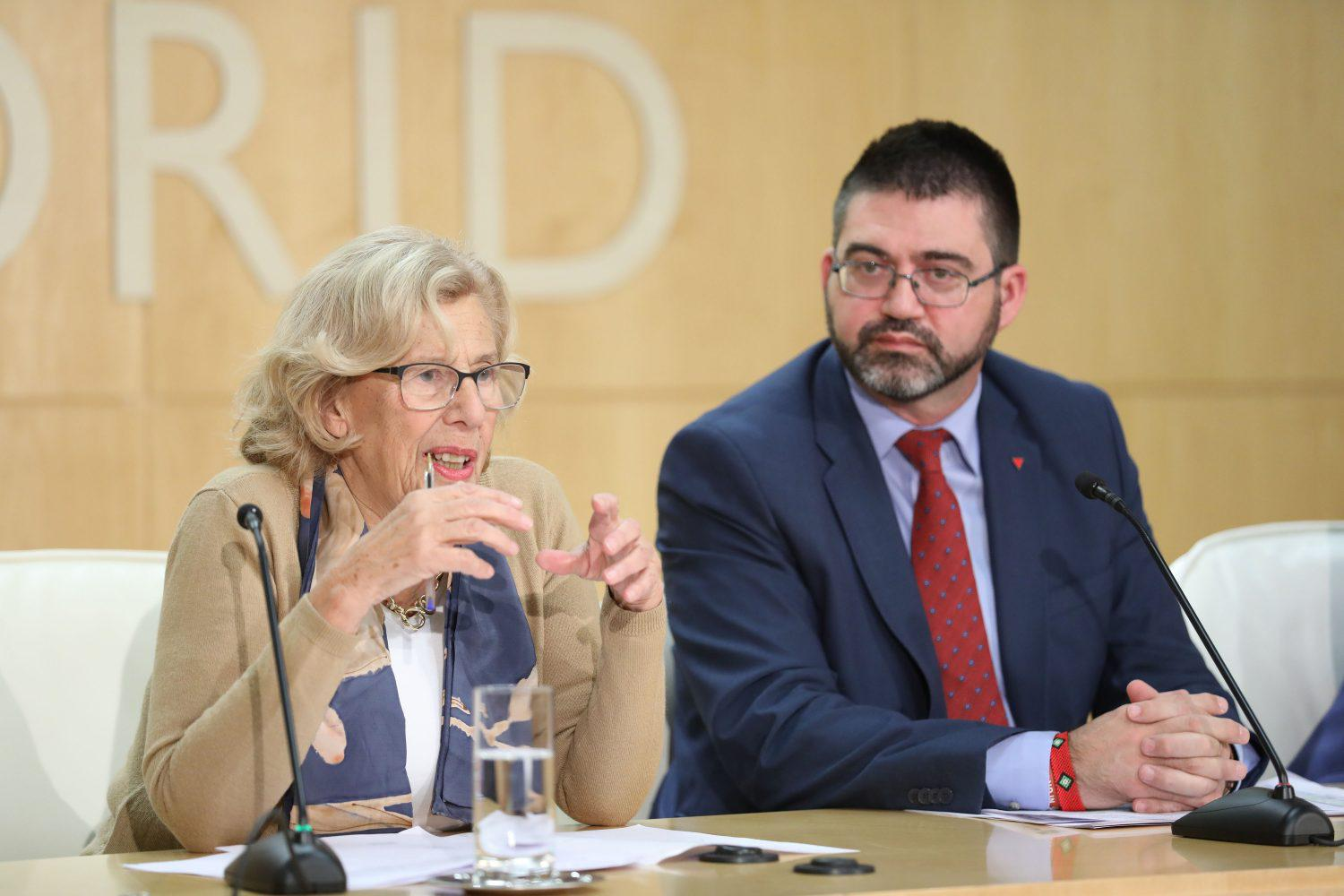
Manuela Carmena and Sánchez Mato, on 15 November 2017.

During his time as Councillor of Economy and Finance, Sánchez Mato clashed with Cristóbal Montoro, Minister of Finance, and, ultimately, also with Manuela Carmena, regarding the rule of spending imposed from the National Government and the Economic Financial Plan (PEF) for the municipality that, through austerity measures, constrained the budgetary plans initially envisioned by the City Council. This led to Carmena removing him off from the Government Board in December 2017. He was then re-shuffled to the Presidency of the district of Latina, a position he effectively assumed on 12 January 2018, replacing Esther Gómez Morante.

=== 2019 elections ===
In early March 2019 Sánchez Mato announced his intention to run in the IU primaries to select its candidates to the April 2019 general election in the Madrid constituency within the Unidas Podemos coalition list. Four days later he dropped his candidacy, thinking in what was "best for the project". Following the renouncement of Mauricio Valiente to led IU in the primary election of the Madrid En Pie coalition for the list to be presented at the 2019 Madrid municipal election, after the membership of United Left–Madrid (IU–Madrid) decided in a referendum not to run in the Unidas Podemos coalition for the 2019 Madrilenian regional election (in collision with the federal board's stance), Sánchez Mato accepted the responsibility of replacing Valiente on the condition the IU board tried their best to finally include Podemos in some form in the regional tentative candidacy, then visibly led by Sol Sánchez (IU–Madrid) and Raúl Camargo (Anticapitalistas Madrid). He edged Rommy Arce and Pablo Carmona in the voting to select the head of the municipal list.

== Books ==
- Sánchez Mato, Carlos; Garzón Espinosa, Eduardo (2019). Akal (ed.). 919 Días ¡Sí Se podía!: Cómo el Ayuntamiento de Madrid puso la economía al servicio de la gente (in Spanish). Ediciones AKAL. ISBN 9788446048633.
