= 2011 Madrid municipal election =

Election in the Spanish municipality of Madrid

- 22 May 2011

All 57 seats in the City Council of Madrid 29 seats needed for a majority
- Opinion polls
- Registered: 2,308,360 ▼4.0%
- Turnout: 1,551,613 (67.2%) ▲1.3 pp
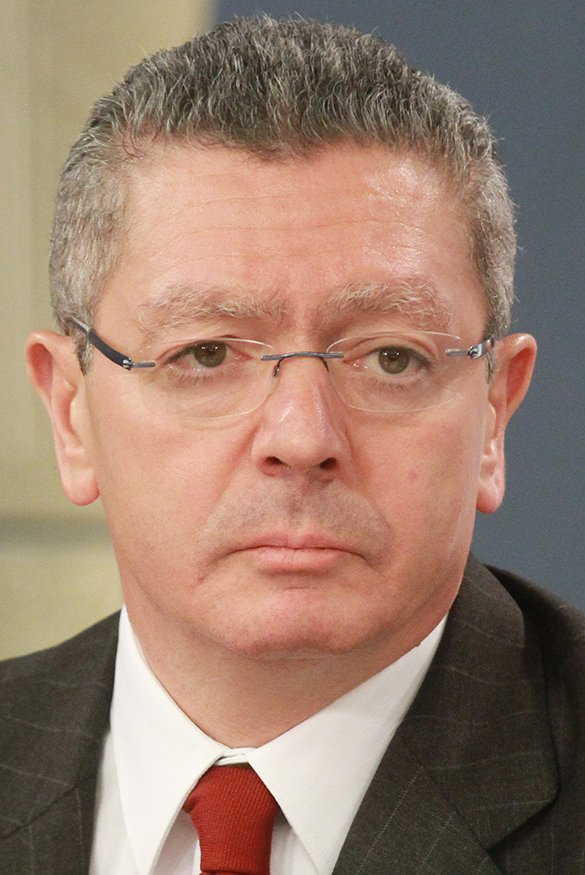

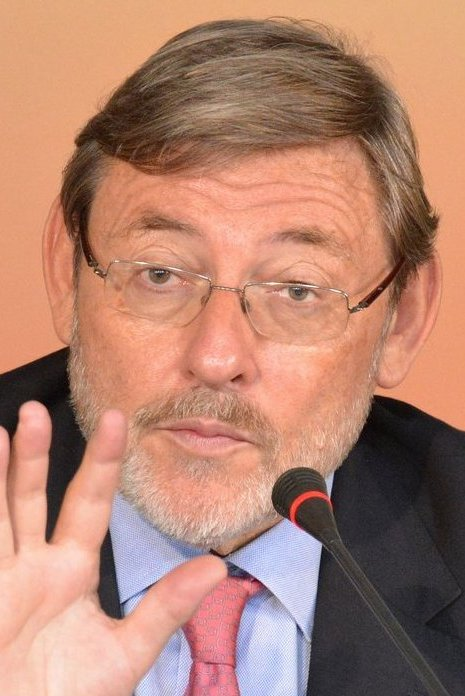

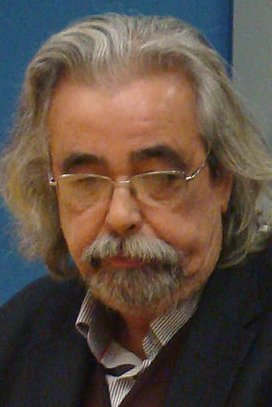

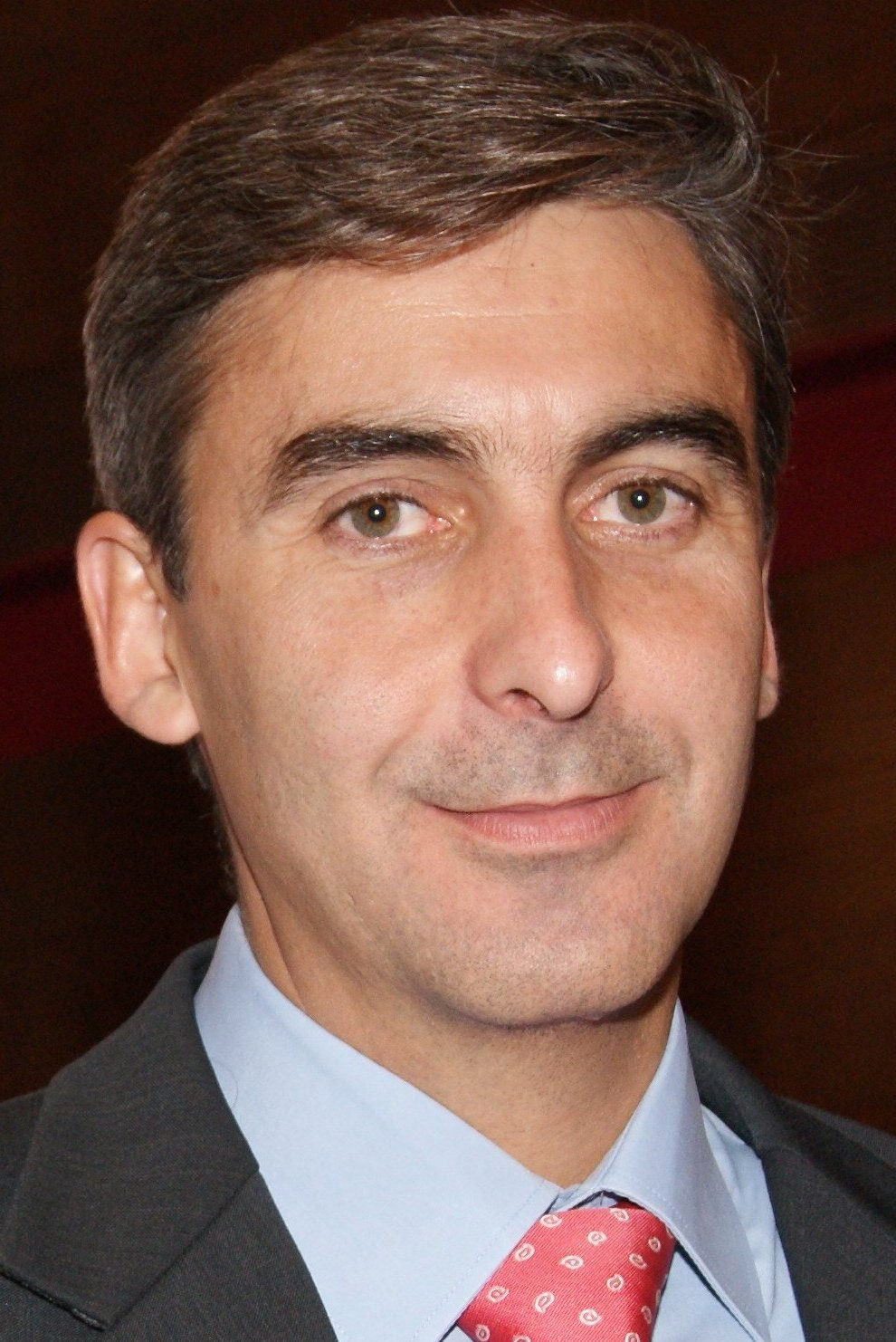
	First party	Second party	Third party
Leader	Alberto Ruiz-Gallardón	Jaime Lissavetzky	Ángel Pérez
Party	PP	PSOE	IUCM–LV
Leader since	18 July 2002	12 August 2010	26 January 2007
Last election	34 seats, 55.6%	18 seats, 30.9%	5 seats, 8.7%
Seats won	31	15	6
Seat change	▼3	▼3	▲1
Popular vote	756,952	364,600	163,706
Percentage	49.7%	23.9%	10.7%
Swing	▼5.9 pp	▼7.0 pp	▲2.0 pp
	Fourth party
Leader	David Ortega
Party	UPyD
Leader since	23 October 2010
Last election	Did not contest
Seats won	5
Seat change	▲5
Popular vote	119,601
Percentage	7.9%
Swing	New party
Mayor before election
Alberto Ruiz-Gallardón
PP
Mayor after election
Alberto Ruiz-Gallardón
PP

A municipal election was held in Madrid on 22 May 2011 to elect the 9th City Council of the municipality. All 57 seats in the City Council were up for election. It was held concurrently with regional elections in thirteen autonomous communities and local elections all across Spain.

The People's Party (PP) won its 6th consecutive absolute majority of seats in the City Council, albeit with a diminished voter base, suffering its worst loss of support in the city up until that time (120,000 votes, 6 percentage points and 3 seats were lost from 2007). Only the collapse of the Spanish Socialist Workers' Party (PSOE) vote, which obtained the worst result of its history as a result of the criticised José Luis Rodríguez Zapatero's premiership in the national government, was larger. United Left (IU) benefitted from the PSOE debacle, while newly founded Union, Progress and Democracy (UPyD) attracted votes from sectors disenchanted with both PSOE and PP and entered the City Council in the first election in which they stood.

Alberto Ruiz-Gallardón, who was re-elected for a third term in office, left the mayoralty in late 2011 to become Justice Minister, after his party won the 2011 Spanish general election and Mariano Rajoy was elected Prime Minister. He was succeeded as mayor by Ana Botella.

== Overview ==
Under the 1978 Constitution, the governance of municipalities in Spain—part of the country's local government system—was centered on the figure of city councils (Spanish: ayuntamientos), local corporations with independent legal personality composed of a mayor, a government council and an elected legislative assembly. The mayor was indirectly elected by the local assembly, requiring an absolute majority; otherwise, the candidate from the most-voted party automatically became mayor (ties were resolved by drawing lots). In the case of Madrid, the top-tier administrative and governing body was the City Council of Madrid.

=== Date ===
The term of local assemblies in Spain expired four years after the date of their previous election, with election day being fixed for the fourth Sunday of May every four years. The election decree was required to be issued no later than 54 days before the scheduled election date and published on the following day in the Official State Gazette (BOE). The previous local elections were held on 27 May 2007, setting the date for election day on the fourth Sunday of May four years later, which was 22 May 2011.

Local assemblies could not be dissolved before the expiration of their term, except in cases of mismanagement that seriously harmed the public interest and implied a breach of constitutional obligations, in which case the Council of Ministers could—optionally—decide to call a by-election.

Elections to the assemblies of local entities were officially called on 29 March 2011 with the publication of the corresponding decree in the BOE, setting election day for 22 May.

=== Electoral system ===
Voting for local assemblies was based on universal suffrage, comprising all Spanish nationals over 18 years of age, registered and residing in the municipality and with full political rights (provided that they had not been deprived of the right to vote by a final sentence, nor were legally incapacitated), as well as resident non-national European citizens, and those whose country of origin allowed reciprocal voting by virtue of a treaty.

Local councillors were elected using the D'Hondt method and closed-list proportional voting, with a five percent-threshold of valid votes (including blank ballots) in each municipality. Each municipality was a multi-member constituency, with a number of seats based on the following scale (amended for smaller municipalities in 2011):

Population	Councillors
<100	3
101–250	5
251–1,000	7
1,001–2,000	9
2,001–5,000	11
5,001–10,000	13
10,001–20,000	17
20,001–50,000	21
50,001–100,000	25
>100,001	+1 per each 100,000 inhabitants or fraction +1 if total is an even number

The law did not provide for by-elections to fill vacant seats; instead, any vacancies arising after the proclamation of candidates and during the legislative term were filled by the next candidates on the party lists or, when required, by designated substitutes.

== Parties and candidates ==
The electoral law allowed for parties and federations registered in the interior ministry, alliances and groupings of electors to present lists of candidates. Parties and federations intending to form an alliance were required to inform the relevant electoral commission within 10 days of the election call, whereas groupings of electors needed to secure the signature of a determined amount of the electors registered in the municipality for which they sought election, disallowing electors from signing for more than one list. In the case of Madrid, as its population was over 1,000,001, at least 8,000 signatures were required. Additionally, a balanced composition of men and women was required in the electoral lists, so that candidates of either sex made up at least 40 percent of the total composition.

Below is a list of the main parties and alliances which contested the election:

Candidacy	Parties and alliances	Leading candidate	Ideology	Previous result		Gov.	Ref.
Candidacy	Parties and alliances	Leading candidate	Ideology	Vote %	Seats	Gov.	Ref.
PP	List: People's Party (PP)	Alberto Ruiz-Gallardón	Conservatism; Christian democracy	55.6%	34	Yes	
PSOE	List: Spanish Socialist Workers' Party (PSOE)	Jaime Lissavetzky	Social democracy	30.9%	18	No	
IUCM–LV	List: United Left of the Community of Madrid (IUCM) – Communist Party of Madrid (PCM) – Revolutionary Workers' Party (POR) – Republican Left (IR); The Greens (LV)	Ángel Pérez	Socialism; Communism	8.7%	5	No	
UPyD	List: Union, Progress and Democracy (UPyD)	David Ortega	Social liberalism Radical centrism	Did not contest		No	

== Opinion polls ==
The tables below list opinion polling results in reverse chronological order, showing the most recent first and using the dates when the survey fieldwork was done, as opposed to the date of publication. Where the fieldwork dates are unknown, the date of publication is given instead. The highest percentage figure in each polling survey is displayed with its background shaded in the leading party's colour. If a tie ensues, this is applied to the figures with the highest percentages. The "Lead" column on the right shows the percentage-point difference between the parties with the highest percentages in a poll.

=== Voting intention estimates ===
The table below lists weighted voting intention estimates. Refusals are generally excluded from the party vote percentages, while question wording and the treatment of "don't know" responses and those not intending to vote may vary between polling organisations. When available, seat projections determined by the polling organisations are displayed below (or in place of) the percentages in a smaller font; 29 seats were required for an absolute majority in the City Council of Madrid.

Color key:

Exit poll

Polling firm/Commissioner	Fieldwork date	Sample size	Turnout	PP	PSOE	IUCM–LV	UPyD	Lead
2011 municipal election	22 May 2011	—N/a	67.2	49.7; 31	23.9; 15	10.7; 6	7.9; 5	25.8
Ipsos–Eco/FORTA	22 May 2011	?	?	52.1; 32/33	22.4; 13/15	11.0; 7/8	6.8; 3/4	29.7
Ikerfel/Vocento	15 May 2011	900	?	50.2; 30/31	30.1; 18/19	8.7; 5	6.1; 3	20.1
TNS Demoscopia/Antena 3	14 May 2011	?	?	? 35	? 16	? 6	–	?
Metroscopia/El País	9 May 2011	600	?	52.9; 32/33	31.3; 18/19	8.1; 4/5	5.0; 0/3	21.6
NC Report/La Razón	13–30 Apr 2011	600	?	53.0; 31/33	30.4; 18/19	8.4; 5	5.6; 1/3	22.6
Obradoiro de Socioloxía/Público (Note: "El escándalo del 'caso Gürtel' no pasa factura electoral a Aguirre". Público (in Spanish). 2 May 2011. Archived from the original on 26 August 2011.)	25–28 Apr 2011	599	?	57.2; 34/35	31.2; 18/19	6.7; 4	–	26.0
Sigma Dos/El Mundo	15–18 Apr 2011	400	?	53.5; 32/34	29.8; 18	8.0; 4/5	5.1; 0/3	23.7
CIS	17 Mar–17 Apr 2011	781	?	52.6; 32/34	28.6; 17/18	8.2; 5	4.3; 0/3	24.0
Metroscopia/CEIM (Note: "El PSOE madrileño cosecharía el peor resultado de su historia". Intereconomía (in Spanish). 8 May 2011. Archived from the original on 10 May 2011.)	6–15 Apr 2011	?	?	51.8; 31	31.3; 18	? 5	5.1; 3	20.5
Metroscopia/El País	15 May 2010	500	?	53.4; 32	27.9; 17	9.1; 5	6.0; 3	25.5
2009 EP election	7 Jun 2009	—N/a	53.8	50.1 (32)	34.1 (21)	4.5 (0)	6.8 (4)	16.0
Metroscopia/El País	15 May 2009	400	?	56.3; 34	29.1; 18	8.5; 5	–	27.2
2008 general election	9 Mar 2008	—N/a	80.7	50.6 (33)	38.1 (24)	4.7 (0)	4.0 (0)	12.5
2007 municipal election	27 May 2007	—N/a	65.9	55.6; 34	30.9; 18	8.7; 5	–	24.7

=== Voting preferences ===
The table below lists raw, unweighted voting preferences.

Polling firm/Commissioner	Fieldwork date	Sample size	PP	PSOE	IUCM–LV	UPyD	Question	X mark	Lead
2011 municipal election	22 May 2011	—N/a	32.8	15.8	7.1	5.2	—N/a	32.8	17.0
Obradoiro de Socioloxía/Público	25–28 Apr 2011	599	41.3	23.5	4.7	1.2	–	–	17.8
CIS	17 Mar–17 Apr 2011	781	35.0	20.5	5.2	3.5	22.7	7.9	14.5
2009 EP election (Note: Does not include non-resident citizens.)	7 Jun 2009	—N/a	26.8	18.3	2.4	3.7	—N/a	46.2	8.5
2008 general election	9 Mar 2008	—N/a	40.6	30.6	3.8	3.2	—N/a	19.3	10.0
2007 municipal election	27 May 2007	—N/a	36.5	20.3	5.7	–	—N/a	34.1	16.2

=== Preferred Mayor ===
The table below lists opinion polling on leader preferences to become mayor of Madrid.

Polling firm/Commissioner	Fieldwork date	Sample size					Other/ None/ Not care	Question	Lead
Polling firm/Commissioner	Fieldwork date	Sample size	Gallardón PP	Lissavetzky PSOE	Pérez IUCM	Ortega UPyD	Other/ None/ Not care	Question	Lead
CIS	17 Mar–17 Apr 2011	1,528	38.0	18.7	3.7	0.4	16.8	22.4	19.3

== Results ==
← Summary of the 22 May 2011 City Council of Madrid election results →
Parties and alliances	Popular vote			Seats	
Parties and alliances	Votes	%	±pp	Total	+/−
People's Party (PP)	756,952	49.69	−5.96	31	−3
Spanish Socialist Workers' Party (PSOE)	364,600	23.93	−7.01	15	−3
United Left of the Community of Madrid–The Greens (IUCM–LV)	163,706	10.75	+2.07	6	+1
Union, Progress and Democracy (UPyD)	119,601	7.85	New	5	+5
Ecolo–Greens (Ecolo)^{1}	13,425	0.88	−0.01	0	±0
Citizens for Blank Votes (CenB)	10,795	0.71	New	0	±0
Anti-Bullfighting Party Against Mistreatment of Animals (PACMA)	7,071	0.46	+0.26	0	±0
For a Fairer World (PUM+J)	6,456	0.42	+0.26	0	±0
Spanish Alternative (AES)	4,764	0.31	−0.08	0	±0
Pirate Party (Pirata)	4,631	0.30	New	0	±0
Regeneration (REG)	4,100	0.27	New	0	±0
Spanish Smokers' Party (PARFE)	3,031	0.20	New	0	±0
Citizens–Party of the Citizenry (C's)	2,866	0.19	New	0	±0
The Phalanx (FE)	2,608	0.17	+0.08	0	±0
Family and Life Party (PFyV)	2,381	0.16	+0.07	0	±0
Communist Party of the Peoples of Spain (PCPE)	2,119	0.14	+0.06	0	±0
Humanist Party (PH)	2,047	0.13	+0.01	0	±0
Spanish Phalanx of the CNSO (FE de las JONS)	2,026	0.13	+0.01	0	±0
Party of the Elderly and the Self-employed (PdMA)	1,671	0.11	New	0	±0
Union for Leganés (ULEG)	1,015	0.07	+0.06	0	±0
Internationalist Socialist Workers' Party (POSI)	999	0.07	New	0	±0
Authentic Phalanx (FA)	912	0.06	+0.03	0	±0
Centre and Democracy Forum (CyD)	891	0.06	New	0	±0
Castilian Party (PCAS)^{2}	888	0.06	+0.01	0	±0
Communist Unification of Spain (UCE)	527	0.03	New	0	±0
Blank ballots	43,292	2.84	+0.81		
Total	1,523,374			57	±0
Valid votes	1,523,374	98.18	−1.29		
Invalid votes	28,239	1.82	+1.29		
Votes cast / turnout	1,551,613	67.22	+1.31		
Abstentions	756,747	32.78	−1.31		
Registered voters	2,308,360				
Sources
Footnotes: ^{1} Ecolo–Greens results are compared to The Greens totals in the 2007 election.; ^{2} Castilian Party results are compared to Commoners' Land totals in the 2007 election.

Popular vote
PP	49.69%
PSOE	23.93%
IUCM–LV	10.75%
UPyD	7.85%
Others	4.94%
Blank ballots	2.84%

Seats
PP	54.39%
PSOE	26.32%
IUCM–LV	10.53%
UPyD	8.77%

== Aftermath ==
=== Government formation ===
Investiture
Ballot →	11 June 2011	
Required majority →	29 out of 57	
Alberto Ruiz-Gallardón (PP): • PP (31)	31 / 57	check
Jaime Lissavetzky (PSOE): • PSOE (15)	15 / 57	X mark
Ángel Pérez (IUCM–LV): • IUCM–LV (6)	6 / 57	X mark
David Ortega (UPyD): • UPyD (5)	5 / 57	X mark
Abstentions/Blank ballots	0 / 57	
Absentees	0 / 57	

=== December 2011 investiture ===
Investiture
Ballot →	27 December 2011	
Required majority →	29 out of 57	
Ana Botella (PP): • PP (31)	31 / 57	check
Jaime Lissavetzky (PSOE): • PSOE (15)	15 / 57	X mark
Ángel Pérez (IUCM–LV): • IUCM–LV (6)	6 / 57	X mark
David Ortega (UPyD): • UPyD (5)	5 / 57	X mark
Abstentions/Blank ballots	0 / 57	
Absentees	0 / 57	

== Bibliography ==
- Constitución Española (Constitution). Official State Gazette (in Spanish). 27 December 1978 [version as of 28 August 1992]. BOE-A-1978-31229.
- Ley 7/1985, de 2 de abril, Reguladora de las Bases del Régimen Local (Law 7/1985). Official State Gazette (in Spanish). 2 April 1985 [version as of 5 March 2011]. BOE-A-1985-5392.
- Ley Orgánica 5/1985, de 19 de junio, del Régimen Electoral General (Organic Law 5/1985). Official State Gazette (in Spanish). 19 June 1985 [version as of 30 April 2011]. BOE-A-1985-11672.
- Real Decreto 424/2011, de 28 de marzo, por el que se convocan elecciones locales y a las Asambleas de Ceuta y Melilla para el 22 de mayo de 2011 (Royal Decree 424/2011). Official State Gazette (in Spanish). 28 March 2011. BOE-A-2011-5608.
