= Antonio Miguel Carmona =

Spanish politician

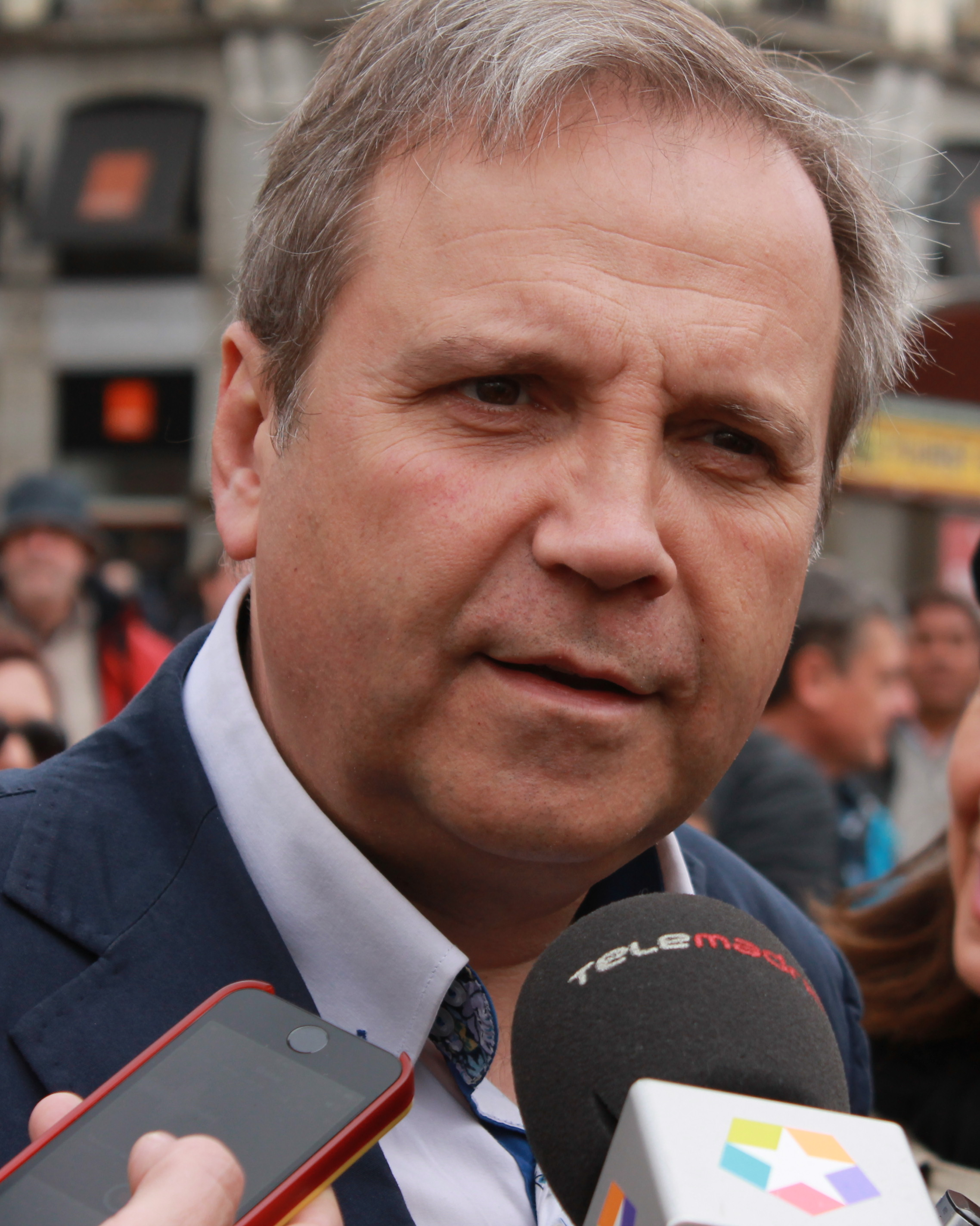

Antonio Miguel Carmona Sancipriano (born 24 January 1963) is a Spanish former politician. A member of the Spanish Socialist Workers' Party (PSOE), he served in the Assembly of Madrid (1999–2002; 2011–2015) and the City Council of Madrid (2015–2019), coming third in the 2015 Madrid City Council election when running for mayor of Madrid.

== Biography ==
Carmona was raised in the Malasaña neighbourhood of Madrid. A professor of economic sciences, he has taught at Complutense University of Madrid, University of California, Berkeley and Universidad CEU San Pablo. He joined the Spanish Socialist Workers' Party (PSOE) in 1986.

Carmona was a member of the Assembly of Madrid from 1999 to 2002 and again from 2011 to 2015. On 6 October 2014, he was confirmed as the PSOE candidate for mayor of Madrid in the 2015 Madrid City Council election. Per the party's rules, there were no primaries as no other candidate collected 20% of members endorsing their campaign. His party fell from second to third place, and from 15 to 9 seats. The PSOE added their support to the 20 councillors from second-place Ahora Madrid, installing Manuela Carmena as mayor and ending 24 years of People's Party (PP) rule in the capital. Weeks after the election, Carmona was stripped of spokesmanship of the party group in the City Council of Madrid by the Spanish Socialist Workers' Party of the Community of Madrid (PSOE-M) and it was handed to Purificación Causapié, who was second on the electoral list.

In March 2018, Carmona said that he would not run in the 2019 Madrid City Council election, but would still be active on the campaign. He became vice president of energy company Iberdrola in October 2021, leaving a year later for executive and communication work in the same corporation.
