= Pablo Soto (software developer) =

Spanish software developer (born 1979)

Pablo Soto Bravo
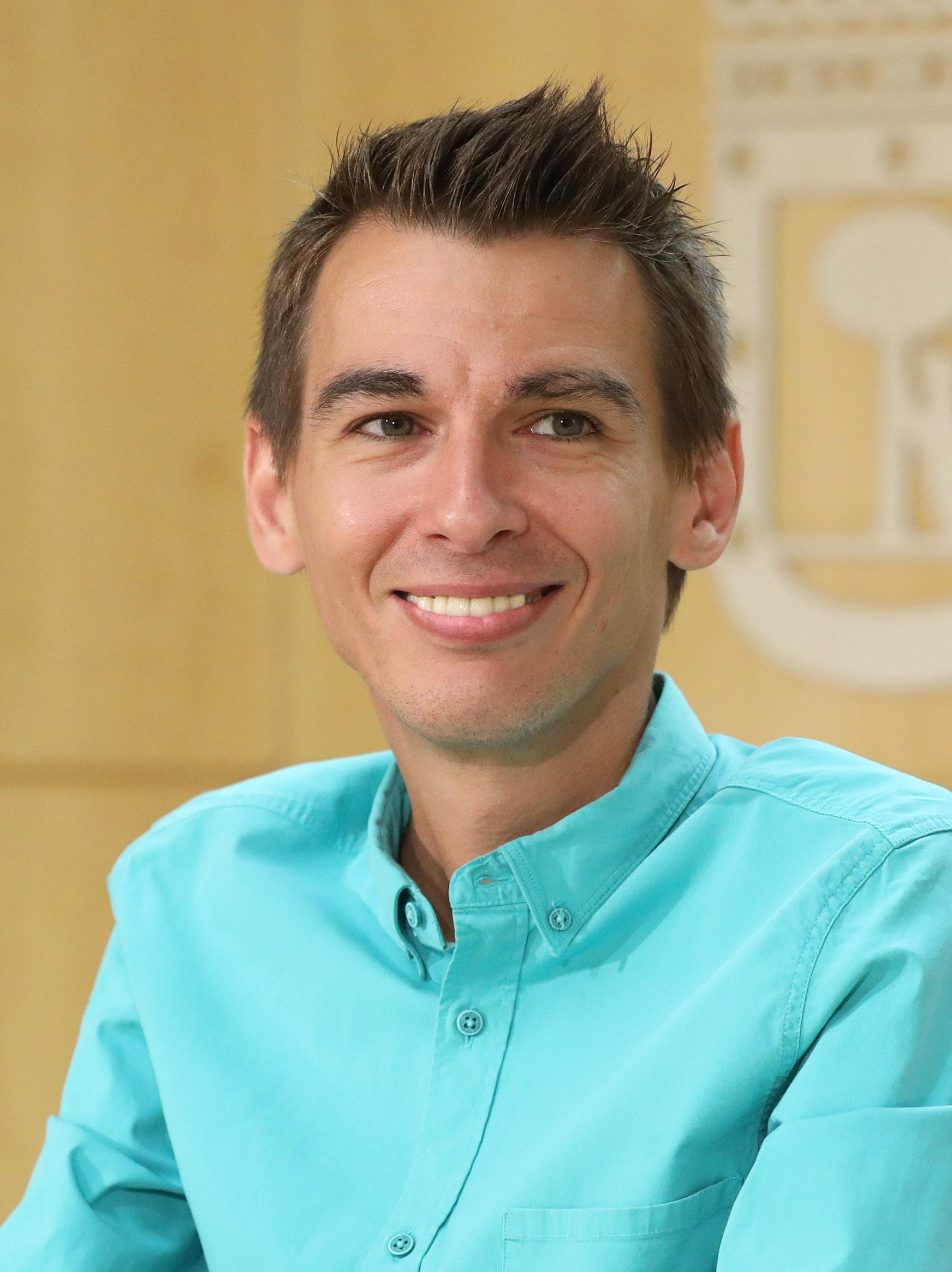
- Pablo Soto in 2018

Municipal Councillor of Madrid
- In office 2015–2019

Personal details
- Born: 1979 (age 46–47) Spain
- Occupation: Software developer, Former municipal councillor
- Known for: Development of .MANOLITO protocol, Blubster, Piolet, and Omemo

Pablo Soto Bravo (born 1979) is a Spanish software developer. He was municipal councillor of Madrid from 2015 to 2019.

In 2001 he developed the .MANOLITO protocol, Blubster, and Piolet - two peer-to-peer file-sharing servants. In May 2006, Soto released Manolito, a third clone application, and new versions of Blubster and Piolet.

He apparently left the MP2P Community in 2004; subsequently, Blubster and Piolet slowly began to lose their user base. By the end of 2004, when discussions on P2Pforums.com were focused on whether or not he had left the community for financial reasons, it was known that he has a rare form of muscular dystrophy, that has forced him to move in wheelchair.

Soto later put his energy into Omemo, an open source peer-to-peer software for storage space sharing (distributed computing).

In June 2008, Warner Music, Universal Music, EMI, Sony and the Spanish association Promusicae filed a lawsuit against his company MP2P Technologies, demanding €13 million for "unfair competition". He was acquitted on the charges of copyright violation in December 2011.

After the 2015 local elections Soto became a member of the City Council of Madrid with Ahora Madrid. He announced plans to promote usage of free software for the municipal software platforms, and as of January 2019 is head of open government for the city. He has launched Decide Madrid, an online platform whereby citizens can propose policy for the city: a proposal supported by a number of users equal to 1 percent of the adult population is put before voters in a referendum. He renounced to his office as city councillor on 8 October 2019, after sexual misconduct allegations.
