= Productores de Música de España =

Spanish music industry trade association

- Promusicae logo as of 2011.
- Formation: 1958
- Type: Licensing and royalties, technical standards
- Headquarters: Madrid, Spain
- Location: Spain
- Website: promusicae.es

Productores de Música de España (English: Spanish Music Producers; shortened as PROMUSICAE) is the national organisation responsible for the music charts of Spain. it is a trade association that represents more than 90% of the Spanish recorded music industry. It is the International Federation of the Phonographic Industry (IFPI) group for Spain. PROMUSICAE is based in Madrid, Spain at Calle María de Molina, 39.

== History ==
Promusicae began in 1958 as a representative of the IFPI in Spain under the name of the Spanish Group of the International Federation of the Phonographic Industry (Grupo Español de la Federación Internacional de la Industria Fonográfica), although not officially an association, since Spanish law during the Franco regime did not recognize the right of association until 1977. In 1978, it was registered as an association under the name Spanish Phonographic Association (Asociación Fonográfica Española) (AFE). In 1982, with the emergence and popularization of the music video, the AFE changed its name to Phonographic and Videographic Association of Spain (Asociación Fonográfica y Videográfica de España) (AFYVE). Finally, in 2004, AFYVE partners adopted the name, Spanish Music Producers (Productores de Música de España), abbreviated PROMUSICAE, which is also a play on words with the Latin expression "pro musicae", which means "for / in favor of the music". The new name was instituted on 1 January 2005.

Since 30 April 2003, Antonio Guisasola has been president of PROMUSICAE, replacing Carlos Grande.

== Charts ==
The charts are calculated once every week on Sundays. They are based on retail music sales within Spain for the week from the preceding Saturday to the Friday prior to calculation. The new charts are usually uploaded to the PROMUSICAE website on Sunday night Spanish continental time. As of January 2015, the Top 100 songs are based on streaming and both download and physical sales.

PROMUSICAE provides the following charts:

- Top 100 Canciones
- Top 100 Álbumes
- Top 100 Vinilos
- Top 50 Radio
- Top 20 compilations chart
- Top 20 DVD Chart
- Airplay Chart
- Top 20 TV and Radio Chart (Annual)

== Certifications ==
Certifications have existed in Spain since the mid-1970s. During this period, both singles and albums had to sell 100,000 copies to qualify for a Gold disk, the only certification awarded at the time.

PROMUSICAE is currently in charge of certifying records in Spain. It certifies Gold and Platinum recordings based on the shipment of albums and the sales of digital downloads.

=== Albums ===
Until 1 November 2005, the certification levels for music albums in Spain were 50,000 copies for Gold and 100,000 for Platinum. The levels were change to 20,000 for Gold and 40,000 for Platinum in November 2011 and are still the same, as of June 2022.

This table contains the certification levels, when the program of Gold and Platinum is operated under PROMUSICAE .

Certification	Before 1 November 2005	Before 6 September 2009	Before 1 November 2011	Since 1 November 2011
Gold	50,000	40,000	30,000	20,000
Platinum	100,000	80,000	60,000	40,000

=== Singles ===
In January 2008, due to a decline in physical singles, PROMUSICAE added to the charts of the physical singles two separate Top 20 charts, one for "Digital downloads" and the other for "Original Tones" (similar to Ringtones). The change was reflected to the certifications as well, and allowed each single title to receive two separate types of certification awards. The two certification formats were combined in January 2009, reflecting, again, the charts becoming a single chart. At the same time, the physical singles chart and certifications were discontinued, and the certification-levels were raised to 20,000 for Gold and 40,000 for Platinum from the previous 10,000/20,000. In 2022, the certification levels were raised to 30,000 and 50,000, respectively. Effective from the 16th week of 2025, the levels were raised to 50,000/100,000.

Physical singles

Certification	Before 1 November 2005	Before 1 April 2007	Since 1 April 2007	Since 1 January 2009
Gold	25,000	10,000	10,000	Discontinued
Platinum	50,000	20,000	25,000	Discontinued

Digital downloads and ringtones (and from 2015, streaming)

Certification	From 2008	From 2009	From 2022	From April 2025
Gold	10,000	20,000	30,000	50,000
Platinum	20,000	40,000	60,000	100,000

Streaming only

Streaming only certifications were instituted in November 2013 at Gold for 4,000,000 streams and Platinum for 8,000,000 and run until January 2015, when they were merged with the digital downloads certification. At the same time, the equivalent certification levels were raised to 5,000,000 and 10,000,000. From 2018, the streaming equivalent levels are no longer listed.

Certification	From November 2013 to 2014
Gold	4,000,000
Platinum	8,000,000

=== Music DVDs ===
In the table below are the certification-levels, when the program of Gold and Platinum is operated under PROMUSICAE .

Certification	
Gold	10,000
Platinum	25,000

== Premios Amigo ==
The Premios Amigo (English: Friends Awards) were annual music awards presented in Spain by PROMUSICAE from 1997 to 2007. It was revived under the name Premios Odeón in from 2020.

== Piracy ==
As a member of International Federation of the Phonographic Industry (IFPI), one of PROMUSICAE's main purposes is to lobby for tougher intellectual property laws to stop music copyright violations.

PROMUSICAE has monitored P2P networks gathering data about its users downloading music. In April 2005, PROMUSICAE claimed that they were monitoring the Kazaa P2P network and they had sent "messages" containing warnings and legal threats to more than 10,000 users. In early 2008, PROMUSICAE started a judicial process against Telefónica, the biggest Spanish Internet service provider, demanding that personal data of Kazaa users they monitored should be handed over to PROMUSICAE, so they can start suing them. The Promusicae v. Telefónica case continued until the European Court of Justice ruled that Telefónica did not have an obligation to hand user data over to PROMUSICAE.

In June 2008, PROMUSICAE sued Pablo Soto, developer of Manolito P2P, Blubster, and Piolet. PROMUSICAE claimed that Pablo Soto was engaging in unfair competition and demanded €13 million in damages.

PROMUSICAE is one of the founders of La Coalición de Creadores e Industrias de Contenidos, a group of companies whose mission is changing Spanish law to be able to prosecute file-sharing.

== See also ==
- International Federation of the Phonographic Industry
- List of number-one hits in Spain
