= David Ortega (politician) =

Spanish politician and jurist

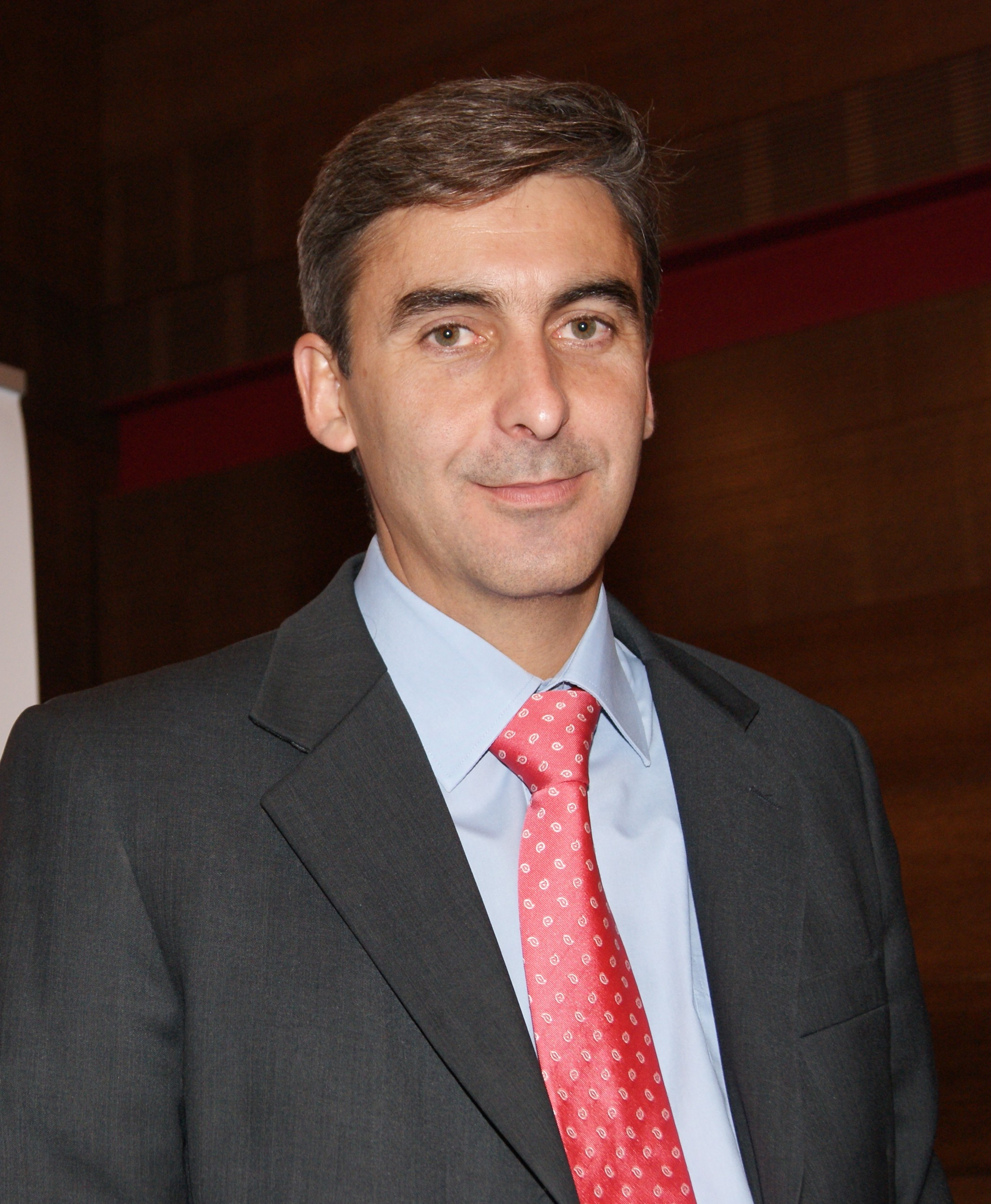

David Ortega Gutiérrez (born 1966) is a Spanish academic and former politician. He served on the City Council of Madrid from 2011 to 2015, as leader of the Union, Progress and Democracy (UPyD) group.

== Biography ==
Ortega was born in Madrid and raised in its Estrella neighbourhood. He graduated in law from the Autonomous University of Madrid and completed a doctorate in political sciences at the same institution, with studies at the University of Oxford, Georgetown University and McMaster University along the way. He has a further master's degree in philosophy from the Francisco de Vitoria University and was a substitute judge in Torrejón de Ardoz from 2000 to 2001. He became a professor of constitutional law at the King Juan Carlos University.

Ortega attended the first congress of Union, Progress and Democracy (UPyD) in November 2009. A year later, he was chosen as their nominee for mayor of Madrid in the 2011 Madrid City Council election. His party came fourth with 7.85% of the vote, earning five seats on the council.

During his term in office, Ortega and his party returned the official cars and chauffeurs granted to them, as per their campaign promises. He also opposed Madrid's candidacy for the 2020 Summer Olympics, citing a survey showing 76% opposition across the capital.

Ortega retained his candidacy for the 2015 Madrid City Council election, taking over 80% of votes cast, though just over a quarter of registered UPyD members voted. The party lost all its seats and he left its national executive. He left the party fully at the end of 2015, saying that it had failed in the general election by its own errors.
