= Mauricio Valiente =

Spanish politician

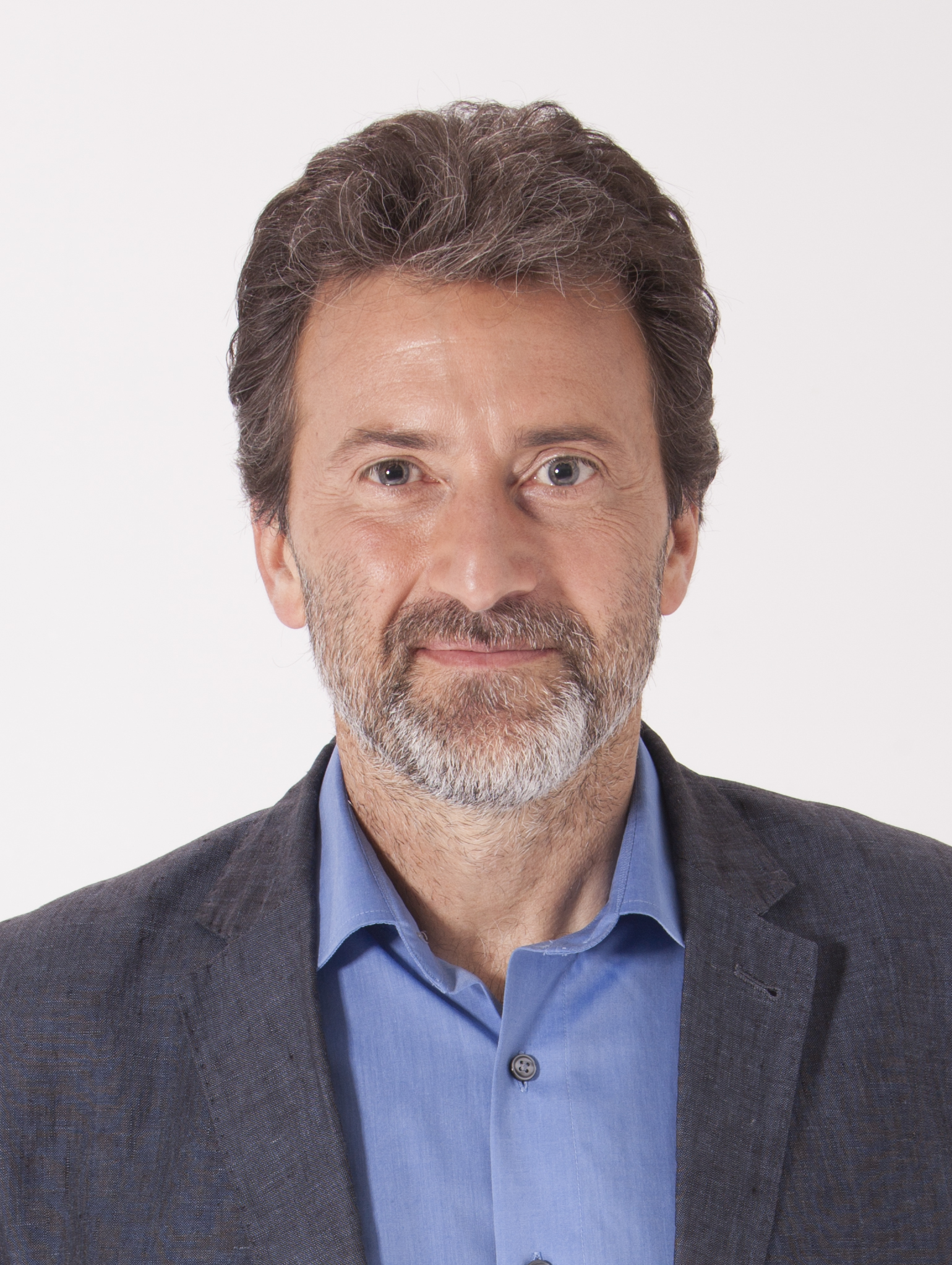

Madrid city councillor
- In office 13 June 2015 – 13 June 2019

Member of the Assembly of Madrid
- In office 7 June 2011 – 31 March 2015

Personal details
- Born: 31 August 1966 (age 60) Madrid
- Citizenship: Spanish
- Party: IU, PCE
- Education: UCM; UC3M
- Occupation: Lawyer, politician

Mauricio Valiente Ots (born 1966) is a Spanish lawyer, activist and politician, member of United Left (IU) and the Communist Party of Spain (PCE). 3rd deputy Mayor of the Madrid City Council and councillor-president of the Chamartín District from 2015 to 2019, he was a member of the 9th Assembly of Madrid.

== Early life ==
Born on 31 August 1966 in Chamartín, Madrid. Active in the student movement and a member of the Communist Youth since 1985. he is a member of the Communist Party of Spain (PCE). He graduated in law at the Complutense University of Madrid (UCM) and obtained his PhD in the same area at the Charles III University of Madrid (UC3M). In his capacity as lawyer he specialised in the area of asylum seeking, immigration and human rights, and worked for several years at the Comisión Española de Ayuda al Refugiado (CEAR). He has also worked as associate professor for the UC3M.

== Regional MP ==
Included in the 9th slot of the United Left–The Greens (IU-LV) for the May 2011 regional election, headed by Gregorio Gordo Pradel, he was elected member of the 9th term of the regional legislature (2011–2015), in which he held the attached spokesmanship of the United Left–The Greens parliamentary group in the Commission of Social Affairs.

== Primary elections of IU-CM and Ahora Madrid ==
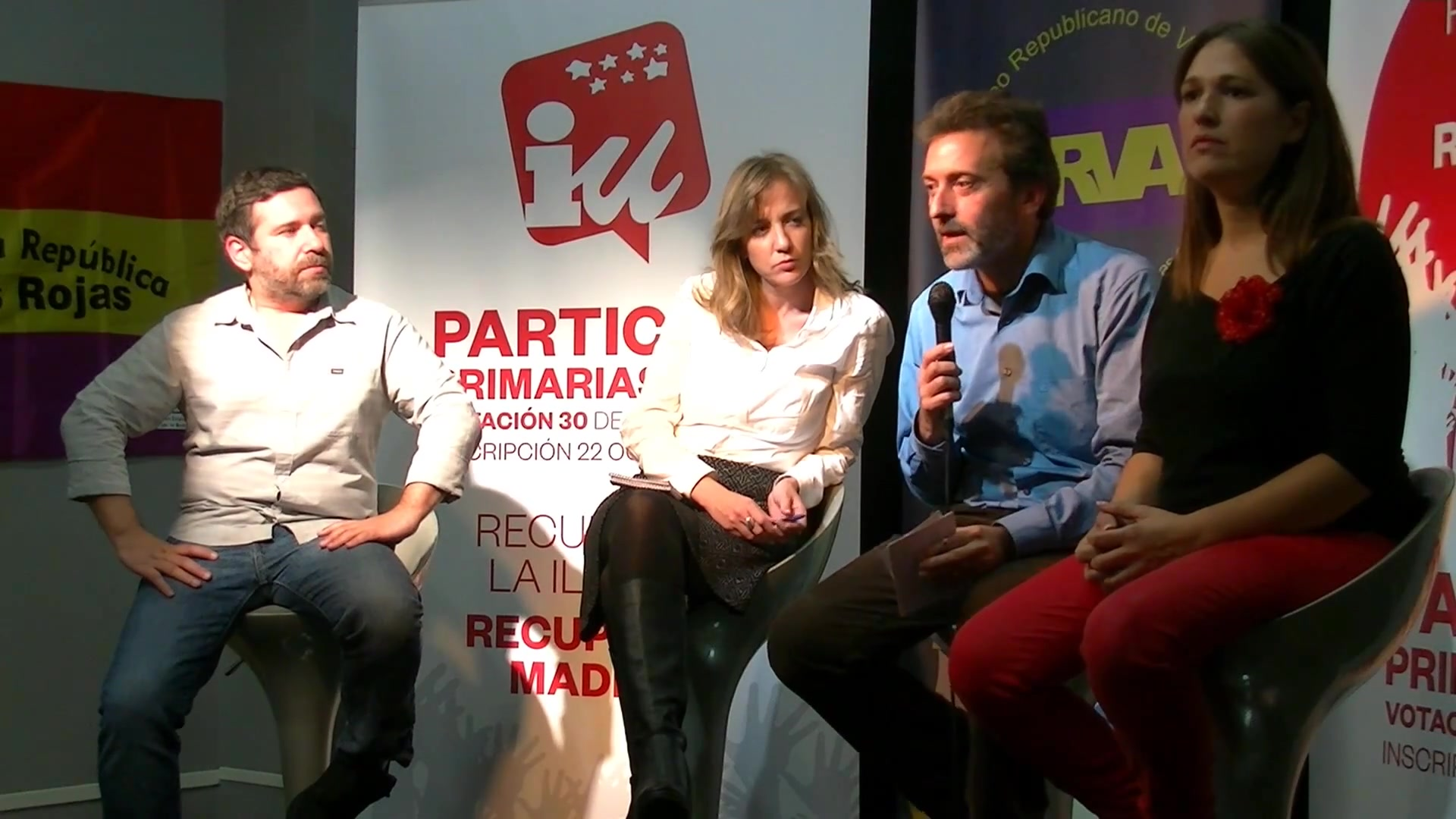
Valiente intervening in an IU event in November 2014, along Javier Couso, Tania Sánchez and María Espinosa.

In November 2014 he presented as IU candidate (in a City Council-regional Government tandem along Tania Sánchez) for the Mayorship of Madrid in an IU-CM internal process. His candidature, linked to the critic faction, defended the merging of IU-CM with other organizations in the electoral list. Despite winning the primary election on 30 November 2014, their plan to subsume within another list was not accepted, and he was forced to leave the organization, being replaced by Raquel López as IU-CM head list. This IU-CM move was later disallowed by the IU federal board. Valiente joined the primary process of Ahora Madrid for the municipal election.

== City councillor ==
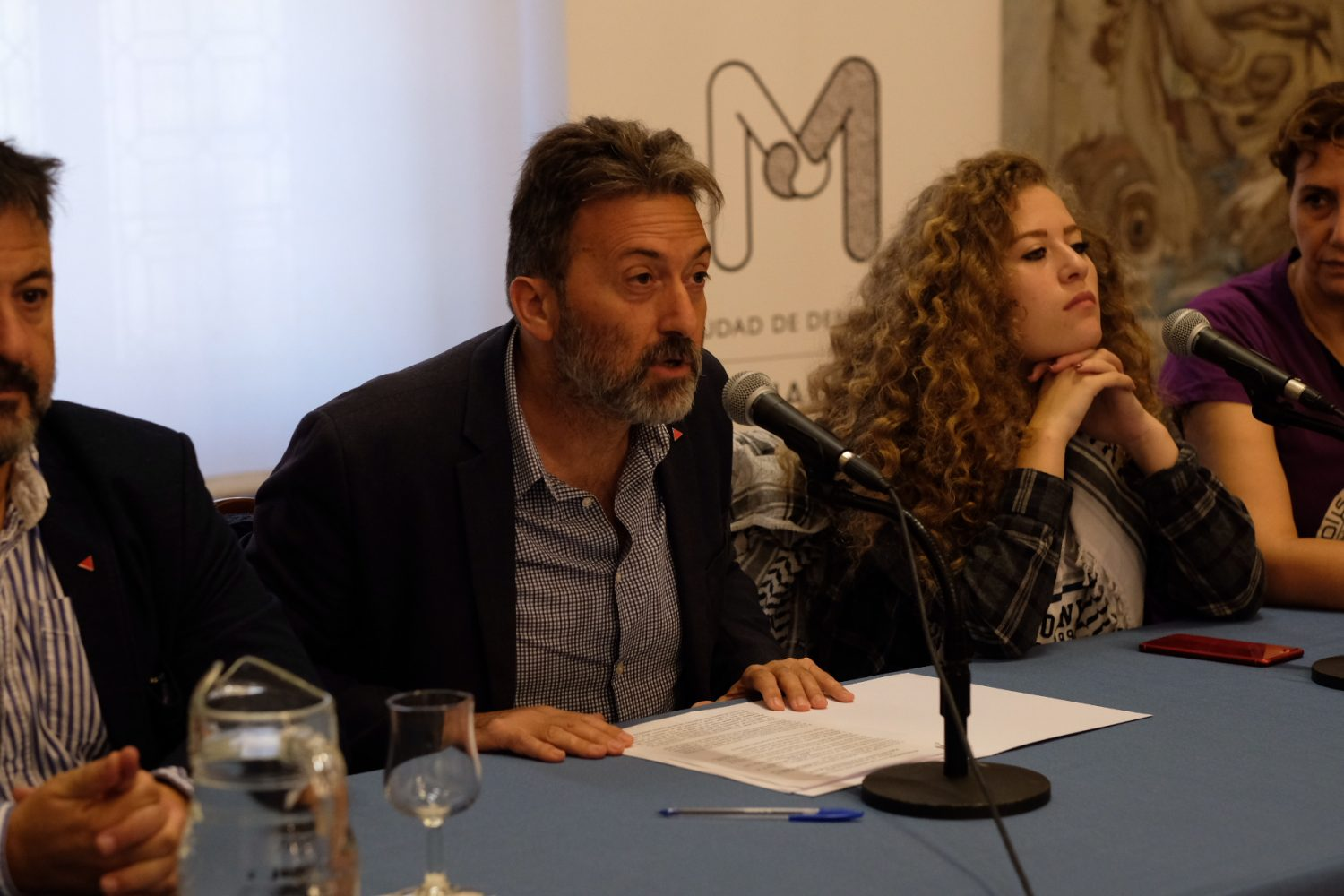
Valiente in September 2018 during Ahed Tamimi's visit to Madrid.

Finally included in the 4th slot of the Ahora Madrid list for the 2015 municipal election, Valiente was elected city councillor for the 2015–2019 corporation. Following the investiture as Mayor of Manuela Carmena, Valiente became 3rd deputy Mayor and president of the Chamartín District.

Following the ejection of IU-CM from IU in June 2015, and the subsequent constitution of United Left Madrid (IU-M) in 2016, Valiente was elected co-spokesman of the later in a primary election ex-aequo with Chus Alonso, Mayor of Ciempozuelos. In another primary election that took place in September–October 2018, Valiente was elected leader of IU in the electoral list for the 2019 municipal election, although the party planned its will for subsuming it within a wider list with other organizations. As the IU–Madrid membership decided in a referendum not to run in the regional election under the Unidas Podemos coalition, Valiente renounced to run as IU candidate in the Madrid En Pie Municipalista primary election to conform a list for the municipal election between members of IU, Anticapitalistas Madrid and Bancada Municipalista; Carlos Sánchez Mato assumed the challenge.
