= Eduardo Garzón =

Spanish economist

Eduardo Garzón Espinosa
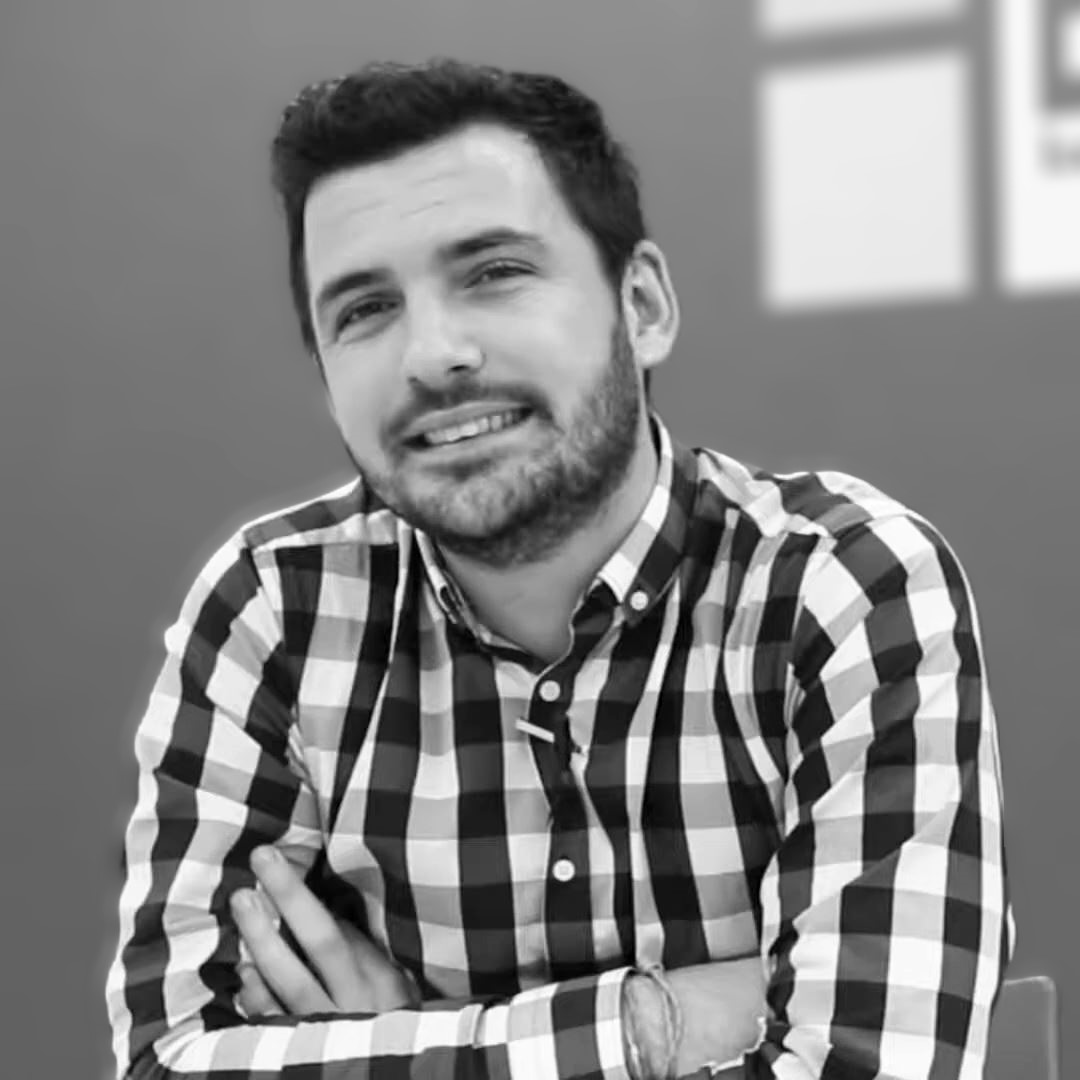
- Born: 7 January 1988 (age 38); Logroño, Spain
- Occupations: Economist, professor, researcher

Academic background
- Education: Economy

Academic work
- Main interests: Heterodox economics, Modern monetary theory, Universal basic income, Job guarantee, History of money

Eduardo Garzón Espinosa (born 1988) is a Spanish economist and university assistant professor.

== Biography ==
Eduardo Garzón was born in Logroño in 1988. He is the brother of Alberto Garzón.

He studied Economics and Business Administration and Management at the University of Málaga. He completed a master's degree in International Economics and Development at the Complutense University of Madrid, completing his doctorate at the Autonomous University of Madrid.

He was economic adviser to the Madrid City Council in the area of Carlos Sánchez Mato during the mandate of Manuela Carmena.

He is currently an assistant professor at the Autonomous University of Madrid.

He is a member of the Scientific Council of ATTAC Spain. He regularly collaborates with different media, such as ElDiario.es, La Marea, El Jueves, Telecinco, TVE or LaSexta, in addition to having a blog on economics: Saque de esquina.

== Books ==
- Garzón Espinosa, Eduardo (2024). Modern Monetary Theory: A Comprehensive and Constructive Criticism. Taylor & Francis. ISBN 9781032443652.
- Garzón Espinosa, Eduardo (2021). La otra economía que no nos quieren contar: Teoría Monetaria Moderna para principiantes (in Spanish). Akal. ISBN 9788446051305.
- Garzón Espinosa, Eduardo; Sánchez Mato, Carlos (2019). 919 Días ¡Sí Se podía!: Cómo el Ayuntamiento de Madrid puso la economía al servicio de la gente (in Spanish). Akal. ISBN 9788446048633.
- Garzón Espinosa, Eduardo (2017). Desmontando los mitos económicos de la derecha: Guía para que no te la den con queso (in Spanish). Península. ISBN 9788499426013.
