= Miguel Sebastián Gascón =

Spanish politician and economist

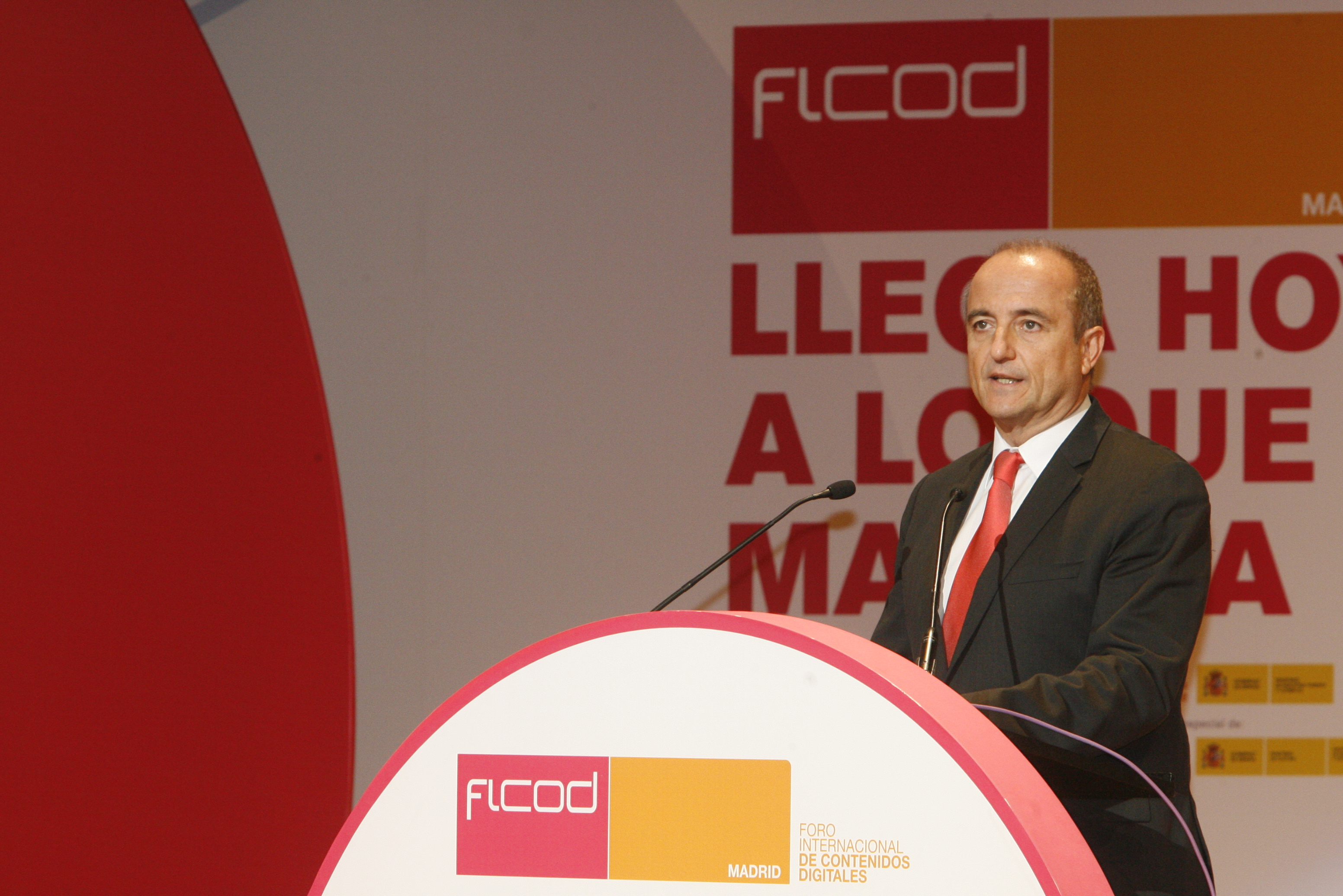
Miguel Sebastián in 2010.

Miguel Sebastián Gascón (Madrid, 13 May 1957) is a Spanish politician and economist. He was a former member of the Spanish cabinet serving as Minister of Industry, Trade and Tourism between 2008 and 2011.

Sebastián Gascón served as Zapatero's personal economic adviser from 2004. Before that he was a professor at the Complutense University of Madrid.

On October 25, 2006 Sebastián Gascón was personally chosen by Prime Minister José Luis Rodríguez Zapatero as socialist candidate for the Madrid Mayoral elections in 2007 however he lost to the People's Party (PP) former Mayor of Madrid Alberto Ruiz-Gallardón.

== Electric vehicles ==
In 2008, as Minister of Industry, Sebastián Gascón announced the Spanish government was implementing a plan to help put 1 million electric cars on the road by 2014, as part of the government's plan to save energy and boost energy efficiency, stating "the electric vehicle is the future and the engine of an industrial revolution".

== Other activities ==
- Indra Sistemas, Independent Member of the Board of Directors (since 2019)

== See also ==
- Instituto para la Diversificación y Ahorro de la Energía
- Ministry of Industry (Spain)

Preceded by Joan Clos	Minister of Industry, Trade and Tourism; 2008 – 2011	Succeeded by José Manuel Soria
