= Ganemos Madrid =

Ganemos Madrid (Spanish for Let's Win Madrid) was a political movement in Madrid with a candidature represented in the municipal council. Alongside other Ganemos groups around Spain, many of its claimed principles are aligned with municipalism.

== History ==
Ganemos Madrid was born on June 28, 2014, from the Municipalia discussion space, which was primarily a location to discuss the creation of a “citizen candidacy” to be presented at the 2015 municipal elections... It was proposed by the Movement for Democracy and its manifesto was signed on October 1, 2014.

In conjunction with Podemos, Ganemos Madrid created Ahora Madrid, which is an “instrumental party” to stand for municipal elections. More specifically, it is a candidature which allows anyone who wishes to participate, including voting for and proposing specific policies desired prior to the election. It puts representatives of parties Equo, Podemos, and part of Izquierda Unida into the same pool and allows all citizens to vote from among them. It also is crowdfunded, requires participating politicians to sign a code of ethics, and uses a Dowdall ranked voting system. In 2015, Ahora Madrid won 20 of 57 seats and formed a minority government (backed by PSOE) with Manuela Carmena as mayor.

Ganemos Madrid has workgroups for specific issues corresponding to (1) social rights, (2) economy and debt, (3) city and urban ecology, and (4) local democracy. Each group holds a weekly meeting at which all citizens are welcome to participate.

== Projects ==
Ganemos Madrid has supported initiatives against remnants of a positive historical memory of Francoist Spain. For example, it has promoted the removal of 47 pro-Francoist street names in Madrid. Furthermore, it more broadly argued against the fact that the unelected Commissioner of the city of Madrid is the one making decisions about historical justice. Despite arguments from outlets like El País that Ganemos Madrid is in so doing only deepening ideological boundaries between the left and right, Ganemos Madrid has responded that they will continue to speak out .

As with many Ganemos groups, they also pursue municipalization. For example, they want the city council to take back full control of garbage collection
