= Ángel Pérez Martínez =

Spanish politician (born 1954)

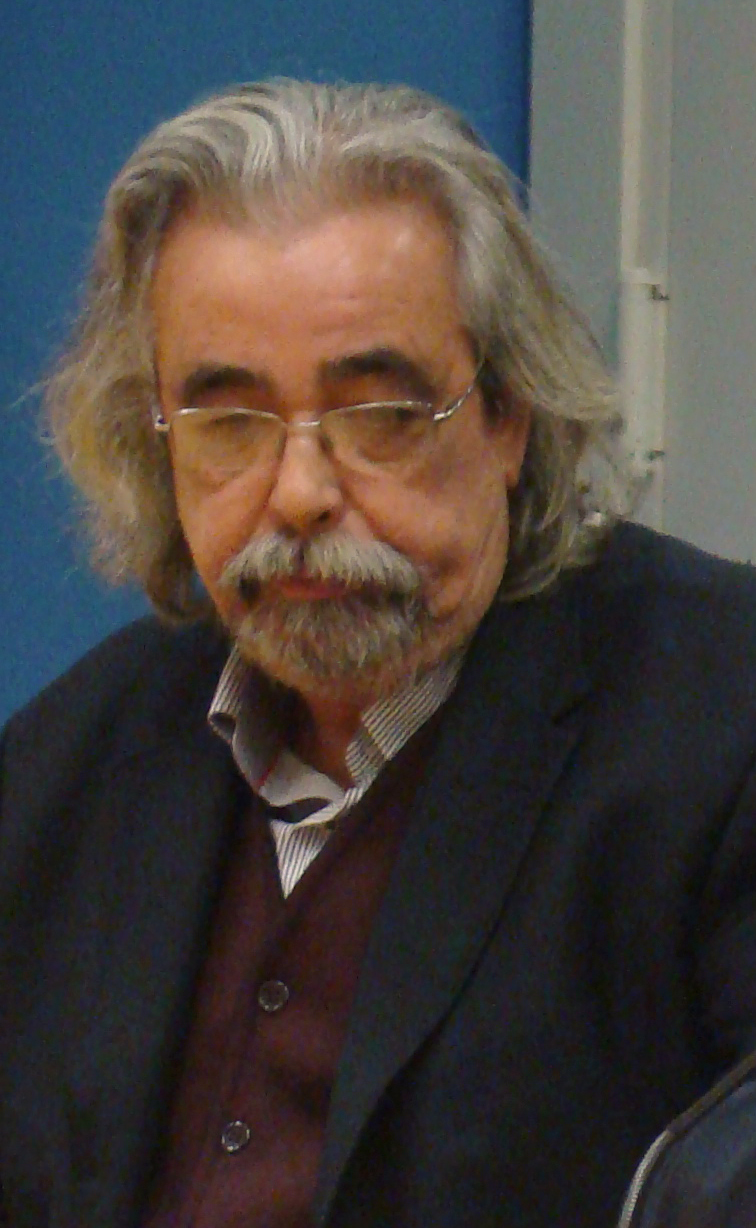
Pérez in 2013

Ángel Pérez Martínez (born 2 October 1954) is a Spanish United Left (IU) politician. He is the organisation's spokesman on Madrid City Council, after having developed different positions inside the organisation. He is also a member of the Communist Party of Spain(PCE).

Ángel Pérez was born in Madrid on 2 October 1954. He is married and has two children. He has a professional qualification as industrial chemistry officer and worked in the Madrid Metro as a driver before entering professional politics. He is also a member of the Workers' Commissions trade union.

Pérez joined the PCE in 1972, leaving the party in the 1980s to join the Communist Party of the Peoples of Spain (PCPE) where he reached the position of Central Committee Organisational Secretary. At the end of the 1980s Pérez together with most of the PCPE rejoined the PCE. In 1992, he was elected General Secretary of the Communist Party of Madrid (PCE's Federation in the Community of Madrid) a position which he retained until 1997. In 1993, he was elected General Coordinator of IU of the Community of Madrid (IU-CM).

In 1995, Pérez was IU's candidate for President of Madrid obtaining 16.02% of the votes and 17 seats in the Madrid Assembly that being one of the IU's best results in the Community of Madrid. As a deputy Pérez was leader of the IU parliamentary group. In 1999, Pérez stood again but the IU vote fell to 7.86% of the votes and 8 seats. In 2001, Pérez resigned from his position as General Coordinator of IU-CM but continued as leader in the Assembly and continued as the Federation's strong man. In the 2004 general election Perez was second on the Madrid List for IU and was elected. In 2007, Perez was chosen as candidate for Mayor of Madrid in the 2007 local elections. In the elections IU obtained 8.68% of the votes and 5 councillors, making him the spokesman in the city council and resigning from his position as a deputy.
