= 2015 Madrid municipal election =

Election in the Spanish municipality of Madrid

- 24 May 2015

All 57 seats in the City Council of Madrid 29 seats needed for a majority
- Opinion polls
- Registered: 2,386,120 ▲3.4%
- Turnout: 1,644,093 (68.9%) ▲1.7 pp
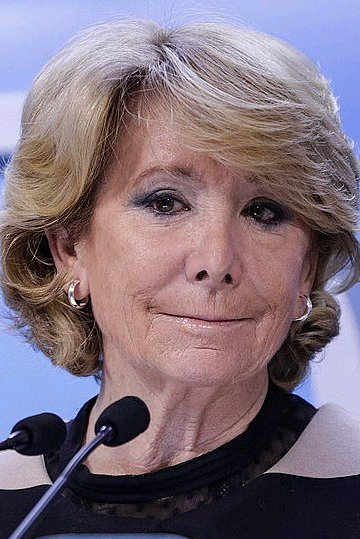

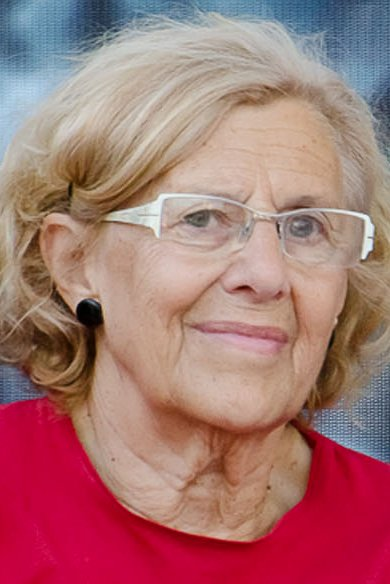

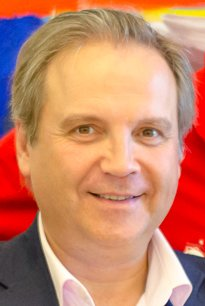

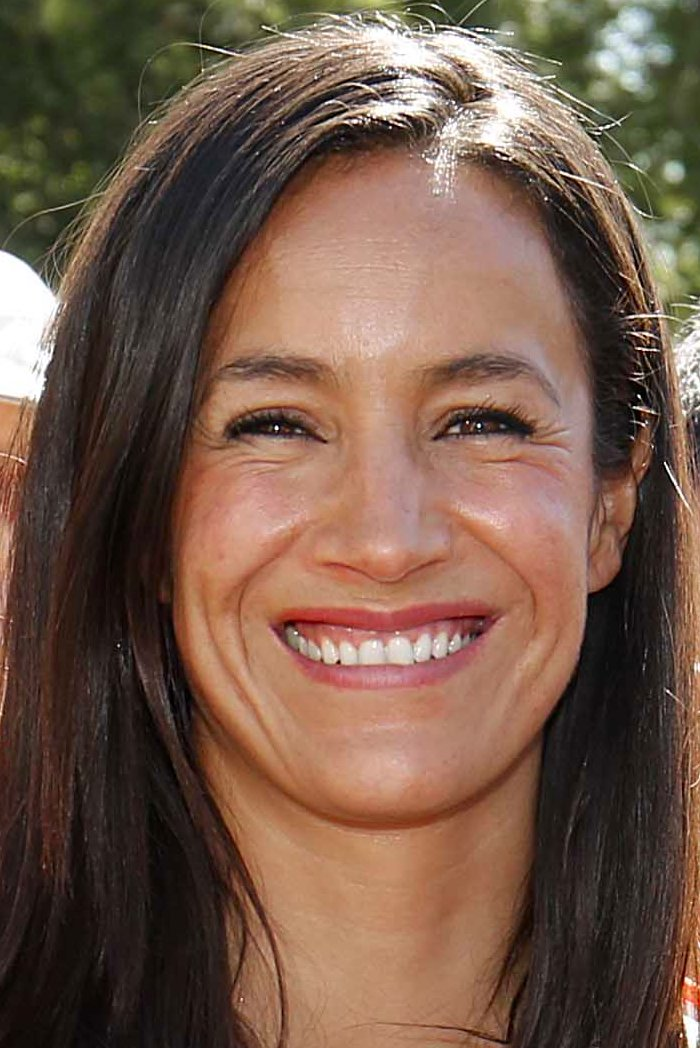

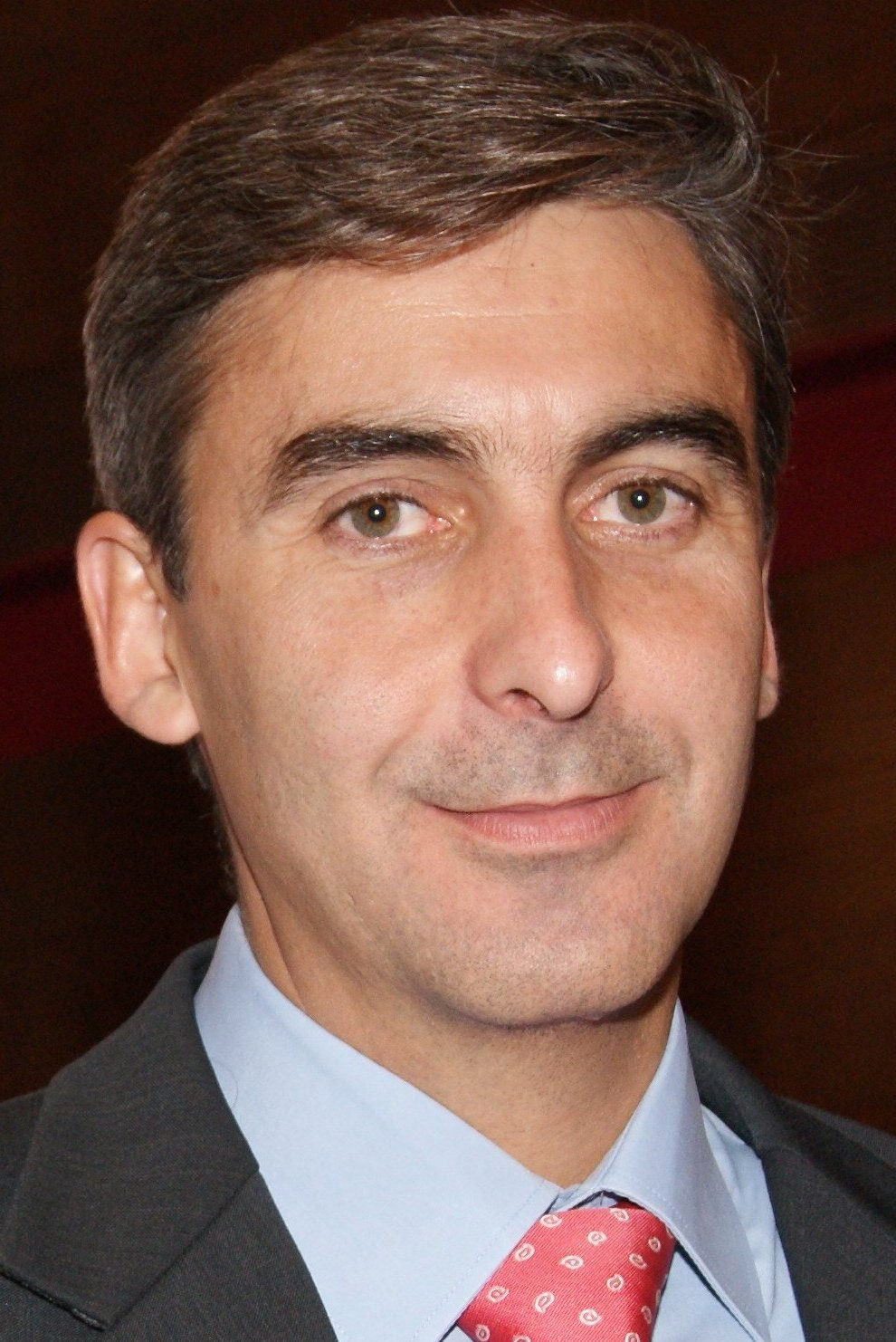

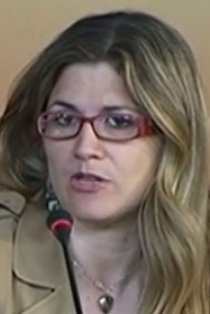
	First party	Second party	Third party
Leader	Esperanza Aguirre	Manuela Carmena	Antonio Miguel Carmona
Party	PP	Ahora Madrid	PSOE
Leader since	6 March 2015	30 March 2015	6 October 2014
Last election	31 seats, 49.7%	Did not contest	15 seats, 23.9%
Seats won	21	20	9
Seat change	▼10	▲20	▼6
Popular vote	564,154	519,721	249,286
Percentage	34.6%	31.8%	15.3%
Swing	▼15.1 pp	New party	▼8.6 pp
	Fourth party	Fifth party	Sixth party
Leader	Begoña Villacís	David Ortega	Raquel López
Party	C's	UPyD	IUCM–LV
Leader since	2 March 2015	9 October 2010	26 March 2015
Last election	0 seats, 0.2%	5 seats, 7.9%	6 seats, 10.7%
Seats won	7	0	0
Seat change	▲7	▼5	▼6
Popular vote	186,487	29,812	27,651
Percentage	11.4%	1.8%	1.7%
Swing	▲11.2 pp	▼6.1 pp	▼9.0 pp
Mayor before election
Ana Botella
PP
Mayor after election
Manuela Carmena
Ahora Madrid

A municipal election was held in Madrid on 24 May 2015 to elect the 10th City Council of the municipality. All 57 seats in the City Council were up for election. It was held concurrently with regional elections in thirteen autonomous communities and local elections all across Spain.

Leading the People's Party (PP) local list was Esperanza Aguirre, former president of the Community of Madrid (2003–2012), president of the Senate of Spain (1999–2002) and minister of Education and Culture (1996–1999), as well as the leader of the regional PP branch since 2004. Mayor Ana Botella, who succeeded Alberto Ruiz-Gallardón early into his term in December 2011, had declined re-election in September 2014. The election was an unexpectedly close race between Aguirre's PP and former judge Manuela Carmena's Podemos-supported Ahora Madrid (English: Madrid Now) platform. The collapse in the PP vote and the loss of its absolute majority allowed Carmena to gain power through an alliance with the Spanish Socialist Workers' Party (PSOE), resulting in the first left-wing government in the city since 1989.

The PSOE suffered heavily from tactical voting to Ahora Madrid after it became apparent throughout the campaign that the left-of-centre vote was coalescing around Carmena's coalition. The newcomer liberal Citizens (Spanish: Ciudadanos) party also entered the City Council for the first time, collecting votes disenchanted with the PP and replacing Union, Progress and Democracy (UPyD) as the main centrist local force. United Left (IU) fell below the 5% threshold and failed to gain any representation for the first time in history.

== Overview ==
Under the 1978 Constitution, the governance of municipalities in Spain—part of the country's local government system—was centered on the figure of city councils (Spanish: ayuntamientos), local corporations with independent legal personality composed of a mayor, a government council and an elected legislative assembly. The mayor was indirectly elected by the local assembly, requiring an absolute majority; otherwise, the candidate from the most-voted party automatically became mayor (ties were resolved by drawing lots). In the case of Madrid, the top-tier administrative and governing body was the City Council of Madrid.

=== Date ===
The term of local assemblies in Spain expired four years after the date of their previous election, with election day being fixed for the fourth Sunday of May every four years. The election decree was required to be issued no later than 54 days before the scheduled election date and published on the following day in the Official State Gazette (BOE). The previous local elections were held on 22 May 2011, setting the date for election day on the fourth Sunday of May four years later, which was 24 May 2015.

Local assemblies could not be dissolved before the expiration of their term, except in cases of mismanagement that seriously harmed the public interest and implied a breach of constitutional obligations, in which case the Council of Ministers could—optionally—decide to call a by-election.

Elections to the assemblies of local entities were officially called on 31 March 2015 with the publication of the corresponding decree in the BOE, setting election day for 24 May.

=== Electoral system ===
Voting for local assemblies was based on universal suffrage, comprising all Spanish nationals over 18 years of age, registered and residing in the municipality and with full political rights (provided that they had not been deprived of the right to vote by a final sentence, nor were legally incapacitated), as well as resident non-national European citizens, and those whose country of origin allowed reciprocal voting by virtue of a treaty.

Local councillors were elected using the D'Hondt method and closed-list proportional voting, with a five percent-threshold of valid votes (including blank ballots) in each municipality. Each municipality was a multi-member constituency, with a number of seats based on the following scale:

Population	Councillors
<100	3
101–250	5
251–1,000	7
1,001–2,000	9
2,001–5,000	11
5,001–10,000	13
10,001–20,000	17
20,001–50,000	21
50,001–100,000	25
>100,001	+1 per each 100,000 inhabitants or fraction +1 if total is an even number

The law did not provide for by-elections to fill vacant seats; instead, any vacancies arising after the proclamation of candidates and during the legislative term were filled by the next candidates on the party lists or, when required, by designated substitutes.

== Parties and candidates ==
The electoral law allowed for parties and federations registered in the interior ministry, alliances and groupings of electors to present lists of candidates. Parties and federations intending to form an alliance were required to inform the relevant electoral commission within 10 days of the election call, whereas groupings of electors needed to secure the signature of a determined amount of the electors registered in the municipality for which they sought election, disallowing electors from signing for more than one list. In the case of Madrid, as its population was over 1,000,001, at least 8,000 signatures were required. Additionally, a balanced composition of men and women was required in the electoral lists, so that candidates of either sex made up at least 40 percent of the total composition.

Below is a list of the main parties and alliances which contested the election:

Candidacy	Parties and alliances	Leading candidate	Ideology	Previous result		Gov.	Ref.
Candidacy	Parties and alliances	Leading candidate	Ideology	Vote %	Seats	Gov.	Ref.
PP	List: People's Party (PP)	Esperanza Aguirre	Conservatism; Christian democracy	49.7%	31	Yes	
PSOE	List: Spanish Socialist Workers' Party (PSOE)	Antonio Miguel Carmona	Social democracy	23.9%	15	No	
IUCM–LV	List: United Left of the Community of Madrid (IUCM) – The Dawn Marxist Organization (La Aurora (OM)) – Republican Left (IR) – Open Left (IzAb); The Greens (LV)	Raquel López	Socialism; Communism	10.7%	6	No	
UPyD	List: Union, Progress and Democracy (UPyD)	David Ortega	Social liberalism Radical centrism	7.9%	5	No	
C's	List: Citizens–Party of the Citizenry (C's)	Begoña Villacís	Liberalism	0.2%	0	No	
Ahora; Madrid	List: We Can (Podemos); Let's Win Madrid (Ganemos Madrid); Communist Party of Madrid (PCM); Equo (Equo); Assembly for Madrid (CxM); For a Fairer World (PUM+J)	Manuela Carmena	Progressivism; Participatory democracy	Did not contest		No	

== Campaign ==
Electoral debates were held in Telemadrid between the candidates of the PP, PSOE, IU, UPyD, Vox, Citizens and Ahora Madrid in the last week of campaign, between 18 and 20 May. The most expected and tense moment came with the debate between PP candidate Esperanza Aguirre and AM Manuela Carmena, as the most-likely candidates to become the next Mayor of the city. Aguirre immediately accused Carmena of saying in the past that "ETA members had suffered a lot", trying to link the former judge with the terrorist group, as well as trying to discredit Carmena's career in the judiciary, which was seen as a furious attack of Aguirre on Carmena. The latter, visibly surprised, counterattacked responding that Aguirre was acting arrogantly and contemptuous to others and accusing her of allowing corruption to spread during her tenure as president of Madrid. "Please go, you've caused a lot of harm" said Carmena to Aguirre.

In the last days of the campaign, especially following her debate with Aguirre, several celebrities such as actors Pilar Bardem, Carlos Bardem, Loles León, Goya Toledo, Paco León, playwright Cristina Rota, lawyer and former politician Cristina Almeida and journalist Ernesto Ekaizer expressed their support for Carmena's candidacy, with actress Eva Hache going on to say through the Twitter social network that "I don't know if we are Manuela but surely we are not the other [in reference to Aguirre]. VOTE." Carmena had also received the support of dozens of artists who created drawings in support of Carmena's and Ahora Madrid candidacy, with the drawings themselves becoming viral in the social networks. Following the Telemadrid debate, after which Aguirre was highly criticised for her aggressive behaviour towards Carmena, supporters cast the drawings next to Aguirre's home in Malasaña. On 21 May, a Carmena's act in the center of Madrid exceeded its capacity, originally scheduled for 800 people, resulting in the closing of a street and in Carmena herself apologizing to the around 1,500 people outside that were not able to enter.

== Opinion polls ==
The tables below list opinion polling results in reverse chronological order, showing the most recent first and using the dates when the survey fieldwork was done, as opposed to the date of publication. Where the fieldwork dates are unknown, the date of publication is given instead. The highest percentage figure in each polling survey is displayed with its background shaded in the leading party's colour. If a tie ensues, this is applied to the figures with the highest percentages. The "Lead" column on the right shows the percentage-point difference between the parties with the highest percentages in a poll.

=== Voting intention estimates ===
The table below lists weighted voting intention estimates. Refusals are generally excluded from the party vote percentages, while question wording and the treatment of "don't know" responses and those not intending to vote may vary between polling organisations. When available, seat projections determined by the polling organisations are displayed below (or in place of) the percentages in a smaller font; 29 seats were required for an absolute majority in the City Council of Madrid.

Color key:

Poll conducted after legal ban on opinion polls Exit poll

Polling firm/Commissioner	Fieldwork date	Sample size	Turnout	PP	PSOE	IUCM–LV	UPyD	C's	Podemos	Ganemos	Ahora Madrid	Lead
2015 municipal election	24 May 2015	—N/a	68.9	34.6; 21	15.3; 9	1.7; 0	1.8; 0	11.4; 7	(Note: Within Ahora Madrid.)		31.8; 20	2.8
TNS Demoscopia/RTVE–FORTA	24 May 2015	?	?	31.9; 19/22	15.5; 9/10	2.0; 0	1.5; 0	10.8; 6/7			33.8; 20/23	1.9
GAD3/Antena 3	11–22 May 2015	?	?	? 21/23	? 9/10	–	–	? 7/8			? 17/19	?
PP	20 May 2015	?	?	? 21	? 11	? 3	–	? 9			? 13	?
Idea Nomina Data/Público	17 May 2015	1,000	?	34.0– 36.0; 21/24	17.0– 19.0; 10/12	3.0– 4.5; 0	1.5– 2.5; 0	15.0– 17.0; 9/11			22.0– 25.0; 14/15	11.0– 12.0
Metroscopia/El País	13–14 May 2015	1,000	70	29.7; 19	17.2; 11	4.3; 0	0.8; 0	16.4; 10			27.8; 17	1.9
NC Report/La Razón	13–14 May 2015	600	?	35.2; 23	20.1; 13	4.1; 0	2.8; 0	16.2; 10			16.9; 11	15.1
Sigma Dos/El Mundo	12–13 May 2015	800	?	36.4; 22/24	19.2; 12/13	4.6; 0	1.6; 0	14.7; 9			20.2; 12/13	16.2
JM&A/Público	12 May 2015	?	?	? 22	? 12	–	–	? 10			? 13	?
Sigma Dos/Mediaset	4–7 May 2015	?	?	36.9; 23/25	20.3; 12/13	3.6; 0	1.3; 0	16.1; 10			17.6; 10/11	16.6
MyWord/Cadena SER	29 Apr–6 May 2015	801	?	34.4; 21/23	17.6; 10/12	2.9; 0/3	1.1; 0	17.0; 10/11			21.6; 13	12.8
JM&A/Público	3 May 2015	?	?	33.4; 21	20.3; 12	5.4; 3	1.2; 0	15.3; 9			20.5; 12	12.9
InvyMark/laSexta	27–30 Apr 2015	?	?	36.1; 24	18.5; 12	4.3; 0	1.9; 0	15.5; 10			17.3; 11	17.6
Metroscopia/El País	27–28 Apr 2015	600	69	34.6; 22	17.2; 10	4.2; 0	0.6; 0	16.9; 10			24.3; 15	10.3
Cámara de Comercio	23 Apr 2015	?	?	35.3; 21	18.5; 11	6.7; 4	1.4; 0	11.8; 7			23.6; 14	11.7
Deimos Estadística	16–23 Apr 2015	605	77.1	37.6; 24/25	26.1; 16	4.3; 0	2.3; 0	14.8; 8/9			12.3; 8/9	11.5
GAD3/ABC	13–20 Apr 2015	608	?	34.5; 21/23	21.2; 13/14	4.6; 0/3	1.1; 0	15.6; 9/10			18.2; 11/12	13.3
Encuestamos	2–20 Apr 2015	600	?	32.9; 19/22	22.1; 13/15	4.7; 0/3	0.8; 0	14.8; 8/9			21.8; 12/14	10.8
CIS	23 Mar–19 Apr 2015	927	?	34.5; 22/23	18.8; 12	4.2; 0	3.2; 0	14.9; 9/10			20.8; 13/14	13.7
Sigma Dos/Mediaset	14–16 Apr 2015	?	?	36.8; 23/24	17.5; 10/11	4.9; 0/3	1.4; 0	16.8; 10			18.6; 11/12	18.2
PP	3 Apr 2015	?	?	34.0– 36.0	18.0– 19.0	5.0– 6.0	2.0– 3.0	14.0– 16.0			21.0– 22.0	13.0– 14.0
Sigma Dos/El Mundo	25–26 Mar 2015	800	?	34.5; 20/22	18.7; 11	6.4; 3/4	1.4; 0	15.1; 9			21.2; 12/13	13.3
Metroscopia/El País	19–20 Feb 2015	?	?	31.0; 20	22.5; 14	4.5; 0	2.1; 0	14.2; 9	(Note: Within Ganemos.)	21.9; 14	–	8.5
PP	18 Feb 2015	?	? (Note: Esperanza Aguirre as PP candidate hypothesis.)	? 30	? 8	? 3	? 3	? 4		? 9	–	?
PP	18 Feb 2015	?	? (Note: No specified PP candidate.)	? 26	? 9	? 3	? 4	? 6		? 9	–	?
InvyMark/laSexta	12–13 Feb 2015	?	?	40.1; 26	21.5; 14	5.0; 3	4.8; 0	6.5; 4		14.9; 10	–	18.6
Metroscopia/El País	11 Feb 2015	?	?	29.5; 19	24.7; 16	3.8; 0	4.1; 0	11.7; 7		22.6; 15	–	4.8
PP	4 Feb 2015	?	?	? 23	? 17	–	–	? 4		? 13	–	?
Metroscopia/El País	26 Jan 2015	?	?	28.7; 18	22.0; 14	8.3; 5	7.2; 4	8.5; 5		18.6; 11	–	6.7
Sigma Dos/El Mundo	1–14 Nov 2014	800	?	31.4; 20/21	19.5; 12/13	6.8; 4	7.7; 4/5	4.3; 0	24.6; 15/16	–	–	6.8
Llorente & Cuenca	31 Oct 2014	?	?	? 21/24	? 11/13	? 5/7	? 5/7	–	? 11/13	–	–	?
GAD3/ABC	5–11 Sep 2014	600	71	42.1; 26	14.4; 9	7.7; 4	10.4; 6	5.3; 3	15.1; 9	–	–	27.0
2014 EP election	25 May 2014	—N/a	50.0	32.4 (23)	18.2 (13)	10.3 (7)	9.6 (7)	4.7 (0)	10.5 (7)	–	–	14.2
Metroscopia/El País	24–28 Apr 2014	600	60	32.5; 21	23.4; 15	20.8; 14	11.6; 7	–	–	–	–	9.1
InvyMark/laSexta	21 Apr 2014	?	?	39.4; 25	23.5; 14	14.8; 9	15.6; 9	–	–	–	–	15.9
Metroscopia/El País	13 May 2013	600	55.2	30.2; 21	22.1; 15	20.5; 14	11.2; 7	–	–	–	–	8.1
GAD3/ABC	9–13 Jan 2012	400	?	51.2; 32/33	22.8; 14/15	8.1; 4/5	9.2; 5/6	–	–	–	–	28.4
2011 general election	20 Nov 2011	—N/a	75.2	51.6 (32)	25.7 (15)	7.9 (4)	9.8 (6)	–	–	–	–	25.9
2011 municipal election	22 May 2011	—N/a	67.2	49.7; 31	23.9; 15	10.7; 6	7.9; 5	0.2; 0	–	–	–	25.8

=== Voting preferences ===
The table below lists raw, unweighted voting preferences.

Polling firm/Commissioner	Fieldwork date	Sample size	PP	PSOE	IUCM–LV	UPyD	C's	Podemos	Ganemos	Ahora Madrid	Question	X mark	Lead
2015 municipal election	24 May 2015	—N/a	23.6	10.4	1.2	1.2	7.8			21.8	—N/a	31.1	1.8
Metroscopia/El País	13–14 May 2015	1,000	20.4	11.7	3.3	0.6	11.1			19.1	27.3	3.9	1.3
MyWord/Cadena SER	29 Apr–6 May 2015	801	14.7	7.5	2.6	1.4	13.4			17.6	30.1	7.0	2.9
Metroscopia/El País	27–28 Apr 2015	600	23.0	12.2	3.0	0.3	12.0			17.2	25.8	4.8	5.8
CIS	23 Mar–19 Apr 2015	927	20.1	12.7	2.7	1.2	10.6			16.9	24.4	9.0	3.2
2014 EP election (Note: Does not include non-resident citizens.)	25 May 2014	—N/a	16.0	9.0	5.1	4.8	2.3	5.2	–	–	—N/a	50.0	7.0
2011 general election	20 Nov 2011	—N/a	38.5	19.2	5.9	7.3	–	–	–	–	—N/a	24.8	19.3
2011 municipal election	22 May 2011	—N/a	32.8	15.8	7.1	5.2	0.1	–	–	–	—N/a	32.8	17.0

=== Victory preferences ===
The table below lists opinion polling on the victory preferences for each party in the event of a municipal election taking place.

Polling firm/Commissioner	Fieldwork date	Sample size	PP	PSOE	Other/ None	Question	Lead
Metroscopia/El País	24–28 Apr 2014	600	23.0	19.0	58.0		4.0

=== Victory likelihood ===
The table below lists opinion polling on the perceived likelihood of victory for each party in the event of a municipal election taking place.

Polling firm/Commissioner	Fieldwork date	Sample size	PP	PSOE	UPyD	Other/ None	Question	Lead
Metroscopia/El País	24–28 Apr 2014	600	62.0	14.0	1.0	23.0		48.0

== Results ==
← Summary of the 24 May 2015 City Council of Madrid election results →
Parties and alliances	Popular vote			Seats	
Parties and alliances	Votes	%	±pp	Total	+/−
People's Party (PP)	564,154	34.57	−15.12	21	−10
Madrid Now (Ahora Madrid)	519,721	31.84	New	20	+20
Spanish Socialist Workers' Party (PSOE)	249,286	15.27	−8.66	9	−6
Citizens–Party of the Citizenry (C's)	186,487	11.43	+11.24	7	+7
Union, Progress and Democracy (UPyD)	29,812	1.83	−6.02	0	−5
United Left of the Community of Madrid–The Greens (IUCM–LV)	27,651	1.69	−9.06	0	−6
Vox (Vox)	9,867	0.60	New	0	±0
Animalist Party Against Mistreatment of Animals (PACMA)	9,599	0.59	+0.13	0	±0
The Greens–Green Group (LV–GV)	5,409	0.33	New	0	±0
United Free Citizens (CILUS)	2,512	0.15	New	0	±0
Spanish Phalanx of the CNSO (FE de las JONS)	2,089	0.13	±0.00	0	±0
Blank Seats (EB)	1,895	0.12	New	0	±0
The National Coalition (LCN)	1,259	0.08	New	0	±0
Communist Party of the Peoples of Spain (PCPE)	1,226	0.08	−0.06	0	±0
Humanist Party (PH)	1,015	0.06	−0.07	0	±0
Spanish Alternative (AES)	998	0.06	−0.25	0	±0
Multi-Cultural Party of Social Justice (MJS)	789	0.05	New	0	±0
Libertarian Party (P–LIB)	617	0.04	New	0	±0
Internationalist Solidarity and Self-Management (SAIn)	543	0.03	New	0	±0
Internationalist Socialist Workers' Party (POSI)	528	0.03	−0.04	0	±0
Castilian Party–Commoners' Land: Pact (PCAS–TC: Pacto)	490	0.03	−0.03	0	±0
Union for Leganés (ULEG)	270	0.02	−0.05	0	±0
Blank ballots	15,825	0.97	−1.87		
Total	1,632,042			57	±0
Valid votes	1,632,042	99.27	+1.09		
Invalid votes	12,051	0.73	−1.09		
Votes cast / turnout	1,644,093	68.90	+1.68		
Abstentions	742,027	31.10	−1.68		
Registered voters	2,386,120				

Popular vote
PP	34.57%
Ahora Madrid	31.84%
PSOE	15.27%
C's	11.43%
UPyD	1.83%
IUCM–LV	1.69%
Others	2.40%
Blank ballots	0.97%

Seats
PP	36.84%
Ahora Madrid	35.09%
PSOE	15.79%
C's	12.28%

== Aftermath ==
=== Government formation ===
Investiture
Ballot →	13 June 2015	
Required majority →	29 out of 57	
Manuela Carmena (AM): • Ahora Madrid (20); • PSOE (9)	29 / 57	check
Esperanza Aguirre (PP): • PP (21)	21 / 57	X mark
Begoña Villacís (C's): • C's (7)	7 / 57	X mark
Abstentions/Blank ballots	0 / 57	
Absentees	0 / 57	

== Bibliography ==
- Constitución Española (Constitution). Official State Gazette (in Spanish). 27 December 1978 [version as of 27 September 2011]. BOE-A-1978-31229.
- Ley 7/1985, de 2 de abril, Reguladora de las Bases del Régimen Local (Law 7/1985). Official State Gazette (in Spanish). 2 April 1985 [version as of 30 December 2013]. BOE-A-1985-5392.
- Ley Orgánica 5/1985, de 19 de junio, del Régimen Electoral General (Organic Law 5/1985). Official State Gazette (in Spanish). 19 June 1985 [version as of 31 March 2015]. BOE-A-1985-11672.
- Real Decreto 233/2015, de 30 de marzo, por el que se convocan elecciones locales y a las Asambleas de Ceuta y Melilla para el 24 de mayo de 2015 (Royal Decree 233/2015). Official State Gazette (in Spanish). 30 March 2015. BOE-A-2015-3448.
