= Ahora Madrid =

Madrid Now Ahora Madrid
- Leader: Manuela Carmena
- Founded: 6 March 2015
- Dissolved: 26 May 2019
- Merger of: Podemos; CpM; PCE-PCM; Equo; PUM+J
- Succeeded by: Más Madrid
- Headquarters: C/ Montera, 32; 28013, Madrid
- Ideology: Progressivism; Left-wing populism Participatory democracy
- Political position: Left-wing
- Colours: Persian green

Website
- ahoramadrid.org

Ahora Madrid (English: Madrid Now) was a citizen platform of popular unity, formed as an instrumental party without organic internal life, in order to stand for the municipal elections of 2015 in the city of Madrid.

For this project, Ganemos Madrid, a citizen platform inspired by Guanyem Barcelona (now called Barcelona en Comú) and the parties Equo, Podemos and PUM+J joined forces.

== History ==
On 28 June 2014 "Municipalia", later renamed Ganemos Madrid, appeared. The goal of this platform was to gain Madrid as a citizens' horizontal initiative formed by a confluence of people, groups, parties and social movements. On 29 January 2014, Ganemos Madrid confirmed that their goal was the confluence of different left-wing forces to stand for the municipal elections as an instrumental party.

On 6 March Ahora Madrid was presented as the instrumental party formed by this confluence of citizens, associations, movements and parties. Although the most members of United Left Madrid (IUCM) supported participating in Ahora Madrid, after an internal crisis, the majority sector, including the Communist Party of Madrid and a group of independents that later founded Convocatoria por Madrid, decided to abandon IUCM and join Ahora Madrid. IUCM finally decided not to participate in Ahora Madrid or similar lists.

On 30 March the results of the primaries, in which over 15 000 people participated through online voting, were made public. Manuela Carmena was elected by a large majority as candidate for mayor, Nacho Murgui (ex-president of the Regional Federation of Neighbourhood Associations of Madrid) ranks second in the list, Inés Sabanés (Equo) 3rd, Mauricio Valiente (exIUCM, Communist Party of Madrid) 4th, Rita Maestre (Podemos and Youth Without a Future.) 5th, Pablo Carmona (Ganemos Madrid) 6th, Marta Higueras 7th, Pablo Soto 8th, Celia Mayer (Ganemos Madrid and member of the Patio Maravillas) 9th and Jorge García (exIU, Convocatoria por Madrid) 10th.

In the 2015 Madrid municipal election, it gained 20 seats and was the second most voted party behind People's Party, which gained 21 seats.

The 20 city councillors were elected in the following order: Manuela Carmena, Nacho Murgui, Inés Sabanés, Mauricio Valiente, Rita Maestre, Pablo Carmona, Marta Higueras, Pablo Soto, Celia Mayer, Jorge García Castaño, Marta Gómez Lahoz, Guillermo Zapata, Rommy Arce, Carlos Sánchez Mato, Montserrat Galcerán, Francisco Pérez Ramos, Esther Gómez, Javier Barbero, Yolanda Rodríguez and José Manuel Calvo.

The elaboration of the program was open to all citizens and a lot of the suggestions were included in the final version of the program.

The primaries also covered a vote to choose which of the measures from the program of Ahora Madrid should take priority and "should be introduced within the first 100 days of municipal administration".

== Electoral performance ==
City Council of Madrid
| Election | Vote | % | Score | Seats | +/– | Leader | Status |
| 2015 | 519,721 | 31.84 | 2nd | 20 / 57 | ▲20 | Manuela Carmena | Government |

== Ideology ==
According to AFP, "Ideologically, Ahora Madrid has its roots in anarchist and libertarian movements."
