= Opinion polling for the 2023 Spanish local elections (Community of Madrid) =

In the run up to the 2023 Spanish local elections, various organisations carried out opinion polling to gauge voting intention in local entities in Spain. Results of such polls for municipalities in the Community of Madrid are displayed in this article. The date range for these opinion polls is from the previous local elections, held on 26 May 2019, to the day the next elections were held, on 28 May 2023.

Polls are listed in reverse chronological order, showing the most recent first and using the dates when the survey fieldwork was done, as opposed to the date of publication. Where the fieldwork dates are unknown, the date of publication is given instead. The highest percentage figure in each polling survey is displayed with its background shaded in the leading party's colour. If a tie ensues, this is applied to the figures with the highest percentages. The "Lead" columns on the right shows the percentage-point difference between the parties with the highest percentages in a given poll.

== Municipalities ==
=== Alcalá de Henares ===
Polling firm/Commissioner	Fieldwork date	Sample size	Turnout	PSOE	CS	PP	Vox	Podemos–IU	Somos Alcalá	E-2000	Más Madrid	Podemos	IU–Madrid	Lead
2023 municipal election	28 May 2023	—N/a	67.7	37.2; 11	2.5; 0	35.5; 11	11.6; 3	–	–	–	6.5; 2	2.3; 0	2.8; 0	1.7
EM-Analytics/Alcalá Hoy	15–22 Apr 2023	500	?	37.0; 12	2.8; 0	32.8; 10	11.3; 3	–	–	–	6.1; 1	5.1; 1	2.5; 0	4.2
GAD3/PP	14–15 Feb 2023	600	?	39.5; 12	2.9; 0	35.1; 11	7.7; 2	6.0; 1	–	–	5.7; 1	(Note: Within Unidas Podemos.)		4.4
GAD3/PP	Oct 2022	?	?	41.7; 13	2.8; 0	30.5; 9	11.9; 3/4	7.1; 1/2	–	–	1.6; 0			11.2
EM-Analytics/Electomanía	7 Apr 2021	680	?	36.1; 11	6.7; 2	30.2; 9	11.8; 3	6.9; 2	1.4; 0	2.3; 0	3.5; 0			5.9
ElectoPanel/Electomanía	1 Apr–15 Jun 2020	?	?	33.7; 10	11.2; 3	21.5; 6	15.4; 5	11.2; 3	–	–	–			12.2
2019 municipal election	26 May 2019	—N/a	64.6	37.0; 12	19.2; 6	17.0; 5	8.0; 2	7.5; 2	4.4; 0	3.2; 0	2.3; 0			17.8

=== Alcobendas ===
Polling firm/Commissioner	Fieldwork date	Sample size	Turnout	PP	PSOE	FCS	Vox	Podemos	MMAlcobendas	IU–MeP	Podemos–IU–AV	Lead
2023 municipal election	28 May 2023	—N/a	69.9	42.6; 13	29.3; 9	5.1; 1	11.1; 3		5.8; 1		3.3; 0	13.3
La Tribuna de La Moraleja	22 May 2023	1,009	?	31.4; 9	27.6; 8	15.9; 5	10.2; 3	3.9; 0	6.4; 2	–	–	3.8
GAD3/PP	12–16 Jan 2023	521	?	41.5; 12	32.0; 10	7.6; 2	8.2; 2	5.0; 1	2.7; 0	–	–	9.5
Celeste-Tel	10–28 Oct 2022	700	66.6	34.7; 11	35.4; 11	8.8; 2	9.1; 2	5.1; 1	3.2; 0	2.7; 0	–	0.7
La Tribuna de La Moraleja	13–17 Jun 2022	350	?	42.9; 13	27.1; 8	3.1; 0	11.9; 3	5.1; 1	6.6; 2	1.4; 0	–	15.8
GAD3/PP	Jan 2022	?	?	40.2; 12	29.4; 9	7.3; 2	10.9; 3	5.7; 1	3.0; 0	–	–	10.8
EM-Analytics/Electomanía	28 Apr 2021	850	?	40.7; 13	30.3; 9	4.9; 0	9.2; 3	6.1; 1	6.0; 1	1.3; 0	–	10.4
2019 municipal election	26 May 2019	—N/a	67.4	34.3; 10	30.5; 9	15.7 (Note: Results for Cs.); 5	6.8; 2	5.7; 1	3.0; 0	2.4; 0	–	3.8

=== Alcorcón ===
Polling firm/Commissioner	Fieldwork date	Sample size	Turnout	PSOE	PP	CS	Ganar Alcorcón	Vox	MM–Alcorcón	Lead
2023 municipal election	28 May 2023	—N/a	70.9	25.9; 8	38.8; 11	1.4; 0	15.7; 4	9.2; 2	7.3; 2	12.9
Sigma Dos/Al Cabo de la Calle	12–18 Apr 2023	655	?	31.2; 9	32.9; 10	–	19.3; 5/6	8.7; 2/3	4.2; 0	1.7
EM-Analytics/Electomanía	15 Nov–28 Jan 2023	411	?	33.5; 10	27.6; 8	3.1; 0	15.4; 5	10.8; 3	5.2; 1	5.9
GAD3/PP	17–18 Jan 2023	801	?	28.1; 8	36.9; 11	2.2; 0	16.5; 5	9.2; 2	5.0; 1	8.8
GAD3/PSOE	1–5 Oct 2021	806	?	34.8; 10/11	27.9; 8/9	4.6; 0/1	16.3; 5	9.7; 2/3	4.1; 0	6.9
EM-Analytics/Electomanía	17 Apr 2021	625	?	32.1; 9	27.4; 8	5.5; 1	16.4; 5	10.1; 3	6.0; 1	4.7
2019 municipal election	26 May 2019	—N/a	68.8	29.2; 9	19.9; 6	19.1; 5	17.7; 5	6.9; 2	4.7; 0	9.3

=== Arganda del Rey ===
Polling firm/Commissioner	Fieldwork date	Sample size	Turnout	PSOE	PP	CS	Vox	Podemos–IU–Equo	MMArganda	Clotilde Cuéllar	Lead
2023 municipal election	28 May 2023	—N/a	65.5	38.9; 11	39.9; 11	2.0; 0	10.1; 3	3.4; 0	4.6; 0	–	1.0
GAD3/PP	13–14 Oct 2022	500	?	38.8; 11/12	32.9; 9/10	2.6; 0	13.7; 4	4.3; 0	4.2; 0	–	5.9
GAD3/PP	Jul 2022	?	?	38.9; 12	30.3; 9	2.6; 0	15.9; 4	4.5; 0	4.5; 0	–	8.6
CNS	26 Jan–7 Feb 2022	293	60.5	46.1; 13/14	22.8; 6	6.9; 1	11.6; 3	3.5; 0/1	1.7; 0	5.8; 1	23.3
2019 municipal election	26 May 2019	—N/a	68.8	45.5; 13	21.1; 6	11.1; 3	8.5; 2	6.8; 1	3.3; 0		24.4

=== Fuenlabrada ===
Polling firm/Commissioner	Fieldwork date	Sample size	Turnout	PSOE	CS	PP	Vox	Podemos–IU	MM–Fuenlabrada	Lead
2023 municipal election	28 May 2023	—N/a	68.4	54.3; 16	0.9; 0	24.4; 7	11.1; 3	3.0; 0	5.4; 1	29.9
EM-Analytics/Electomanía	31 Mar 2021	790	?	53.9; 16	2.8; 0	19.8; 6	10.3; 3	8.5; 2	2.6; 0	34.1
2019 municipal election	26 May 2019	—N/a	62.0	55.5; 16	13.3; 4	10.9; 3	7.2; 2	6.5; 2	3.7; 0	42.2

=== Ciempozuelos ===
Polling firm/Commissioner	Fieldwork date	Sample size	Turnout	PSOE	AHC	PP	CPCI	Cs	Vox	Más Madrid	IU–Madrid	PDC	Lead
2023 municipal election	28 May 2023	—N/a	59.9	43.0; 11	–	26.8; 6	6.3; 1	–	9.7; 2	5.4; 1	4.9; 0	2.9; 0	16.2
ZigZag Digital	31 Mar–13 Apr 2023	466	?	35.1; 8/9	–	24.2; 5/6	12.5; 2/3	1.6; 0	6.8; 1/2	10.9; 2/3	5.1; 0/1	3.8; 0/1	10.9
2019 municipal election	26 May 2019	—N/a	58.2	26.6; 6	17.9; 4	17.1; 4	16.0; 3	12.3; 2	9.1; 2	–	(Note: Within AHC.)	–	8.7

=== Getafe ===
Polling firm/Commissioner	Fieldwork date	Sample size	Turnout	PSOE	PP	CS	Podemos	Vox	MMCCG	IGE	Podemos–IU–AV	Lead
2023 municipal election	28 May 2023	—N/a	70.3	36.3; 10	33.6; 10	1.9; 0		7.9; 2	10.8; 3	–	8.3; 2	2.7
GAD3/PSOE	5–6 Oct 2022	800	?	38.3; 12	26.8; 8	1.9; 0	9.9; 2/3	9.1; 2/3	8.9; 2	–	–	11.5
GAD3/PSOE	11–13 Jan 2022	802	?	37.8; 11/12	25.6; 7/8	3.3; 0	9.5; 3	8.9; 2/3	9.1; 2/3	–	–	12.2
EM-Analytics/Electomanía	14 Apr 2021	691	?	35.8; 11	25.9; 7	3.7; 0	15.0; 4	9.9; 3	6.6; 2	0.2; 0	–	9.9
2019 municipal election	26 May 2019	—N/a	68.3	35.2; 11	16.1; 5	15.7; 5	12.6; 3	6.5; 2	5.5; 1	3.9; 0	–	19.1

=== Humanes de Madrid ===
Polling firm/Commissioner	Fieldwork date	Sample size	Turnout	PP	PSOE	CS	Podemos	Vox	IU–Madrid	Podemos–IU	VpH	Lead
2023 municipal election	28 May 2023	—N/a	66.9	41.1; 7	21.2; 4	–		10.5; 2		6.3; 1	19.6; 3	19.9
Sigma Dos/Al Cabo de la Calle	3–12 May 2023	300	?	43.9; 8	24.1; 4	–		11.5; 2		6.9; 1	11.8; 2	19.8
Sigma Dos/Al Cabo de la Calle	15–20 Apr 2023	400	?	39.5; 8	22.2; 4	–		9.4; 1/2		12.0; 1/2	13.6; 2	17.3
2019 municipal election	26 May 2019	—N/a	63.5	38.0; 8	26.3; 5	11.8; 2	6.8; 1	5.7; 1	4.4; 0	–	–	11.7

=== Leganés ===
Polling firm/Commissioner	Fieldwork date	Sample size	Turnout	PSOE	ULEG	PP	Podemos–IU	CS	L	Vox	MM	Lead
2023 municipal election	28 May 2023	—N/a	69.4	27.4; 8	11.5; 3	31.7; 9	6.6; 2	1.2; 0	1.6; 0	7.9; 2	10.6; 3	4.3
GAD3/Leganés Actualidad	25–26 Apr 2023	803	?	28.5; 8/9	10.3; 3	31.1; 9	8.2; 2	1.2; 0	2.2; 0	10.5; 3	6.2; 1/2	2.6
GAD3/Leganés Actualidad	3–4 Oct 2022	704	?	28.9; 8/9	14.0; 4	29.1; 9	8.0; 2	2.6; 0	8.9; 2	6.8; 1/2	(Note: Within Leganemos.)	0.2
EM-Analytics/Electomanía	10 Apr 2021	620	?	28.2; 9	18.7; 5	21.3; 6	11.3; 3	7.4; 2	5.4; 1	6.1; 1		6.9
2019 municipal election	26 May 2019	—N/a	66.4	32.3; 10	15.6; 4	15.4; 4	11.1; 3	10.4; 3	7.3; 2	6.1; 1		16.7

=== Moraleja de Enmedio ===
Polling firm/Commissioner	Fieldwork date	Sample size	Turnout	PSOE	PP	CS	Vox	Podemos	Podemos–IU–AV	Lead
2023 municipal election	28 May 2023	—N/a	72.2	41.7; 6	37.3; 5	4.4; 0	13.5; 2		1.8; 0	4.4
Sigma Dos/Al Cabo de la Calle	3–12 May 2023	301	?	50.1; 7/8	31.2; 4/5	–	12.8; 1/2		–	18.9
2019 municipal election	26 May 2019	—N/a	70.1	48.2; 7	24.8; 3	14.6; 2	7.2; 1	4.0; 0	–	23.4

=== Móstoles ===
Polling firm/Commissioner	Fieldwork date	Sample size	Turnout	PSOE	PP	CS	MMGM	Vox	Podemos	Podemos–IU–AV	Lead
2023 municipal election	28 May 2023	—N/a	66.6	22.3; 7	37.4; 12	1.5; 0	15.6; 4	10.5; 3		5.3; 1	15.1
GAD3/PP	7–11 Oct 2022	600	?	30.0; 9	37.6; 11	2.3; 0	10.3; 3	10.1; 2/3	5.9; 1/2	–	7.6
EM-Analytics/Electomanía	24 Mar 2021	800	?	32.4; 10	34.8; 11	1.7; 0	5.5; 1	9.4; 2	11.5; 3	–	2.4
ElectoPanel/Electomanía	1 Apr–15 Jun 2020	?	?	36.1; 11	28.2; 8	8.4; 2	6.7; 2	13.2; 4	3.4; 0	–	7.9
2019 municipal election	26 May 2019	—N/a	62.3	33.6; 10	20.8; 6	17.0; 5	8.4; 2	7.6; 2	7.4; 2	–	12.8

=== Parla ===
Polling firm/Commissioner	Fieldwork date	Sample size	Turnout	PSOE	PP	Podemos–IU	CS	Vox	MOVER Parla	MMP	Lead
2023 municipal election	28 May 2023	—N/a	61.6	37.9; 11	30.6; 9	7.0; 2	1.8; 0	12.0; 3	–	7.5; 2	7.3
Simple Lógica/Cadena SER	21 Mar–5 Apr 2023	802	?	42.0; 12/13	26.5; 8/9	8.6; 2/3	1.2; 0	14.5; 4/5	–	2.1; 0	15.5
EM-Analytics/Electomanía	24 Apr 2021	815	?	30.6; 10	24.5; 7	13.2; 4	9.2; 2	11.2; 3	3.6; 0	5.8; 1	6.1
2019 municipal election	26 May 2019	—N/a	57.9	28.9; 9	18.8; 5	14.8; 4	13.2; 4	10.5; 3	6.6; 2	4.9; 0	10.1

=== Pinto ===
Polling firm/Commissioner	Fieldwork date	Sample size	Turnout	PSOE	PP	GP	CS	Podemos	Vox	SP	MMP	PA	Lead
2023 municipal election	28 May 2023	—N/a	70.1	31.2; 8	32.0; 9	7.0; 2	1.2; 0	(Note: Within Unidas Pinto.)	8.3; 2	–	9.6; 2	9.5; 2	0.8
Sigma Dos/Al Cabo de la Calle	14–20 Apr 2023	502	?	31.5; 8/9	31.4; 8/9	11.0; 3	1.0; 0		10.6; 3	–	4.8; 0/1	8.7; 2	0.1
40dB/Unidas Pinto	19–31 Jan 2023	404	?	20.4; 6	29.9; 9	30.8; 9	4.5; 0		6.2; 1	2.1; 0		–	0.9
40dB/Unidas Pinto	19–31 Jan 2023	404	?	27.7; 8	29.2; 8	13.5; 4	4.6; 0		7.0; 2	2.1; 0	10.4; 3	–	1.5
2019 municipal election	26 May 2019	—N/a	68.3	32.7; 9	24.4; 7	13.9; 4	12.4; 3	5.4; 1	5.2; 1	4.1; 0	–	–	8.3

=== Rivas-Vaciamadrid ===
Polling firm/Commissioner	Fieldwork date	Sample size	Turnout	IU	PSOE	CS	PP	Podemos	Vox	Más Madrid	Lead
2023 municipal election	28 May 2023	—N/a	75.7	30.0; 9	17.3; 5	1.6; 0	31.6; 9	4.1; 0	8.6; 2	(Note: Within IU.)	1.6
Metroscopia	Mar 2023	?	69	28.0; 8	21.5; 6	1.5; 0	25.1; 7	6.5; 1/2	7.4; 2	4.8; 0/1	2.9
Metroscopia	25–28 Oct 2022	600	?	27.5; 7/8	21.2; 6	–	24.4; 6/7	7.8; 2	8.6; 2	5.0; 1	3.1
Metroscopia	25–26 Apr 2022	600	?	25.2; 7	22.3; 6	2.3; 0	23.0; 6	7.2; 2	10.1; 3	5.5; 1	2.2
2019 municipal election	26 May 2019	—N/a	71.7	26.2; 7	23.2; 7	17.4; 5	9.1; 2	8.5; 2	6.9; 2		3.0

=== San Sebastián de los Reyes ===
Polling firm/Commissioner	Fieldwork date	Sample size	Turnout	PSOE	PP	VxSS	II	Vox	MM	Podemos	Podemos–IU–AV	Lead
2023 municipal election	28 May 2023	—N/a	71.2	20.3; 6	40.1; 11	5.5; 1	12.2; 3	10.1; 3	5.9; 1		4.4; 0	19.8
GAD3/PP	16–20 Feb 2023	501	?	27.1; 8	36.2; 11	5.4; 1	9.8; 2	9.2; 2	5.1; 1	3.9; 0	–	9.1
GAD3/PP	17–18 Oct 2022	500	?	27.6; 8	34.4; 10	5.2; 0/1	8.0; 2	11.8; 3	6.1; 1/2	4.0; 0	–	6.8
2019 municipal election	26 May 2019	—N/a	66.5	25.7; 7	23.8; 7	18.5; 5	10.0; 2	7.4; 2	5.3; 1	5.0; 1	–	1.9

=== Torrejón de Ardoz ===
Polling firm/Commissioner	Fieldwork date	Sample size	Turnout	PP	PSOE	Podemos	CS	IU–MeP	Más Madrid–VpT	Vox	Podemos–IU–AV	Lead
2023 municipal election	28 May 2023	—N/a	65.3	66.3; 21	16.6; 5		0.4; 0		6.2; 1	3.3; 0	4.5; 0	49.7
EM-Analytics/Electomanía	20 Apr 2021	590	?	54.5; 17	22.3; 7	5.8; 1	2.0; 0	1.5; 0	3.9; 0	8.6; 2	–	32.2
2019 municipal election	26 May 2019	—N/a	67.4	57.5; 19	20.3; 6	6.7; 2	4.6; 0	4.2; 0	2.7; 0	2.4; 0	–	37.2

=== Valdemoro ===
Polling firm/Commissioner	Fieldwork date	Sample size	Turnout	PSOE	CS	Vox	PP	Más Madrid	Podemos	VxV	Lead
2023 municipal election	28 May 2023	—N/a	67.6	25.3; 7	2.4; 0	16.3; 4	35.9; 11	9.5; 2	2.4; 0	5.2; 1	10.6
Sigma Dos/Al Cabo de la Calle	19–21 Apr 2023	502	?	27.7; 7/8	–	20.2; 5/6	31.7; 9	7.4; 2	4.9; 0/1	–	4.0
ZigZag Digital	3–17 Mar 2023	489	?	24.5; 7/8	7.5; 1/2	15.0; 4/5	30.5; 8/9	14.5; 4/5	4.5; 0/1	–	6.0
2019 municipal election	26 May 2019	—N/a	64.8	28.6; 9	24.2; 7	16.2; 5	11.6; 3	5.2; 1	4.5; 0	–	4.4
