= 2023 Spanish local elections in the Community of Madrid =

This article presents the results breakdown of the local elections held in the Community of Madrid on 28 May 2023. The following tables show detailed results in the autonomous community's most populous municipalities, sorted alphabetically.

== City control ==
The following table lists party control in the most populous municipalities, including provincial capitals (shown in bold). Gains for a party are displayed with the cell's background shaded in that party's colour.

| Municipality | Population | Previous control | New control |
|---|---|---|---|
| Alcalá de Henares | 196,888 | Spanish Socialist Workers' Party (PSOE) | People's Party (PP) |
| Alcobendas | 117,041 | Spanish Socialist Workers' Party (PSOE) | People's Party (PP) |
| Alcorcón | 170,296 | Spanish Socialist Workers' Party (PSOE) | Spanish Socialist Workers' Party (PSOE) |
| Coslada | 80,596 | Spanish Socialist Workers' Party (PSOE) | Spanish Socialist Workers' Party (PSOE) |
| Fuenlabrada | 189,891 | Spanish Socialist Workers' Party (PSOE) | Spanish Socialist Workers' Party (PSOE) |
| Getafe | 183,219 | Spanish Socialist Workers' Party (PSOE) | Spanish Socialist Workers' Party (PSOE) |
| Las Rozas de Madrid | 95,725 | People's Party (PP) | People's Party (PP) |
| Leganés | 186,660 | Spanish Socialist Workers' Party (PSOE) | People's Party (PP) |
| **Madrid** | 3,280,782 | People's Party (PP) | People's Party (PP) |
| Móstoles | 208,761 | Spanish Socialist Workers' Party (PSOE) | People's Party (PP) |
| Parla | 130,577 | Spanish Socialist Workers' Party (PSOE) | Spanish Socialist Workers' Party (PSOE) |
| Pozuelo de Alarcón | 87,728 | People's Party (PP) | People's Party (PP) |
| Rivas-Vaciamadrid | 96,690 | United Left (IU) | United Left (IU) |
| San Sebastián de los Reyes | 91,083 | Spanish Socialist Workers' Party (PSOE) | People's Party (PP) |
| Torrejón de Ardoz | 134,733 | People's Party (PP) | People's Party (PP) |

== Municipalities ==
=== Alcalá de Henares ===
Population: 196,888

← Summary of the 28 May 2023 City Council of Alcalá de Henares election results →
| Parties and alliances | Popular vote | | | Seats | |
| Parties and alliances | Votes | % | ±pp | Total | +/− |
|---|---|---|---|---|---|
| Spanish Socialist Workers' Party (PSOE) | 35,014 | 37.17 | +0.12 | 11 | −1 |
| People's Party (PP) | 33,485 | 35.55 | +18.53 | 11 | +6 |
| Vox (Vox) | 10,929 | 11.60 | +3.63 | 3 | +1 |
| More Madrid–Greens Equo Alcalá de Henares (MM–VQ Alcalá de Henares) | 6,086 | 6.46 | +4.12 | 2 | +2 |
| United Left (IU)^{1} | 2,674 | 2.84 | n/a | 0 | −1 |
| Citizens–Party of the Citizenry (CS) | 2,328 | 2.47 | −16.73 | 0 | −6 |
| We Can–Green Alliance (Podemos–AV)^{1} | 2,171 | 2.30 | n/a | 0 | −1 |
| Humanist Party (PH) | 279 | 0.30 | +0.09 | 0 | ±0 |
| Spanish Phalanx of the CNSO (FE de las JONS) | 146 | 0.15 | New | 0 | ±0 |
| Blank ballots | 1,085 | 1.15 | +0.50 | | |
| Total | 94,197 | | | 27 | ±0 |
| Valid votes | 94,197 | 98.92 | −0.55 | | |
| Invalid votes | 1,026 | 1.08 | +0.55 | | |
| Votes cast / turnout | 95,223 | 67.66 | +3.03 | | |
| Abstentions | 45,522 | 32.34 | −3.03 | | |
| Registered voters | 140,745 | | | | |
Sources
Footnotes: ^{1} Within the United We Can–United Left alliance in the 2015 election.

=== Alcobendas ===
Population: 117,041

← Summary of the 28 May 2023 City Council of Alcobendas election results →
| Parties and alliances | Popular vote | | | Seats | |
| Parties and alliances | Votes | % | ±pp | Total | +/− |
|---|---|---|---|---|---|
| People's Party (PP) | 24,271 | 42.56 | +8.23 | 13 | +3 |
| Spanish Socialist Workers' Party (PSOE) | 16,713 | 29.31 | −1.14 | 9 | ±0 |
| Vox (Vox) | 6,354 | 11.14 | +4.30 | 3 | +1 |
| More Madrid–Greens Equo Alcobendas (MM–VQ Alcobendas) | 3,280 | 5.75 | +2.72 | 1 | +1 |
| Future Alcobendas–Citizens (F–CS)^{1} | 2,889 | 5.07 | −10.68 | 1 | −4 |
| We Can–United Left–Green Alliance (Podemos–IU–AV)^{2} | 1,904 | 3.34 | −4.75 | 0 | −1 |
| For Alcobendas (X Alcobendas) | 862 | 1.51 | New | 0 | ±0 |
| Humanist Party (PH) | 133 | 0.23 | +0.06 | 0 | ±0 |
| Blank ballots | 620 | 1.09 | +0.44 | | |
| Total | 57,026 | | | 27 | ±0 |
| Valid votes | 57,026 | 99.06 | −0.41 | | |
| Invalid votes | 539 | 0.94 | +0.41 | | |
| Votes cast / turnout | 57,565 | 69.93 | +5.30 | | |
| Abstentions | 24,757 | 30.07 | −5.30 | | |
| Registered voters | 82,322 | | | | |
Sources
Footnotes: ^{1} Future Alcobendas–Citizens results are compared to Citizens–Party of the Citizenry totals in the 2019 election.; ^{2} We Can–United Left–Green Alliance results are compared to the combined totals of We Can and United Left–Stand Up Madrid in the 2019 election.

=== Alcorcón ===
Population: 170,296

← Summary of the 28 May 2023 City Council of Alcorcón election results →
| Parties and alliances | Popular vote | | | Seats | |
| Parties and alliances | Votes | % | ±pp | Total | +/− |
|---|---|---|---|---|---|
| People's Party (PP) | 35,066 | 38.79 | +18.87 | 11 | +5 |
| Spanish Socialist Workers' Party (PSOE) | 23,416 | 25.90 | −3.33 | 8 | −1 |
| Winning Alcorcón (Ganar Alcorcón) | 14,183 | 15.69 | −1.98 | 4 | −1 |
| Vox (Vox) | 8,281 | 9.16 | +2.25 | 2 | ±0 |
| More Madrid–Greens Equo Alcorcón (MM–VQ Alcorcón) | 6,611 | 7.31 | +2.61 | 2 | +2 |
| Citizens–Party of the Citizenry (CS) | 1,300 | 1.44 | −17.62 | 0 | −5 |
| With You, We Are Democracy (Contigo) | 455 | 0.50 | New | 0 | ±0 |
| Blank ballots | 1,089 | 1.20 | +0.57 | | |
| Total | 90,401 | | | 27 | ±0 |
| Valid votes | 90,401 | 98.94 | −0.57 | | |
| Invalid votes | 972 | 1.06 | +0.57 | | |
| Votes cast / turnout | 91,373 | 70.93 | +2.12 | | |
| Abstentions | 37,443 | 29.07 | −2.12 | | |
| Registered voters | 128,816 | | | | |

=== Coslada ===
Population: 80,596

← Summary of the 28 May 2023 City Council of Coslada election results →
| Parties and alliances | Popular vote | | | Seats | |
| Parties and alliances | Votes | % | ±pp | Total | +/− |
|---|---|---|---|---|---|
| People's Party (PP) | 15,032 | 37.48 | +19.84 | 10 | +5 |
| Spanish Socialist Workers' Party (PSOE) | 9,871 | 24.61 | −1.62 | 7 | −1 |
| More Madrid–Greens Equo Coslada (MM–VQ Coslada) | 5,635 | 14.05 | +7.89 | 4 | +3 |
| Vox (Vox) | 3,993 | 9.96 | +3.00 | 2 | ±0 |
| We Can–United Left–Green Alliance (Podemos–IU–AV)^{1} | 2,938 | 7.32 | −9.09 | 2 | −2 |
| Citizens–Party of the Citizenry (CS) | 780 | 1.94 | −15.44 | 0 | −5 |
| Start, with Consciousness and Sense (Inicia o ICyS) | 660 | 1.65 | −1.25 | 0 | ±0 |
| Republican Group of Coslada (ARCO) | 417 | 1.04 | −0.14 | 0 | ±0 |
| With You, We Are Democracy (Contigo) | 228 | 0.57 | New | 0 | ±0 |
| Blank ballots | 556 | 1.39 | +0.50 | | |
| Total | 40,110 | | | 25 | ±0 |
| Valid votes | 40,110 | 98.69 | −0.62 | | |
| Invalid votes | 534 | 1.31 | +0.62 | | |
| Votes cast / turnout | 40,644 | 70.95 | +3.27 | | |
| Abstentions | 16,643 | 29.05 | −3.27 | | |
| Registered voters | 57,287 | | | | |
Sources
Footnotes: ^{1} We Can–United Left–Green Alliance results are compared to the combined totals of We Can and United Left–Stand Up Madrid–Equo–Anticapitalists in the 2019 election.

=== Fuenlabrada ===
Population: 189,891

← Summary of the 28 May 2023 City Council of Fuenlabrada election results →
| Parties and alliances | Popular vote | | | Seats | |
| Parties and alliances | Votes | % | ±pp | Total | +/− |
|---|---|---|---|---|---|
| Spanish Socialist Workers' Party (PSOE) | 51,889 | 54.34 | −1.21 | 16 | ±0 |
| People's Party (PP) | 23,258 | 24.36 | +13.45 | 7 | +4 |
| Vox (Vox) | 10,641 | 11.14 | +3.94 | 3 | +1 |
| More Madrid–Greens Equo Fuenlabrada (MM–VQ Fuenlabrada) | 5,190 | 5.44 | +0.41 | 1 | +1 |
| United Left–We Can–Green Alliance (IU–Podemos–AV) | 2,858 | 2.99 | −3.55 | 0 | −2 |
| Citizens–Party of the Citizenry (CS) | 878 | 0.92 | −12.37 | 0 | −4 |
| Blank ballots | 768 | 0.80 | +0.34 | | |
| Total | 95,482 | | | 27 | ±0 |
| Valid votes | 95,482 | 98.95 | 0.61 | | |
| Invalid votes | 1,017 | 1.05 | +0.61 | | |
| Votes cast / turnout | 96,499 | 68.39 | +6.36 | | |
| Abstentions | 44,603 | 31.61 | 6.36 | | |
| Registered voters | 141,102 | | | | |
Sources
Footnotes: ^{1} More Madrid–Greens Equo Fuenlabrada results are compared to the combined totals of More Madrid–Fuenlabrada and Equo in the 2019 election.

=== Getafe ===
Population: 183,219

← Summary of the 28 May 2023 City Council of Getafe election results →
| Parties and alliances | Popular vote | | | Seats | |
| Parties and alliances | Votes | % | ±pp | Total | +/− |
|---|---|---|---|---|---|
| Spanish Socialist Workers' Party (PSOE) | 33,691 | 36.28 | +1.12 | 10 | −1 |
| People's Party (PP) | 31,176 | 33.57 | +17.45 | 10 | +5 |
| More Madrid–Commitment to Getafe (MMCCG) | 10,059 | 10.83 | +5.30 | 3 | +2 |
| We Can–United Left–Green Alliance (Podemos–IU–AV)^{1} | 7,721 | 8.31 | −6.91 | 2 | −1 |
| Vox (Vox) | 7,338 | 7.90 | +1.40 | 2 | ±0 |
| Citizens–Party of the Citizenry (CS) | 1,797 | 1.94 | −13.79 | 0 | −5 |
| Blank ballots | 1,075 | 1.16 | +0.47 | | |
| Total | 92,857 | | | 27 | ±0 |
| Valid votes | 92,857 | 98.49 | −1.03 | | |
| Invalid votes | 1,422 | 1.51 | +1.03 | | |
| Votes cast / turnout | 94,279 | 70.27 | +1.93 | | |
| Abstentions | 39,892 | 29.73 | −1.93 | | |
| Registered voters | 134,171 | | | | |
Sources
Footnotes: ^{1} We Can–United Left–Green Alliance results are compared to the combined totals of We Can–Equo–Getafe Now and United Left–Stand Up Madrid in the 2019 election.

=== Las Rozas de Madrid ===
Population: 95,725

← Summary of the 28 May 2023 City Council of Las Rozas de Madrid election results →
| Parties and alliances | Popular vote | | | Seats | |
| Parties and alliances | Votes | % | ±pp | Total | +/− |
|---|---|---|---|---|---|
| People's Party (PP) | 31,969 | 60.52 | +18.38 | 18 | +6 |
| Vox (Vox) | 6,884 | 13.03 | +2.90 | 3 | +1 |
| Spanish Socialist Workers' Party (PSOE) | 6,652 | 12.59 | −2.45 | 3 | −1 |
| More Madrid–Greens Equo Las Rozas (MM–VQ Las Rozas) | 3,373 | 6.39 | +2.32 | 1 | +1 |
| Citizens–Party of the Citizenry (CS) | 1,661 | 3.14 | −18.08 | 0 | −6 |
| United Left–We Can–Green Alliance (IU–Podemos–AV) | 1,609 | 3.05 | −2.63 | 0 | −1 |
| Blank ballots | 677 | 1.28 | +0.65 | | |
| Total | 52,825 | | | 25 | ±0 |
| Valid votes | 52,825 | 99.37 | −0.36 | | |
| Invalid votes | 336 | 0.63 | +0.36 | | |
| Votes cast / turnout | 53,161 | 74.93 | +2.19 | | |
| Abstentions | 17,784 | 25.07 | −2.19 | | |
| Registered voters | 70,945 | | | | |

=== Leganés ===
Population: 186,660

← Summary of the 28 May 2023 City Council of Leganés election results →
| Parties and alliances | Popular vote | | | Seats | |
| Parties and alliances | Votes | % | ±pp | Total | +/− |
|---|---|---|---|---|---|
| People's Party (PP) | 30,611 | 31.70 | +16.32 | 9 | +5 |
| Spanish Socialist Workers' Party (PSOE) | 26,480 | 27.42 | −4.89 | 8 | −2 |
| Union for Leganés (ULEG) | 11,073 | 11.47 | −4.14 | 3 | −1 |
| More Madrid–Greens Equo Leganés (MM–VQ Leganés) | 10,248 | 10.61 | +3.27 | 3 | +1 |
| Vox (Vox) | 7,618 | 7.89 | +1.82 | 2 | +1 |
| We Can–United Left–Green Alliance (Podemos–IU–AV) | 6,374 | 6.60 | −4.54 | 2 | −1 |
| Leganemos (Leganemos) | 1,564 | 1.62 | New | 0 | ±0 |
| Citizens–Party of the Citizenry (CS) | 1,119 | 1.16 | −9.28 | 0 | −3 |
| Communist Party of the Peoples of Spain (PCPE) | 258 | 0.27 | New | 0 | ±0 |
| United for Democracy (Unidos–DEf) | 95 | 0.10 | New | 0 | ±0 |
| Blank ballots | 1,131 | 1.17 | +0.54 | | |
| Total | 96,571 | | | 27 | ±0 |
| Valid votes | 96,571 | 98.85 | −0.58 | | |
| Invalid votes | 1,126 | 1.15 | +0.58 | | |
| Votes cast / turnout | 97,697 | 69.45 | +3.06 | | |
| Abstentions | 42,978 | 30.55 | −3.06 | | |
| Registered voters | 140,675 | | | | |

=== Madrid ===
Population: 3,280,782

=== Móstoles ===
Population: 208,761

← Summary of the 28 May 2023 City Council of Móstoles election results →
| Parties and alliances | Popular vote | | | Seats | |
| Parties and alliances | Votes | % | ±pp | Total | +/− |
|---|---|---|---|---|---|
| People's Party (PP) | 38,204 | 37.37 | +16.57 | 12 | +6 |
| Spanish Socialist Workers' Party (PSOE) | 22,847 | 22.35 | −11.28 | 7 | −3 |
| More Madrid Móstoles (MM) | 15,908 | 15.56 | +7.17 | 4 | +2 |
| Vox (Vox) | 10,696 | 10.46 | +2.84 | 3 | +1 |
| We Can–United Left–Green Alliance (Podemos–IU–AV)^{1} | 5,424 | 5.31 | −3.58 | 1 | −1 |
| Móstoles, At Last! (MXF) | 3,136 | 3.07 | New | 0 | ±0 |
| We Are More (SomosMas) | 2,777 | 2.72 | New | 0 | ±0 |
| Citizens–Party of the Citizenry (CS) | 1,494 | 1.46 | −15.54 | 0 | −5 |
| Móstoles Alternative (ATM) | 433 | 0.42 | New | 0 | ±0 |
| Spanish Phalanx of the CNSO (FE de las JONS) | 93 | 0.09 | New | 0 | ±0 |
| Blank ballots | 1,216 | 1.19 | +0.49 | | |
| Total | 102,228 | | | 27 | ±0 |
| Valid votes | 102,228 | 98.50 | −0.96 | | |
| Invalid votes | 1,558 | 1.50 | +0.96 | | |
| Votes cast / turnout | 103,786 | 66.58 | +4.26 | | |
| Abstentions | 52,090 | 33.42 | −4.26 | | |
| Registered voters | 155,876 | | | | |
Sources
Footnotes: ^{1} We Can–United Left–Green Alliance results are compared to the combined totals of We Can and United Left–Stand Up Madrid in the 2019 election.

=== Parla ===
Population: 130,577

← Summary of the 28 May 2023 City Council of Parla election results →
| Parties and alliances | Popular vote | | | Seats | |
| Parties and alliances | Votes | % | ±pp | Total | +/− |
|---|---|---|---|---|---|
| Spanish Socialist Workers' Party (PSOE) | 18,500 | 37.89 | +8.97 | 11 | +2 |
| People's Party (PP) | 14,919 | 30.56 | +11.74 | 9 | +4 |
| Vox (Vox) | 5,848 | 11.98 | +1.52 | 3 | ±0 |
| More Madrid–Greens Equo Parla (MM–VQ Parla) | 3,644 | 7.46 | +2.57 | 2 | +2 |
| We Can–United Left–Green Alliance (Podemos–IU–AV) | 3,433 | 7.03 | −7.80 | 2 | −2 |
| Citizens–Party of the Citizenry (CS) | 860 | 1.76 | −11.43 | 0 | −4 |
| Animalist Party with the Environment (PACMA) | 791 | 1.62 | New | 0 | ±0 |
| With You, We Are Democracy (Contigo) | 154 | 0.32 | New | 0 | ±0 |
| Communist Party of the Peoples of Spain (PCPE) | 122 | 0.25 | New | 0 | ±0 |
| Parla Network Neighbourhood Organizational Movement (MOVER Parla) | n/a | n/a | −6.58 | 0 | −2 |
| Blank ballots | 555 | 1.14 | +0.48 | | |
| Total | 48,826 | | | 27 | ±0 |
| Valid votes | 48,826 | 98.47 | −0.87 | | |
| Invalid votes | 760 | 1.53 | +0.87 | | |
| Votes cast / turnout | 49,586 | 61.63 | +3.76 | | |
| Abstentions | 30,876 | 38.37 | −3.76 | | |
| Registered voters | 80,462 | | | | |

=== Pozuelo de Alarcón ===
Population: 87,728

← Summary of the 28 May 2023 City Council of Pozuelo de Alarcón election results →
| Parties and alliances | Popular vote | | | Seats | |
| Parties and alliances | Votes | % | ±pp | Total | +/− |
|---|---|---|---|---|---|
| People's Party (PP) | 27,576 | 55.77 | +15.48 | 17 | +6 |
| Vox (Vox) | 7,923 | 16.02 | +2.23 | 4 | ±0 |
| Spanish Socialist Workers' Party (PSOE) | 6,487 | 13.12 | −2.90 | 3 | −1 |
| More Madrid–We Are Pozuelo–United Left (MM–SPoz–IU)^{1} | 2,748 | 5.56 | −1.26 | 1 | ±0 |
| Neighbours for Pozuelo de Alarcón (VporP) | 1,651 | 3.34 | +0.66 | 0 | ±0 |
| Citizens–Party of the Citizenry (CS) | 1,438 | 2.91 | −16.55 | 0 | −5 |
| We Can–Green Alliance (Podemos–AV) | 645 | 1.30 | New | 0 | ±0 |
| More With You (CNTG+) | 444 | 0.90 | New | 0 | ±0 |
| Blank ballots | 534 | 1.08 | +0.50 | | |
| Total | 49,446 | | | 25 | ±0 |
| Valid votes | 49,446 | 99.50 | −0.78 | | |
| Invalid votes | 249 | 0.50 | +0.78 | | |
| Votes cast / turnout | 49,695 | 76.29 | +1.42 | | |
| Abstentions | 15,445 | 23.71 | −1.42 | | |
| Registered voters | 65,140 | | | | |
Sources
Footnotes: ^{1} More Madrid–We Are Pozuelo–United Left results are compared to We Are Pozuelo–More Madrid–United Left–Equo totals in the 2019 election.

=== Rivas-Vaciamadrid ===
Population: 96,690

← Summary of the 28 May 2023 City Council of Rivas-Vaciamadrid election results →
| Parties and alliances | Popular vote | | | Seats | |
| Parties and alliances | Votes | % | ±pp | Total | +/− |
|---|---|---|---|---|---|
| People's Party (PP) | 16,778 | 31.63 | +22.53 | 9 | +7 |
| United Left–More Madrid–Greens Equo (IU–MM–VQ) | 15,901 | 29.98 | +3.76 | 9 | +2 |
| Spanish Socialist Workers' Party (PSOE) | 9,185 | 17.32 | −5.91 | 5 | −2 |
| Vox (Vox) | 4,577 | 8.63 | +1.71 | 2 | ±0 |
| Neighbours for Rivas-Vaciamadrid (VxR) | 2,625 | 4.95 | +3.09 | 0 | ±0 |
| We Can–Green Alliance (Podemos–AV) | 2,167 | 4.09 | −4.40 | 0 | −2 |
| Citizens–Party of the Citizenry (CS) | 845 | 1.59 | −15.77 | 0 | −5 |
| With You, We Are Democracy (Contigo) | 363 | 0.68 | +0.43 | 0 | ±0 |
| Blank ballots | 596 | 1.12 | +0.54 | | |
| Total | 53,037 | | | 25 | ±0 |
| Valid votes | 53,037 | 99.04 | −0.58 | | |
| Invalid votes | 513 | 0.96 | +0.58 | | |
| Votes cast / turnout | 53,550 | 75.67 | +3.95 | | |
| Abstentions | 17,218 | 24.33 | −3.95 | | |
| Registered voters | 70,768 | | | | |

=== San Sebastián de los Reyes ===
Population: 91,083

← Summary of the 28 May 2023 City Council of San Sebastián de los Reyes election results →
| Parties and alliances | Popular vote | | | Seats | |
| Parties and alliances | Votes | % | ±pp | Total | +/− |
|---|---|---|---|---|---|
| People's Party (PP) | 18,672 | 40.05 | +16.27 | 11 | +4 |
| Spanish Socialist Workers' Party (PSOE) | 9,454 | 20.28 | −5.40 | 6 | −1 |
| Independent Left–Initiative for San Sebastián de los Reyes (II–ISSR) | 5,703 | 12.23 | +2.23 | 3 | +1 |
| Vox (Vox) | 4,687 | 10.05 | +2.61 | 3 | +1 |
| More Madrid–Greens Equo San Sebastián de los Reyes (MM–VQ SSR) | 2,772 | 5.95 | +0.62 | 1 | ±0 |
| Neighbours for Sanse–Citizens (VxSSR–CS)^{1} | 2,553 | 5.48 | −13.02 | 1 | −4 |
| We Can–United Left–Green Alliance (Podemos–IU–AV)^{2} | 2,068 | 4.44 | −0.61 | 0 | −1 |
| Humanist Party (PH) | 136 | 0.29 | +0.10 | 0 | ±0 |
| Blank ballots | 576 | 1.24 | +0.35 | | |
| Total | 46,621 | | | 25 | ±0 |
| Valid votes | 46,621 | 98.97 | −0.47 | | |
| Invalid votes | 486 | 1.03 | +0.47 | | |
| Votes cast / turnout | 47,107 | 71.20 | +4.71 | | |
| Abstentions | 19,052 | 28.80 | −4.71 | | |
| Registered voters | 66,159 | | | | |
Sources
Footnotes: ^{1} Neighbours for Sanse–Citizens results are compared to Citizens–Party of the Citizenry totals in the 2019 election.; ^{2} We Can–United Left–Green Alliance results are compared to We Can totals in the 2019 election.

=== Torrejón de Ardoz ===
Population: 134,733

← Summary of the 28 May 2023 City Council of Torrejón de Ardoz election results →
| Parties and alliances | Popular vote | | | Seats | |
| Parties and alliances | Votes | % | ±pp | Total | +/− |
|---|---|---|---|---|---|
| People's Party (PP) | 42,302 | 66.32 | +8.78 | 21 | +2 |
| Spanish Socialist Workers' Party (PSOE) | 10,602 | 16.62 | −3.69 | 5 | −1 |
| More Madrid (Más Madrid)^{1} | 3,943 | 6.18 | +3.49 | 1 | +1 |
| We Can–United Left–Green Alliance (Podemos–IU–AV)^{2} | 2,884 | 4.52 | −6.44 | 0 | −1 |
| Vox (Vox) | 2,103 | 3.30 | +0.88 | 0 | ±0 |
| With You, We Are Democracy (Contigo) | 1,078 | 1.69 | New | 0 | ±0 |
| Citizens–Party of the Citizenry (CS) | 287 | 0.45 | −4.13 | 0 | ±0 |
| Blank ballots | 589 | 0.92 | +0.11 | | |
| Total | 63,788 | | | 27 | ±0 |
| Valid votes | 63,788 | 98.81 | −0.78 | | |
| Invalid votes | 769 | 1.19 | +0.78 | | |
| Votes cast / turnout | 64,557 | 65.30 | +0.98 | | |
| Abstentions | 34,302 | 34.70 | −0.98 | | |
| Registered voters | 98,859 | | | | |
Sources
Footnotes: ^{1} More Madrid results are compared to Neighbours for Torrejón–More Madrid–Equo totals in the 2019 election.; ^{2} We Can–United Left–Green Alliance results are compared to the combined totals of We Can and United Left–Stand Up Madrid in the 2019 election.

== See also ==
- 2023 Madrilenian regional election
