= Opinion polling for the 2019 Spanish local elections (Community of Madrid) =

In the run up to the 2019 Spanish local elections, various organizations carried out opinion polling to gauge voting intention in local entities in Spain. The results of such polls for municipalities in the Community of Madrid are displayed in this article. The date range for these opinion polls is from the previous local elections, held on 24 May 2015, to the day the next elections were held, on 26 May 2019.

Polls are listed in reverse chronological order, showing the most recent first and using the dates when the survey fieldwork was done, as opposed to the date of publication, except where the fieldwork dates are unknown. The highest percentage figure in each polling survey is displayed with its background shaded in the leading party's colour. If a tie ensues, this is applied to the figures with the highest percentages. The "Lead" columns on the right shows the percentage-point difference between the parties with the highest percentages in a given poll.

== Municipalities ==
=== Alcalá de Henares ===
Polling firm/Commissioner	Fieldwork date	Sample size	Turnout	PP	PSOE	Somos Alcalá	Cs	E-2000	IU–Madrid	Vox	Podemos–IU	Lead
2019 municipal election	26 May 2019	—N/a	64.6	17.0; 5	37.0; 12	4.4; 0	19.2; 6	3.2; 0	(Note: Within Podemos–IU.)	8.0; 2	7.5; 2	17.8
Henares Hoy TV	9 May 2018	?	70–72	? 5/6	? 6	? 4	? 9	? 2/3	? 0	–	–	?
2015 municipal election	24 May 2015	—N/a	66.0	24.1; 8	23.8; 7	20.5; 6	13.5; 4	5.8; 1	5.3; 1	0.5; 0	–	0.3

=== Alcobendas ===
Polling firm/Commissioner	Fieldwork date	Sample size	Turnout	PP	PSOE	Cs	Podemos	UPyD	IU–Madrid	Vox	Lead
2019 municipal election	26 May 2019	—N/a	67.4	34.3; 10	30.5; 9	15.8; 5	5.7; 1	–	2.4; 0	6.8; 2	3.8
Metroscopia/PP	4–5 Dec 2018	500	?	32.9; 10	22.5; 7	19.4; 6	9.3; 2	–	6.1; 1	5.6; 1	10.4
Celeste-Tel	26–30 Nov 2018	600	64.0	28.2; 8	22.1; 7	19.6; 6	9.8; 3	–	4.5; 0	9.8; 3	6.1
Metroscopia/PP	22 Dec 2016	500	?	? 12	? 5	? 5	? 5	–	–	–	?
2015 municipal election	24 May 2015	—N/a	67.5	38.5; 12	21.9; 7	11.7; 3	10.4 (Note: Results for SSPACxM.); 3	5.8; 1	5.0; 1	1.2; 0	16.6

=== Alcorcón ===
Polling firm/Commissioner	Fieldwork date	Sample size	Turnout	PP	PSOE	Ganar Alcorcón	Cs	IU–Madrid	Vox	Lead
2019 municipal election	26 May 2019	—N/a	68.8	19.9; 6	29.2; 9	17.7; 5	19.1; 5	(Note: Within GA.)	6.9; 2	9.3
Sigma Dos/Al Cabo de la Calle	10–13 May 2019	700	?	24.8; 8	33.7; 11	11.7; 4	13.8; 4	–	4.0; 0	8.9
PP	21 Mar 2019	?	?	? 7	? 10	? 4	? 4	–	? 2	?
Sigma Dos/PP	30 Oct 2018	?	?	? 8	? 9	? 4	? 6	–	–	?
2015 municipal election	24 May 2015	—N/a	70.1	31.1; 10	24.3; 7	17.4; 5	12.7; 4	5.9; 1	–	6.8

=== Arganda del Rey ===
Polling firm/Commissioner	Fieldwork date	Sample size	Turnout	PP	PSOE	Cs	AA	IU–Madrid	ASP	E-2000	Vox	Podemos–IU	Lead
2019 municipal election	26 May 2019	—N/a	60.6	21.1; 6	45.5; 13	11.1; 3	3.3; 0			–	8.5; 2	6.8; 1	24.4
Henares Hoy TV	9 May 2018	?	70	? 6	? 5	? 8	? 1	? 2	? 2	? 1	–	–	?
2015 municipal election	24 May 2015	—N/a	60.3	32.0; 9	20.0; 6	13.1; 4	9.3; 2	8.4; 2	6.7; 2	–	–	–	12.0

=== Ciempozuelos ===
Polling firm/Commissioner	Fieldwork date	Sample size	Turnout	AHC	PSOE	PP	CPCI	PIC	Cs	Vox	Lead
2019 municipal election	26 May 2019	—N/a	58.2	17.9; 5	26.6; 6	17.1; 4	16.0; 3	–	12.3; 2	9.1; 2	8.7
ZigZag Digital	4 May 2019	?	?	22.0; 5	25.1; 6	19.5; 4	12.1; 3	–	11.9; 2	7.5; 1	3.1
ZigZag Digital	10–17 Jul 2017	402	61.5	29.4; 7	21.8; 5	20.5; 4/5	18.4; 4	4.7; 0/1	–	–	7.6
2015 municipal election	24 May 2015	—N/a	59.5	29.3; 7	21.1; 5	20.3; 4	14.9; 3	10.3; 2	–	–	8.2

=== Coslada ===
Polling firm/Commissioner	Fieldwork date	Sample size	Turnout	PP	PSOE	Podemos	Cs	IU–Madrid	ARCO	E-2000	Vox	Más Madrid	Lead
2019 municipal election	26 May 2019	—N/a	67.7	17.6; 5	26.2; 8	12.7; 4	17.4; 5	3.7; 0	1.2; 0	0.3; 0	7.0; 1	6.2; 1	8.6
Henares Hoy TV	9 May 2018	?	70	? 5	? 8	? 4	? 6	? 1	–	? 1	–	–	?
2015 municipal election	24 May 2015	—N/a	69.6	24.9; 7	23.0; 6	19.4 (Note: Results for SmC.); 5	11.1; 3	10.5; 3	5.3; 1	–	–	–	1.9

=== Fuenlabrada ===
Polling firm/Commissioner	Fieldwork date	Sample size	Turnout	PSOE	PP	GF	Cs	IU–Madrid	Vox	Podemos–IU	Lead
2019 municipal election	26 May 2019	—N/a	62.0	55.6; 16	10.9; 3		13.3; 4		7.2; 2	6.5; 2	42.3
Sigma Dos/Al Cabo de la Calle	1–3 Apr 2019	700	?	62.4; 19	9.8; 2/3	6.3; 1/2	9.2; 2	–	6.7; 2	–	52.6
PP	10 Mar 2019	?	?	? 15	? 4	? 3	? 3	–	? 2	–	?
Sigma Dos/PP	30 Oct 2018	?	?	? 15	? 5	? 2	? 5	–	–	–	?
2015 municipal election	24 May 2015	—N/a	64.9	45.2; 13	16.9; 5	14.5; 4	13.1; 4	5.7; 1	0.9; 0	–	28.3

=== Getafe ===
Polling firm/Commissioner	Fieldwork date	Sample size	Turnout	PP	PSOE	Podemos	Cs	IU–MeP	Vox	MMCCG	Lead
2019 municipal election	26 May 2019	—N/a	68.3	16.1; 5	35.2; 11	12.6; 3	15.7; 5	2.6; 0	6.5; 2	5.5; 1	19.1
PP	10 Mar 2019	?	?	? 6	? 11	? 5	? 4	–	? 1	–	?
Celeste-Tel/Getafe Capital	12–16 Nov 2018	600	66.3	22.4; 6	32.6; 10	24.1; 7	13.0; 3	–	6.4; 1	–	10.2
Sigma Dos/PP	30 Oct 2018	?	?	? 6	? 10	? 5	? 6	–	–	–	?
Celeste-Tel/Getafe Actualidad	22–31 Jan 2018	600	67.5	25.2; 7	30.1; 9	21.9; 6	13.2; 4	6.0; 1	–	–	4.9
2015 municipal election	24 May 2015	—N/a	70.0	28.6; 9	27.3; 8	23.6 (Note: Results for Ahora Getafe.); 7	8.1; 2	5.7; 1	–	–	1.3

=== Leganés ===
Polling firm/Commissioner	Fieldwork date	Sample size	Turnout	PSOE	MM–L		PP	Cs	IU–Madrid	Vox	Podemos	Actúa	Podemos–IU	Lead
2019 municipal election	26 May 2019	—N/a	66.4	32.3; 10	7.3; 2	15.6; 4	15.4; 4	10.4; 3		6.1; 1		–	11.1; 3	16.7
Leganews	30 Apr–5 May 2019	722	?	? 7	? 2	? 7	? 3	? 3		? 3		–	? 2	Tie
Sigma Dos/Al Cabo de la Calle	28 Mar–1 Apr 2019	700	?	35.0; 10/11	8.2; 2	14.9; 4/5	16.6; 5	6.5; 2	–	3.7; 0	11.8; 3	–	–	18.4
PP	10 Mar 2019	?	?	? 8	? 6	? 3	? 5	? 3	–	? 2	(Note: Within Leganemos.)	–	–	?
Sigma Dos/PP	30 Oct 2018	?	?	? 8	? 4	? 6	? 5	? 4	–	–		–	–	?
Soyde	8 Jun 2018	300	?	31.0; 8	? 3	9.4; 3	21.0; 6	18.0; 5	–	–		? 1	–	10.0
Leganews	10 May 2018	1,020	?	20.2; 6	21.4; 6	11.8; 4	22.3; 7	7.0; 2	4.5; 1	5.9; 1		–	–	0.9
Nuevo Crónica	9–12 Apr 2018	188	?	20.2; 5/6	14.9; 4	30.5; 9	13.8; 4	15.6; 4/5	<4.0; 0	1.5; 0		–	–	10.3
2015 municipal election	24 May 2015	—N/a	69.2	21.7; 6	21.1; 6	20.4; 6	20.0; 6	7.9; 2	5.3; 1	0.6; 0		–	–	0.6

=== Móstoles ===
Polling firm/Commissioner	Fieldwork date	Sample size	Turnout	PP	PSOE	MMGM	IU–Madrid	Cs	Actúa	Vox	Podemos	Lead
2019 municipal election	26 May 2019	—N/a	62.3	20.8; 6	33.6; 10	8.4; 2	1.5; 0	17.0; 5	–	7.6; 2	7.4; 2	12.8
PP	10 Mar 2019	?	?	? 9	? 9	? 5	–	? 3	–	? 1	–	Tie
Sigma Dos/PP	30 Oct 2018	?	?	? 10	? 8	? 6	–	? 3	–	–	–	?
Celeste-Tel/Móstoles Actualidad	30 May 2018	?	59.4	27.8; 8	26.6; 8	18.3; 5	6.6; 2	16.1; 4	–	–	–	1.2
Soyde	17 May 2018	298	?	23.2; 6	21.3; 6	? 2	? 3	25.9; 7	? 2	–	–	2.7
2015 municipal election	24 May 2015	—N/a	65.0	36.3; 12	23.1; 7	19.9; 6	6.0; 2	0.0; 0	–	–	–	13.2

=== Paracuellos de Jarama ===
Polling firm/Commissioner	Fieldwork date	Sample size	Turnout	ICxP	PP	Cs	SP	UxP	PSOE	IU–Madrid	Unidas Podemos	MVP	Lead
2019 municipal election	26 May 2019	—N/a	71.1	18.5; 4	11.4; 2	23.5; 6	9.2; 2	–	11.9; 2		7.0; 1	5.7; 1	5.0
Henares Hoy TV	9 May 2018	?	74	? 4	? 2	? 6	? 2	? 2	? 3	? 2	–	–	?
2015 municipal election	24 May 2015	—N/a	68.5	22.0; 5	18.4; 5	17.3; 4	12.6; 3	10.2; 2	7.1; 1	6.9; 1	–	–	3.6

=== Parla ===
Polling firm/Commissioner	Fieldwork date	Sample size	Turnout	PP	MP	CP	PSOE	IU–Madrid	Vox	Cs	Lead
2019 municipal election	25 May 2019	—N/a	57.9	18.8; 5	6.5; 2	14.8; 4	28.9; 9		10.5; 3	13.2; 4	10.1
PP	10 Mar 2019	?	?	? 6	? 3	? 6	? 5	–	? 3	? 4	Tie
Sigma Dos/PP	30 Oct 2018	?	?	? 8	? 4	? 7	? 3	? 0	–	? 5	?
2015 municipal election	24 May 2015	—N/a	62.4	23.2; 7	19.4; 6	18.6 (Note: Results for Cambiemos Parla.); 6	16.1; 5	9.6; 3	1.5; 0	–	3.8

=== Pinto ===
Polling firm/Commissioner	Fieldwork date	Sample size	Turnout	PP	GP	PSOE	Cs	Vox	Podemos	SP	Actúa	Lead
2019 municipal election	26 May 2019	—N/a	68.3	24.4; 7	13.9; 4	32.7; 9	12.4; 3	5.2; 1	5.4; 1	4.1; 0	0.9; 0	8.3
ZigZag Digital	20 Mar–5 Apr 2019	722	?	24.7; 7/8	19.0; 4/5	25.8; 7/8	12.5; 3/4	5.0; 1	5.0; 1	4.5; 0/1	2.0; 0	1.1
ZigZag Digital	31 May–9 Jun 2017	468	69.8	36.7; 9/10	28.8; 7/8	22.1; 6	8.5; 2	–	(Note: Within Ganemos Pinto.)	–	–	7.9
2015 municipal election	24 May 2015	—N/a	68.4	31.3; 7	27.8; 7	20.9; 5	10.0; 2	0.6; 0		–	–	3.5

=== Pozuelo de Alarcón ===
Polling firm/Commissioner	Fieldwork date	Sample size	Turnout	PP	Cs	PSOE	SPoz	Vox	VpP	Lead
2019 municipal election	26 May 2019	—N/a	74.9	40.3; 11	19.5; 5	16.0; 4	6.8; 1	13.8; 4	2.7; 0	20.8
PP	21 Mar 2019	?	?	? 12	? 3	? 3	? 1	? 6	–	?
El Correo de Pozuelo	1 Oct 2018	?	?	? 10/11	? 7/8	? 3/4	? 0/1	? 0/2	? 0/1	?
2015 municipal election	24 May 2015	—N/a	72.4	45.8; 14	19.5; 5	11.5; 3	11.2; 3	4.3; 0	–	26.3

=== San Fernando de Henares ===
Polling firm/Commissioner	Fieldwork date	Sample size	Turnout	PP	Más Madrid	PSOE	IU–Madrid	E-2000	Cs	Podemos	Vox	Actúa	Lead
2019 municipal election	26 May 2019	—N/a	69.5	12.7; 3	10.5; 2	26.4; 6	6.5; 1	6.7; 1	19.8; 5	5.3; 1	5.1; 1	6.3; 1	6.6
SW Demoscopia/MiraCorredor	18–21 Mar 2019	507	?	? 2/3	? 5/6	? 6/7	? 0/1	? 0/1	? 3/4	? 0/1	? 1/2	? 0/1	?
Henares Hoy TV	9 May 2018	?	65	? 3	? 2	? 5	? 1	? 2	? 7	–	–	–	?
2015 municipal election	24 May 2015	—N/a	69.3	24.6; 6	23.9; 5	21.2; 5	16.4; 4	6.5; 1	–	–	–	–	0.7

=== Torrejón de Ardoz ===
Polling firm/Commissioner	Fieldwork date	Sample size	Turnout	PP	Podemos	PSOE	Cs	IU–Madrid	Lead
2019 municipal election	26 May 2019	—N/a	64.3	57.5; 19	6.7; 2	20.3; 6	4.6; 0	4.3; 0	37.2
Henares Hoy TV	9 May 2018	?	75	? 10	? 3	? 4	? 7	? 3	?
2015 municipal election	24 May 2015	—N/a	65.9	48.9; 14	16.3; 5	15.0; 4	7.2; 2	7.0; 2	32.6

=== Velilla de San Antonio ===
Polling firm/Commissioner	Fieldwork date	Sample size	Turnout	PSOE	PP	SV	IU–Madrid	VIVE	E-2000	UPyD	Cs	Vox	Lead
2019 municipal election	26 May 2019	—N/a	69.3	34.5; 7	10.2; 2	8.8; 1	9.4; 1	6.8; 1	10.2; 2	–	11.2; 2	7.8; 1	23.3
Henares Hoy TV	9 May 2018	?	70	? 3	? 2	? 2	? 2	? 1	? 1	–	? 6	–	?
2015 municipal election	24 May 2015	—N/a	69.7	21.5; 4	20.6; 4	18.4; 4	13.0; 2	8.8; 1	5.9; 1	5.4; 1	–	–	0.9
