= 2019 Spanish local elections in the Community of Madrid =

This article presents the results breakdown of the local elections held in the Community of Madrid on 26 May 2019. The following tables show detailed results in the autonomous community's most populous municipalities, sorted alphabetically.

== City control ==
The following table lists party control in the most populous municipalities, including provincial capitals (shown in bold). Gains for a party are displayed with the cell's background shaded in that party's colour.

Municipality	Population	Previous control	New control
Alcalá de Henares	193,751	Spanish Socialist Workers' Party (PSOE)	Spanish Socialist Workers' Party (PSOE)
Alcobendas	116,037	People's Party (PP)	Spanish Socialist Workers' Party (PSOE)
Alcorcón	169,502	People's Party (PP)	Spanish Socialist Workers' Party (PSOE)
Coslada	81,860	Spanish Socialist Workers' Party (PSOE)	Spanish Socialist Workers' Party (PSOE)
Fuenlabrada	193,586	Spanish Socialist Workers' Party (PSOE)	Spanish Socialist Workers' Party (PSOE)
Getafe	180,747	Spanish Socialist Workers' Party (PSOE)	Spanish Socialist Workers' Party (PSOE)
Las Rozas de Madrid	95,550	People's Party (PP)	People's Party (PP)
Leganés	188,425	Spanish Socialist Workers' Party (PSOE)	Spanish Socialist Workers' Party (PSOE)
**Madrid**	3,223,334	More Madrid (Más Madrid)	People's Party (PP)
Móstoles	207,095	Spanish Socialist Workers' Party (PSOE)	Spanish Socialist Workers' Party (PSOE)
Parla	128,256	People's Party (PP)	Spanish Socialist Workers' Party (PSOE)
Pozuelo de Alarcón	86,172	People's Party (PP)	People's Party (PP)
Rivas-Vaciamadrid	85,893	United Left (IU)	United Left (IU)
San Sebastián de los Reyes	87,724	Spanish Socialist Workers' Party (PSOE)	Spanish Socialist Workers' Party (PSOE)
Torrejón de Ardoz	129,729	People's Party (PP)	People's Party (PP)

== Municipalities ==
=== Alcalá de Henares ===
Population: 193,751

← Summary of the 26 May 2019 City Council of Alcalá de Henares election results →
Parties and alliances	Popular vote			Seats	
Parties and alliances	Votes	%	±pp	Total	+/−
Spanish Socialist Workers' Party (PSOE)	33,138	37.05	+13.21	12	+5
Citizens–Party of the Citizenry (Cs)	17,177	19.20	+5.66	6	+2
People's Party (PP)	15,226	17.02	−7.06	5	−3
Vox (Vox)	7,127	7.97	+7.42	2	+2
United We Can–United Left (Podemos–IU)^{1}	6,729	7.52	+2.24	2	+1
We Are Alcalá–Equo (Somos Alcalá)	3,948	4.41	−16.06	0	−6
Spain 2000 (E–2000)	2,893	3.23	−2.59	0	−1
More Madrid (Más Madrid)	2,094	2.34	New	0	±0
Act–The Left Today–The Greens (PACT–LIH–GMLV)	335	0.37	New	0	±0
Humanist Party (PH)	190	0.21	+0.05	0	±0
Blank ballots	585	0.65	−0.69		
Total	89,442			27	±0
Valid votes	89,442	99.47	+0.63		
Invalid votes	479	0.53	−0.63		
Votes cast / turnout	89,921	64.63	−1.39		
Abstentions	49,213	35.37	+1.39		
Registered voters	139,134				
Sources
Footnotes: ^{1} United We Can–United Left results are compared to United Left of the Community of Madrid–The Greens totals in the 2015 election.

=== Alcobendas ===
Population: 116,037

← Summary of the 26 May 2019 City Council of Alcobendas election results →
Parties and alliances	Popular vote			Seats	
Parties and alliances	Votes	%	±pp	Total	+/−
People's Party (PP)	18,784	34.33	−4.13	10	−2
Spanish Socialist Workers' Party (PSOE)	16,662	30.45	+8.55	9	+2
Citizens–Party of the Citizenry (Cs)	8,615	15.75	+4.03	5	+2
Vox (Vox)	3,743	6.84	+5.65	2	+2
We Can (Podemos)^{1}	3,126	5.71	−4.69	1	−2
More Madrid–Alcobendas (MMAlcobendas)	1,660	3.03	New	0	±0
United Left–Stand Up Madrid (IU–MeP)^{2}	1,302	2.38	−2.66	0	−1
With You, We Are Democracy (Contigo)	415	0.76	New	0	±0
Humanist Party (PH)	94	0.17	−0.18	0	±0
Union, Progress and Democracy (UPyD)	n/a	n/a	−5.83	0	−1
Blank ballots	312	0.57	−0.95		
Total	54,713			27	±0
Valid votes	54,713	99.64	+0.70		
Invalid votes	196	0.36	−0.70		
Votes cast / turnout	54,909	67.37	−0.16		
Abstentions	26,598	32.63	+0.16		
Registered voters	81,507				
Sources
Footnotes: ^{1} We Can results are compared to Yes We Can, Citizens' Alternative for Madrid totals in the 2015 election.; ^{2} United Left–Stand Up Madrid results are compared to United Left of the Community of Madrid–The Greens totals in the 2015 election.

=== Alcorcón ===
Population: 169,502

← Summary of the 26 May 2019 City Council of Alcorcón election results →
Parties and alliances	Popular vote			Seats	
Parties and alliances	Votes	%	±pp	Total	+/−
Spanish Socialist Workers' Party (PSOE)	25,602	29.23	+4.93	9	+2
People's Party (PP)	17,448	19.92	−11.20	6	−4
Citizens–Party of the Citizenry (Cs)	16,695	19.06	+6.36	5	+1
Winning Alcorcón (Ganar Alcorcón)^{1}	15,478	17.67	−5.63	5	−1
Vox (Vox)	6,054	6.91	New	2	+2
More Madrid–Alcorcón (MM–Alcorcón)	4,117	4.70	New	0	±0
The Greens–Green Group (LV–GV)	762	0.87	−2.18	0	±0
Act–The Greens (PACT–GMLV)	496	0.57	New	0	±0
The Left Today (LIH)	374	0.43	New	0	±0
Blank ballots	552	0.63	−0.68		
Total	87,578			27	±0
Valid votes	87,578	99.51	+0.72		
Invalid votes	432	0.49	−0.72		
Votes cast / turnout	88,010	68.81	−1.28		
Abstentions	39,895	31.19	+1.28		
Registered voters	127,905				
Sources
Footnotes: ^{1} Winning Alcorcón results are compared to the combined totals of Winning Alcorcón and United Left of the Community of Madrid–The Greens in the 2015 election.

=== Coslada ===
Population: 81,860

← Summary of the 26 May 2019 City Council of Coslada election results →
Parties and alliances	Popular vote			Seats	
Parties and alliances	Votes	%	±pp	Total	+/−
Spanish Socialist Workers' Party (PSOE)	10,374	26.23	+3.22	8	+2
People's Party (PP)	6,977	17.64	−7.29	5	−2
Citizens–Party of the Citizenry (Cs)	6,876	17.38	+6.24	5	+2
We Can (Podemos)^{1}	5,029	12.71	−6.68	4	−1
Vox (Vox)	2,753	6.96	New	2	+2
More Madrid (Más Madrid)	2,437	6.16	New	1	+1
United Left–Stand Up Madrid–Equo–Anticapitalists (IU–MeP–EQ–ANT)^{2}	1,462	3.70	−6.84	0	−3
Act–The Left Today–The Greens (PACT–LIH–GMLV)	1,421	3.59	New	0	±0
Start, with Consciousness and Sense (Inicia o ICyS)	1,146	2.90	New	0	±0
Republican Group of Coslada (ARCO)	466	1.18	−4.12	0	−1
Spain 2000 (E–2000)	132	0.33	New	0	±0
The Centre (C)	129	0.33	New	0	±0
Blank ballots	353	0.89	−0.74		
Total	39,555			27	±0
Valid votes	39,555	99.31	+0.78		
Invalid votes	273	0.69	−0.78		
Votes cast / turnout	39,828	67.68	−1.97		
Abstentions	19,020	32.32	+1.97		
Registered voters	58,848				
Sources
Footnotes: ^{1} We Can results are compared to We Are Coslada totals in the 2015 election.; ^{2} United Left–Stand Up Madrid–Equo–Anticapitalists results are compared to United Left of the Community of Madrid–The Greens totals in the 2015 election.

=== Fuenlabrada ===
Population: 193,586

← Summary of the 26 May 2019 City Council of Fuenlabrada election results →
Parties and alliances	Popular vote			Seats	
Parties and alliances	Votes	%	±pp	Total	+/−
Spanish Socialist Workers' Party (PSOE)	48,737	55.55	+10.31	16	+3
Citizens–Party of the Citizenry (Cs)	11,665	13.29	+0.17	4	±0
People's Party (PP)	9,573	10.91	−6.02	3	−2
Vox (Vox)	6,317	7.20	+6.34	2	+2
United We Can–United Left–Winning Fuenlabrada (Podemos–IU–GF)^{1}	5,741	6.54	−13.62	2	−3
More Madrid–Fuenlabrada (MM–Fuenlabrada)	3,216	3.67	New	0	±0
Equo (Equo)	1,197	1.36	New	0	±0
Act–The Left Today–The Greens (PACT–LIH–GMLV)	892	1.02	New	0	±0
Blank ballots	402	0.46	−0.75		
Total	87,740			27	±0
Valid votes	87,740	99.56	+0.75		
Invalid votes	385	0.44	−0.75		
Votes cast / turnout	88,125	62.03	−2.83		
Abstentions	53,944	37.97	+2.83		
Registered voters	142,069				
Sources
Footnotes: ^{1} United We Can–United Left–Winning Fuenlabrada results are compared to the combined totals of Winning Fuenlabrada and United Left of the Community of Madrid–The Greens in the 2015 election.

=== Getafe ===
Population: 180,747

← Summary of the 26 May 2019 City Council of Getafe election results →
Parties and alliances	Popular vote			Seats	
Parties and alliances	Votes	%	±pp	Total	+/−
Spanish Socialist Workers' Party (PSOE)	31,626	35.16	+7.86	11	+3
People's Party (PP)	14,502	16.12	−12.45	5	−4
Citizens–Party of the Citizenry (Cs)	14,146	15.73	+7.61	5	+3
We Can–Equo–Getafe Now (Podemos–Equo)^{1}	11,319	12.58	−11.03	3	−4
Vox (Vox)	5,847	6.50	+5.83	2	+2
More Madrid–Commitment to Getafe (MMCCG)	4,979	5.53	New	1	+1
Boosting Getafe (IGE)	3,500	3.89	New	0	±0
United Left–Stand Up Madrid (IU–MeP)^{2}	2,378	2.64	−3.07	0	−1
Act–The Greens (PACT–GMLV)	677	0.75	New	0	±0
Union, Progress and Democracy (UPyD)	231	0.26	−2.74	0	±0
Diverse Citizens Party (PCiD)	131	0.15	New	0	±0
Blank ballots	620	0.69	−0.52		
Total	89,956			27	±0
Valid votes	89,956	99.52	+0.60		
Invalid votes	434	0.48	−0.60		
Votes cast / turnout	90,390	68.34	−1.63		
Abstentions	41,881	31.66	+1.63		
Registered voters	132,271				
Sources
Footnotes: ^{1} We Can–Equo–Getafe Now results are compared to Getafe Now totals in the 2015 election.; ^{2} United Left–Stand Up Madrid results are compared to United Left of the Community of Madrid–The Greens totals in the 2015 election.

=== Las Rozas de Madrid ===
Population: 95,550

← Summary of the 26 May 2019 City Council of Las Rozas de Madrid election results →
Parties and alliances	Popular vote			Seats	
Parties and alliances	Votes	%	±pp	Total	+/−
People's Party (PP)	20,592	42.14	+4.11	12	+1
Citizens–Party of the Citizenry (Cs)	10,370	21.22	+0.52	6	±0
Spanish Socialist Workers' Party (PSOE)	7,350	15.04	+4.00	4	+1
Vox (Vox)	4,948	10.13	+6.68	2	+2
United We Can–United Left (Podemos–IU)^{1}	2,775	5.68	−6.03	1	−2
More Madrid Las Rozas (MM Las Rozas)	1,990	4.07	New	0	±0
With You for Las Rozas–Yes We Can–Act–The Greens (CPLR–SSP–PACT–LV)^{2}	534	1.09	−3.01	0	±0
Union, Progress and Democracy (UPyD)	n/a	n/a	−6.54	0	−2
Blank ballots	586	0.63	−1.30		
Total	48,867			25	±0
Valid votes	48,867	99.73	+0.51		
Invalid votes	130	0.27	−0.51		
Votes cast / turnout	48,997	72.74	+2.56		
Abstentions	18,362	27.26	−2.56		
Registered voters	67,359				
Sources
Footnotes: ^{1} United We Can–United Left results are compared to United Left of the Community of Madrid–The Greens totals in the 2015 election.; ^{2} With You for Las Rozas–Yes We Can–Act–The Greens results are compared to Yes We Can Las Rozas and Las Matas totals in the 2015 election.

=== Leganés ===
Population: 188,425

← Summary of the 26 May 2019 City Council of Leganés election results →
Parties and alliances	Popular vote			Seats	
Parties and alliances	Votes	%	±pp	Total	+/−
Spanish Socialist Workers' Party (PSOE)	30,178	32.31	+10.57	10	+4
Union for Leganés (ULEG)	14,577	15.61	−4.81	4	−2
People's Party (PP)	14,362	15.38	−4.64	4	−2
United We Can–United Left (Podemos–IU)^{1}	10,403	11.14	+5.81	3	+2
Citizens–Party of the Citizenry (Cs)	9,754	10.44	+2.47	3	+1
More Madrid–Leganemos (Más Madrid–Leganemos)^{2}	6,853	7.34	−13.80	2	−4
Vox (Vox)	5,672	6.07	+5.50	1	+1
The Left Today (LIH)	811	0.87	New	0	±0
Actual Equality (IGRE)	98	0.10	New	0	±0
Centre Unity (UdeC)	94	0.10	−0.03	0	±0
Blank ballots	586	0.63	−0.45		
Total	93,388			27	±0
Valid votes	93,388	99.43	+0.57		
Invalid votes	531	0.57	−0.57		
Votes cast / turnout	93,919	66.39	−2.81		
Abstentions	47,540	33.61	+2.81		
Registered voters	141,459				
Sources
Footnotes: ^{1} United We Can–United Left results are compared to United Left of the Community of Madrid–The Greens totals in the 2015 election.; ^{2} More Madrid–Leganemos results are compared to Leganemos totals in the 2015 election.

=== Madrid ===
Population: 3,223,334

=== Móstoles ===
Population: 207,095

← Summary of the 26 May 2019 City Council of Móstoles election results →
Parties and alliances	Popular vote			Seats	
Parties and alliances	Votes	%	±pp	Total	+/−
Spanish Socialist Workers' Party (PSOE)	32,579	33.63	+10.50	10	+3
People's Party (PP)	20,149	20.80	−15.52	6	−6
Citizens–Party of the Citizenry (Cs)	16,466	17.00	+17.00	5	+5
More Madrid–Winning Móstoles (MMGM)^{1}	8,125	8.39	−11.53	2	−4
Vox (Vox)	7,379	7.62	New	2	+2
We Can (Podemos)	7,126	7.36	New	2	+2
United Left–Stand Up Madrid (IU–MeP)^{2}	1,486	1.53	−4.48	0	−2
The Left Today–The Greens (LIH–GMLV)	1,449	1.50	New	0	±0
Let's Win (Ganemos)	451	0.47	−4.46	0	±0
Mostolenian Socialism (SOMOS)	397	0.41	−0.46	0	±0
United Móstoles (UDMS)	379	0.39	New	0	±0
Union of Independent Citizens (UCIN)	217	0.22	New	0	±0
Blank ballots	678	0.70	−1.14		
Total	96,881			27	±0
Valid votes	96,881	99.46	+0.91		
Invalid votes	522	0.54	−0.91		
Votes cast / turnout	97,403	62.32	−2.65		
Abstentions	58,884	37.68	+2.65		
Registered voters	156,287				
Sources
Footnotes: ^{1} More Madrid–Winning Móstoles results are compared to Winning Móstoles totals in the 2015 election.; ^{2} United Left–Stand Up Madrid results are compared to United Left of the Community of Madrid–The Greens totals in the 2015 election.

=== Parla ===
Population: 128,256

← Summary of the 26 May 2019 City Council of Parla election results →
Parties and alliances	Popular vote			Seats	
Parties and alliances	Votes	%	±pp	Total	+/−
Spanish Socialist Workers' Party (PSOE)	13,148	28.92	+12.85	9	+4
People's Party (PP)	8,555	18.82	−4.42	5	−2
United We Can–United Left–Another Parla is Possible (Podemos–IU)^{1}	6,740	14.83	−13.39	4	−5
Citizens–Party of the Citizenry (Cs)	5,996	13.19	New	4	+4
Vox (Vox)	4,754	10.46	+8.92	3	+3
Parla Network Neighbourhood Organizational Movement (MOVER Parla)	2,992	6.58	−12.82	2	−4
More Madrid–Parla (MMP)	2,222	4.89	New	0	±0
Act–The Left Today–The Greens (PACT–LIH–GMLV)	750	1.65	New	0	±0
Blank ballots	299	0.66	−1.28		
Total	45,456			27	±0
Valid votes	45,456	99.34	+1.17		
Invalid votes	300	0.66	−1.17		
Votes cast / turnout	45,756	57.87	−4.51		
Abstentions	33,314	42.13	+4.51		
Registered voters	79,070				
Sources
Footnotes: ^{1} United We Can–United Left–Another Parla is Possible results are compared to the combined totals of Let's Change Parla and United Left of the Community of Madrid–The Greens in the 2015 election.

=== Pozuelo de Alarcón ===
Population: 86,172

← Summary of the 26 May 2019 City Council of Pozuelo de Alarcón election results →
Parties and alliances	Popular vote			Seats	
Parties and alliances	Votes	%	±pp	Total	+/−
People's Party (PP)	18,935	40.29	−5.47	11	−3
Citizens–Party of the Citizenry (Cs)	9,146	19.46	−0.04	5	±0
Spanish Socialist Workers' Party (PSOE)	7,528	16.02	+4.54	4	+1
Vox (Vox)	6,483	13.79	+9.49	4	+4
We Are Pozuelo–More Madrid–United Left–Equo (SPoz–Más Madrid–IU–Equo)^{1}	3,205	6.82	−6.80	1	−2
Neighbours for Pozuelo de Alarcón (VporP)	1,260	2.68	New	0	±0
Act–The Left Today–The Greens (PACT–LIH–GMLV)	168	0.36	New	0	±0
Blank ballots	274	0.58	−0.87		
Total	46,999			25	±0
Valid votes	46,999	99.69	+0.53		
Invalid votes	144	0.31	−0.53		
Votes cast / turnout	47,143	74.87	+2.47		
Abstentions	15,820	25.13	−2.47		
Registered voters	62,963				
Sources
Footnotes: ^{1} We Are Pozuelo–More Madrid–United Left–Equo results are compared to the combined totals of We Are Pozuelo and United Left–Let's Win–The Greens in the 2015 election.

=== Rivas-Vaciamadrid ===
Population: 85,893

← Summary of the 26 May 2019 City Council of Rivas-Vaciamadrid election results →
Parties and alliances	Popular vote			Seats	
Parties and alliances	Votes	%	±pp	Total	+/−
United Left–Equo–More Madrid (IU Rivas–Equo–Más Madrid)	11,622	26.22	+1.75	7	±0
Spanish Socialist Workers' Party (PSOE)	10,298	23.23	+9.85	7	+3
Citizens–Party of the Citizenry (Cs)	7,694	17.36	+3.92	5	+1
People's Party (PP)	4,032	9.10	−7.10	2	−2
We Can (Podemos)	3,763	8.49	New	2	+2
Vox (Vox)	3,068	6.92	New	2	+2
Rivas Can (Rivas Puede)	1,820	4.11	−19.20	0	−6
Act (PACT)	832	1.88	New	0	±0
Neighbours for Rivas-Vaciamadrid (VxR)	825	1.86	New	0	±0
With You, We Are Democracy (Contigo)	111	0.25	New	0	±0
Blank ballots	258	0.58	−1.12		
Total	44,323			25	±0
Valid votes	44,323	99.62	+0.91		
Invalid votes	171	0.38	−0.91		
Votes cast / turnout	44,494	71.72	−1.43		
Abstentions	17,541	28.28	+1.43		
Registered voters	62,035				

=== San Sebastián de los Reyes ===
Population: 87,724

← Summary of the 26 May 2019 City Council of San Sebastián de los Reyes election results →
Parties and alliances	Popular vote			Seats	
Parties and alliances	Votes	%	±pp	Total	+/−
Spanish Socialist Workers' Party (PSOE)	10,917	25.68	+8.67	7	+2
People's Party (PP)	10,112	23.78	−5.63	7	−1
Citizens–Party of the Citizenry (Cs)	7,864	18.50	+6.15	5	+2
Independent Left–Initiative for San Sebastián de los Reyes (II–ISSR)	4,250	10.00	−5.87	2	−2
Vox (Vox)	3,163	7.44	New	2	±0
More Madrid–United Left–Equo Sanse (Más Madrid–IU–Equo)^{1}	2,267	5.33	−4.67	1	−2
We Can (Podemos)^{2}	2,147	5.05	−3.70	1	−1
Together for Sanse (JUSS)	709	1.67	New	0	±0
Sanse Yes We Can Assembly (AS.Sep)	472	1.11	New	0	±0
Spain 2000 (E–2000)	156	0.37	New	0	±0
Humanist Party (PH)	82	0.19	New	0	±0
Blank ballots	380	0.89	−0.72		
Total	42,519			25	±0
Valid votes	42,519	99.44	+0.55		
Invalid votes	238	0.56	−0.55		
Votes cast / turnout	42,757	66.49	+0.71		
Abstentions	21,553	33.51	−0.71		
Registered voters	64,310				
Sources
Footnotes: ^{1} More Madrid–United Left–Equo Sanse results are compared to Let's Win Sanse totals in the 2015 election.; ^{2} We Can results are compared to Yes We Can, Citizens' Alternative for Madrid totals in the 2015 election.

=== Torrejón de Ardoz ===
Population: 129,729

← Summary of the 26 May 2019 City Council of Torrejón de Ardoz election results →
Parties and alliances	Popular vote			Seats	
Parties and alliances	Votes	%	±pp	Total	+/−
People's Party (PP)	34,539	57.54	+8.69	19	+5
Spanish Socialist Workers' Party (PSOE)	12,192	20.31	+5.29	6	+2
We Can (Podemos)^{1}	4,027	6.71	−9.59	2	−3
Citizens–Party of the Citizenry (Cs)	2,752	4.58	−2.66	0	−2
United Left–Stand Up Madrid (IU–MeP)^{2}	2,550	4.25	−2.76	0	−2
Neighbours for Torrejón–More Madrid–Equo (VpT–Más Madrid–Equo)	1,614	2.69	New	0	±0
Vox (Vox)	1,454	2.42	New	0	±0
Act–The Left Today–The Greens (PACT–LIH–GMLV)	218	0.36	New	0	±0
Union, Progress and Democracy (UPyD)	131	0.22	−2.19	0	±0
The Centre (C)	60	0.10	New	0	±0
Blank ballots	489	0.81	−0.70		
Total	60,026			27	±0
Valid votes	60,026	99.59	+0.73		
Invalid votes	245	0.41	−0.73		
Votes cast / turnout	60,271	64.32	−1.58		
Abstentions	33,427	35.68	+1.58		
Registered voters	93,698				
Sources
Footnotes: ^{1} We Can results are compared to Yes We Can, Citizens' Alternative for Madrid totals in the 2015 election.; ^{2} United Left–Stand Up Madrid results are compared to Winning Torrejón totals in the 2015 election.

== See also ==
- 2019 Madrilenian regional election
