= 2015 Spanish local elections in the Community of Madrid =

This article presents the results breakdown of the local elections held in the Community of Madrid on 24 May 2015. The following tables show detailed results in the autonomous community's most populous municipalities, sorted alphabetically.

== City control ==
The following table lists party control in the most populous municipalities, including provincial capitals (shown in bold). Gains for a party are displayed with the cell's background shaded in that party's colour.

| Municipality | Population | Previous control | New control |
|---|---|---|---|
| Alcalá de Henares | 200,768 | People's Party (PP) | Spanish Socialist Workers' Party (PSOE) |
| Alcobendas | 112,188 | People's Party (PP) | People's Party (PP) |
| Alcorcón | 170,336 | People's Party (PP) | People's Party (PP) |
| Coslada | 88,847 | People's Party (PP) | Spanish Socialist Workers' Party (PSOE) |
| Fuenlabrada | 195,864 | Spanish Socialist Workers' Party (PSOE) | Spanish Socialist Workers' Party (PSOE) |
| Getafe | 173,057 | People's Party (PP) | Spanish Socialist Workers' Party (PSOE) |
| Las Rozas de Madrid | 92,784 | People's Party (PP) | People's Party (PP) |
| Leganés | 186,696 | People's Party (PP) | Spanish Socialist Workers' Party (PSOE) |
| **Madrid** | 3,165,235 | People's Party (PP) | Madrid Now (Ahora Madrid) |
| Móstoles | 205,712 | People's Party (PP) | Spanish Socialist Workers' Party (PSOE) |
| Parla | 125,323 | Spanish Socialist Workers' Party (PSOE) | People's Party (PP) |
| Pozuelo de Alarcón | 84,360 | People's Party (PP) | People's Party (PP) |
| Rivas-Vaciamadrid | 80,483 | United Left (IU) | United Left (IU) |
| San Sebastián de los Reyes | 83,329 | People's Party (PP) | Spanish Socialist Workers' Party (PSOE) |
| Torrejón de Ardoz | 126,878 | People's Party (PP) | People's Party (PP) |

== Municipalities ==
=== Alcalá de Henares ===
Population: 200,768

← Summary of the 24 May 2015 City Council of Alcalá de Henares election results →
| Parties and alliances | Popular vote | | | Seats | |
| Parties and alliances | Votes | % | ±pp | Total | +/− |
|---|---|---|---|---|---|
| People's Party (PP) | 21,588 | 24.08 | −16.59 | 8 | −4 |
| Spanish Socialist Workers' Party (PSOE) | 21,370 | 23.84 | −8.04 | 7 | −2 |
| We Are Alcalá (Somos Alcalá) | 18,350 | 20.47 | New | 6 | +6 |
| Citizens–Party of the Citizenry (C's) | 12,139 | 13.54 | New | 4 | +4 |
| Spain 2000 (E–2000) | 5,214 | 5.82 | +0.64 | 1 | ±0 |
| United Left of the Community of Madrid–The Greens (IUCM–LV) | 4,735 | 5.28 | −4.43 | 1 | −2 |
| Union, Progress and Democracy (UPyD) | 2,640 | 2.95 | −4.17 | 0 | −2 |
| The Greens of the Community of Madrid (LVCM)^{1} | 973 | 1.09 | −0.45 | 0 | ±0 |
| Citizens of Democratic Centre (CCD) | 545 | 0.61 | New | 0 | ±0 |
| Vox (Vox) | 491 | 0.55 | New | 0 | ±0 |
| Humanist Party (PH) | 147 | 0.16 | −0.07 | 0 | ±0 |
| Liberal Platform of New Attitudes (PLAN) | 144 | 0.16 | New | 0 | ±0 |
| Castilian Party–Commoners' Land: Pact (PCAS–TC–Pacto) | 103 | 0.11 | ±0.00 | 0 | ±0 |
| Blank ballots | 1,201 | 1.34 | −0.97 | | |
| Total | 89,640 | | | 27 | ±0 |
| Valid votes | 89,640 | 98.84 | +0.32 | | |
| Invalid votes | 1,048 | 1.16 | −0.32 | | |
| Votes cast / turnout | 90,688 | 66.02 | +0.25 | | |
| Abstentions | 46,684 | 33.98 | −0.25 | | |
| Registered voters | 137,372 | | | | |
Sources
Footnotes: ^{1} The Greens of the Community of Madrid results are compared to Ecolo–Greens totals in the 2011 election.

=== Alcobendas ===
Population: 112,188

← Summary of the 24 May 2015 City Council of Alcobendas election results →
| Parties and alliances | Popular vote | | | Seats | |
| Parties and alliances | Votes | % | ±pp | Total | +/− |
|---|---|---|---|---|---|
| People's Party (PP) | 20,317 | 38.46 | −11.22 | 12 | −3 |
| Spanish Socialist Workers' Party (PSOE) | 11,572 | 21.90 | +2.81 | 7 | +2 |
| Citizens–Party of the Citizenry (C's) | 6,194 | 11.72 | New | 3 | +3 |
| Yes We Can, Citizens' Alternative for Madrid (SSPACxM) | 5,497 | 10.40 | New | 3 | +3 |
| Union, Progress and Democracy (UPyD) | 3,082 | 5.83 | −13.33 | 1 | −4 |
| United Left of the Community of Madrid–The Greens (IUCM–LV) | 2,665 | 5.04 | −1.73 | 1 | −1 |
| Let's Win (Ganemos) | 1,890 | 3.58 | New | 0 | ±0 |
| Vox (Vox) | 631 | 1.19 | New | 0 | ±0 |
| Humanist Party (PH) | 183 | 0.35 | −0.10 | 0 | ±0 |
| Blank ballots | 802 | 1.52 | −0.65 | | |
| Total | 52,833 | | | 27 | ±0 |
| Valid votes | 52,833 | 98.94 | +0.32 | | |
| Invalid votes | 568 | 1.06 | −0.32 | | |
| Votes cast / turnout | 53,401 | 67.53 | −1.12 | | |
| Abstentions | 25,676 | 32.47 | +1.12 | | |
| Registered voters | 79,077 | | | | |

=== Alcorcón ===
Population: 170,336

← Summary of the 24 May 2015 City Council of Alcorcón election results →
| Parties and alliances | Popular vote | | | Seats | |
| Parties and alliances | Votes | % | ±pp | Total | +/− |
|---|---|---|---|---|---|
| People's Party (PP) | 26,955 | 31.12 | −17.32 | 10 | −5 |
| Spanish Socialist Workers' Party (PSOE) | 21,051 | 24.30 | −7.11 | 7 | −2 |
| Winning Alcorcón (Ganar Alcorcón) | 15,060 | 17.38 | New | 5 | +5 |
| Citizens–Party of the Citizenry (C's) | 11,005 | 12.70 | New | 4 | +4 |
| United Left of the Community of Madrid–The Greens (IUCM–LV) | 5,130 | 5.92 | −2.92 | 1 | −1 |
| Union, Progress and Democracy (UPyD) | 3,464 | 4.00 | −1.94 | 0 | −1 |
| The Greens–Green Group (LV–GV) | 2,639 | 3.05 | New | 0 | ±0 |
| Castilian Party–Commoners' Land: Pact (PCAS–TC–Pacto) | 190 | 0.22 | New | 0 | ±0 |
| Blank ballots | 1,135 | 1.31 | −0.88 | | |
| Total | 86,629 | | | 27 | ±0 |
| Valid votes | 86,629 | 98.79 | +0.30 | | |
| Invalid votes | 1,062 | 1.21 | −0.30 | | |
| Votes cast / turnout | 87,691 | 70.09 | +0.10 | | |
| Abstentions | 37,415 | 29.91 | −0.10 | | |
| Registered voters | 125,106 | | | | |

=== Coslada ===
Population: 88,847

← Summary of the 24 May 2015 City Council of Coslada election results →
| Parties and alliances | Popular vote | | | Seats | |
| Parties and alliances | Votes | % | ±pp | Total | +/− |
|---|---|---|---|---|---|
| People's Party (PP) | 10,296 | 24.93 | −14.47 | 7 | −4 |
| Spanish Socialist Workers' Party (PSOE) | 9,505 | 23.01 | −4.30 | 6 | −2 |
| We Are Coslada (SmC) | 8,009 | 19.39 | New | 5 | +5 |
| Citizens–Party of the Citizenry (C's) | 4,603 | 11.14 | New | 3 | +3 |
| United Left of the Community of Madrid–The Greens (IUCM–LV) | 4,354 | 10.54 | −2.70 | 3 | ±0 |
| Republican Group of Coslada (ARCO) | 2,187 | 5.30 | −0.47 | 1 | ±0 |
| Union, Progress and Democracy (UPyD) | 1,285 | 3.11 | −4.80 | 0 | −2 |
| Centre Citizens (CdelC) | 389 | 0.94 | New | 0 | ±0 |
| Blank ballots | 675 | 1.63 | −1.47 | | |
| Total | 41,303 | | | 25 | ±0 |
| Valid votes | 41,303 | 98.53 | +0.64 | | |
| Invalid votes | 618 | 1.47 | −0.64 | | |
| Votes cast / turnout | 41,921 | 69.65 | +1.47 | | |
| Abstentions | 18,271 | 30.35 | −1.47 | | |
| Registered voters | 60,192 | | | | |

=== Fuenlabrada ===
Population: 195,864

← Summary of the 24 May 2015 City Council of Fuenlabrada election results →
| Parties and alliances | Popular vote | | | Seats | |
| Parties and alliances | Votes | % | ±pp | Total | +/− |
|---|---|---|---|---|---|
| Spanish Socialist Workers' Party (PSOE) | 40,529 | 45.24 | +4.16 | 13 | +1 |
| People's Party (PP) | 15,165 | 16.93 | −21.46 | 5 | −6 |
| Winning Fuenlabrada (GF) | 13,001 | 14.51 | New | 4 | +4 |
| Citizens–Party of the Citizenry (C's) | 11,754 | 13.12 | New | 4 | +4 |
| United Left of the Community of Madrid–The Greens (IUCM–LV) | 5,065 | 5.65 | −5.05 | 1 | −2 |
| Union, Progress and Democracy (UPyD) | 2,218 | 2.48 | −3.26 | 0 | −1 |
| Vox (Vox) | 766 | 0.86 | New | 0 | ±0 |
| Blank ballots | 1,086 | 1.21 | −1.38 | | |
| Total | 89,584 | | | 27 | ±0 |
| Valid votes | 89,584 | 98.81 | +0.44 | | |
| Invalid votes | 1,083 | 1.19 | −0.44 | | |
| Votes cast / turnout | 90,667 | 64.86 | +1.52 | | |
| Abstentions | 49,127 | 35.14 | −1.52 | | |
| Registered voters | 139,794 | | | | |

=== Getafe ===
Population: 173,057

← Summary of the 24 May 2015 City Council of Getafe election results →
| Parties and alliances | Popular vote | | | Seats | |
| Parties and alliances | Votes | % | ±pp | Total | +/− |
|---|---|---|---|---|---|
| People's Party (PP) | 24,986 | 28.57 | −12.78 | 9 | −3 |
| Spanish Socialist Workers' Party (PSOE) | 23,880 | 27.30 | −4.57 | 8 | −1 |
| Getafe Now (Ahora Getafe) | 20,648 | 23.61 | New | 7 | +7 |
| Citizens–Party of the Citizenry (C's) | 7,082 | 8.10 | New | 2 | +2 |
| United Left of the Community of Madrid–The Greens (IUCM–LV) | 4,994 | 5.71 | −8.00 | 1 | −3 |
| Union, Progress and Democracy (UPyD) | 2,622 | 3.00 | −3.45 | 0 | −2 |
| Alternatives from Below Getafe (AdA Getafe) | 933 | 1.07 | New | 0 | ±0 |
| Vox (Vox) | 587 | 0.67 | New | 0 | ±0 |
| For Them (A Por Ellos) | 577 | 0.66 | New | 0 | ±0 |
| Centre Unity (UdeC) | 97 | 0.11 | New | 0 | ±0 |
| Blank ballots | 1,055 | 1.21 | −1.15 | | |
| Total | 87,461 | | | 27 | ±0 |
| Valid votes | 87,461 | 98.92 | +0.77 | | |
| Invalid votes | 959 | 1.08 | −0.77 | | |
| Votes cast / turnout | 88,420 | 69.97 | −0.93 | | |
| Abstentions | 37,943 | 30.03 | +0.93 | | |
| Registered voters | 126,363 | | | | |

=== Las Rozas de Madrid ===
Population: 92,784

← Summary of the 24 May 2015 City Council of Las Rozas de Madrid election results →
| Parties and alliances | Popular vote | | | Seats | |
| Parties and alliances | Votes | % | ±pp | Total | +/− |
|---|---|---|---|---|---|
| People's Party (PP) | 17,168 | 38.03 | −19.69 | 11 | −5 |
| Citizens–Party of the Citizenry (C's) | 9,344 | 20.70 | New | 6 | +6 |
| With You for Las Rozas (CPLR)^{1} | 5,286 | 11.71 | +4.20 | 3 | +1 |
| Spanish Socialist Workers' Party (PSOE) | 4,985 | 11.04 | −4.02 | 3 | −1 |
| Union, Progress and Democracy (UPyD) | 2,952 | 6.54 | −6.21 | 2 | −1 |
| Yes We Can Las Rozas and Las Matas (SSP Las Rozas y Las Matas) | 1,853 | 4.10 | New | 0 | ±0 |
| Vox (Vox) | 1,558 | 3.45 | New | 0 | ±0 |
| True Change Las Rozas (CVLR) | 649 | 1.44 | −2.27 | 0 | ±0 |
| Union of Independent Citizens (UCIN) | 479 | 1.06 | New | 0 | ±0 |
| Blank ballots | 872 | 1.93 | −1.32 | | |
| Total | 45,146 | | | 25 | ±0 |
| Valid votes | 45,146 | 99.22 | +0.68 | | |
| Invalid votes | 354 | 0.78 | −0.68 | | |
| Votes cast / turnout | 45,500 | 70.18 | −0.75 | | |
| Abstentions | 19,332 | 29.82 | +0.75 | | |
| Registered voters | 64,832 | | | | |
Sources
Footnotes: ^{1} With You for Las Rozas results are compared to United Left of the Community of Madrid–The Greens totals in the 2011 election.

=== Leganés ===
Population: 186,696

← Summary of the 24 May 2015 City Council of Leganés election results →
| Parties and alliances | Popular vote | | | Seats | |
| Parties and alliances | Votes | % | ±pp | Total | +/− |
|---|---|---|---|---|---|
| Spanish Socialist Workers' Party (PSOE) | 20,726 | 21.74 | −5.98 | 6 | −2 |
| Leganemos (Leganemos) | 20,148 | 21.14 | New | 6 | +6 |
| Union for Leganés (ULEG) | 19,463 | 20.42 | +7.14 | 6 | +2 |
| People's Party (PP) | 19,083 | 20.02 | −20.06 | 6 | −6 |
| Citizens–Party of the Citizenry (C's) | 7,556 | 7.93 | New | 2 | +2 |
| United Left of the Community of Madrid–The Greens (IUCM–LV) | 5,079 | 5.33 | −6.15 | 1 | −2 |
| Union, Progress and Democracy (UPyD) | 1,567 | 1.64 | −2.36 | 0 | ±0 |
| Vox (Vox) | 544 | 0.57 | New | 0 | ±0 |
| Centre Unity (UdeC) | 128 | 0.13 | New | 0 | ±0 |
| Blank ballots | 1,034 | 1.08 | −1.10 | | |
| Total | 95,328 | | | 27 | ±0 |
| Valid votes | 95,328 | 98.86 | +0.53 | | |
| Invalid votes | 1,101 | 1.14 | −0.53 | | |
| Votes cast / turnout | 96,429 | 69.20 | +0.15 | | |
| Abstentions | 42,928 | 30.80 | −0.15 | | |
| Registered voters | 139,357 | | | | |

=== Madrid ===
Population: 3,165,235

=== Móstoles ===
Population: 205,712

← Summary of the 24 May 2015 City Council of Móstoles election results →
| Parties and alliances | Popular vote | | | Seats | |
| Parties and alliances | Votes | % | ±pp | Total | +/− |
|---|---|---|---|---|---|
| People's Party (PP) | 35,904 | 36.32 | −19.60 | 12 | −5 |
| Spanish Socialist Workers' Party (PSOE) | 22,867 | 23.13 | −1.54 | 7 | ±0 |
| Winning Móstoles (GMost) | 19,690 | 19.92 | New | 6 | +6 |
| United Left of the Community of Madrid–The Greens (IUCM–LV) | 5,945 | 6.01 | −3.68 | 2 | −1 |
| Let's Win (Ganemos) | 4,877 | 4.93 | New | 0 | ±0 |
| Union, Progress and Democracy (UPyD) | 4,161 | 4.21 | −0.26 | 0 | ±0 |
| Third Way (3VIA) | 2,316 | 2.34 | New | 0 | ±0 |
| Mostolenian Socialism (SOMOS) | 860 | 0.87 | +0.06 | 0 | ±0 |
| Libertarian Party (P–LIB) | 216 | 0.22 | New | 0 | ±0 |
| Castilian Party–Commoners' Land: Pact (PCAS–TC–Pacto) | 191 | 0.19 | New | 0 | ±0 |
| Citizens–Party of the Citizenry (C's) | 0 | 0.00 | New | 0 | ±0 |
| Blank ballots | 1,820 | 1.84 | −0.64 | | |
| Total | 98,847 | | | 27 | ±0 |
| Valid votes | 98,847 | 98.55 | +0.15 | | |
| Invalid votes | 1,452 | 1.45 | −0.15 | | |
| Votes cast / turnout | 100,299 | 64.97 | +0.45 | | |
| Abstentions | 54,069 | 35.03 | −0.45 | | |
| Registered voters | 154,368 | | | | |

=== Parla ===
Population: 125,323

← Summary of the 24 May 2015 City Council of Parla election results →
| Parties and alliances | Popular vote | | | Seats | |
| Parties and alliances | Votes | % | ±pp | Total | +/− |
|---|---|---|---|---|---|
| People's Party (PP) | 10,935 | 23.24 | −13.85 | 7 | −4 |
| Parla Network Neighbourhood Organizational Movement (MOVER Parla) | 9,131 | 19.40 | New | 6 | +6 |
| Let's Change Parla (Cambiemos Parla) | 8,746 | 18.59 | New | 6 | +6 |
| Spanish Socialist Workers' Party (PSOE) | 7,560 | 16.07 | −21.07 | 5 | −6 |
| United Left of the Community of Madrid–The Greens (IUCM–LV) | 4,531 | 9.63 | −4.71 | 3 | −1 |
| Union, Progress and Democracy (UPyD) | 2,277 | 4.84 | −0.68 | 0 | −1 |
| Party for Freedom–With Clean Hands (PxL) | 2,243 | 4.77 | New | 0 | ±0 |
| Vox (Vox) | 723 | 1.54 | New | 0 | ±0 |
| Blank ballots | 911 | 1.94 | −0.66 | | |
| Total | 47,057 | | | 27 | ±0 |
| Valid votes | 47,057 | 98.17 | −0.18 | | |
| Invalid votes | 878 | 1.83 | +0.18 | | |
| Votes cast / turnout | 47,935 | 62.38 | −2.58 | | |
| Abstentions | 28,912 | 37.62 | +2.58 | | |
| Registered voters | 76,847 | | | | |

=== Pozuelo de Alarcón ===
Population: 84,360

← Summary of the 24 May 2015 City Council of Pozuelo de Alarcón election results →
| Parties and alliances | Popular vote | | | Seats | |
| Parties and alliances | Votes | % | ±pp | Total | +/− |
|---|---|---|---|---|---|
| People's Party (PP) | 20,063 | 45.76 | −15.58 | 14 | −3 |
| Citizens–Party of the Citizenry (C's) | 8,548 | 19.50 | +18.57 | 5 | +5 |
| Spanish Socialist Workers' Party (PSOE) | 5,032 | 11.48 | −4.66 | 3 | −1 |
| We Are Pozuelo (SPoz) | 4,911 | 11.20 | New | 3 | +3 |
| Vox (Vox) | 1,884 | 4.30 | New | 0 | ±0 |
| Union, Progress and Democracy (UPyD) | 1,428 | 3.26 | −7.69 | 0 | −3 |
| United Left–Let's Win–The Greens (IUCM–LV–Ganemos) | 1,062 | 2.42 | −2.62 | 0 | −1 |
| United Free Citizens (CILUS) | 173 | 0.39 | New | 0 | ±0 |
| Spain on the Move (LEM) | 108 | 0.25 | New | 0 | ±0 |
| Blank ballots | 637 | 1.45 | −2.01 | | |
| Total | 43,846 | | | 25 | ±0 |
| Valid votes | 43,846 | 99.16 | +0.72 | | |
| Invalid votes | 372 | 0.84 | −0.72 | | |
| Votes cast / turnout | 44,218 | 72.40 | −0.02 | | |
| Abstentions | 16,857 | 27.60 | +0.02 | | |
| Registered voters | 61,075 | | | | |

=== Rivas-Vaciamadrid ===
Population: 80,483

← Summary of the 24 May 2015 City Council of Rivas-Vaciamadrid election results →
| Parties and alliances | Popular vote | | | Seats | |
| Parties and alliances | Votes | % | ±pp | Total | +/− |
|---|---|---|---|---|---|
| United Left–Equo–We Are Rivas (IU–Equo–Somos Rivas) | 9,988 | 24.47 | −20.87 | 7 | −6 |
| Rivas Can (Rivas Puede) | 9,513 | 23.31 | New | 6 | +6 |
| People's Party (PP) | 6,612 | 16.20 | −10.51 | 4 | −3 |
| Citizens–Party of the Citizenry (C's) | 5,484 | 13.44 | New | 4 | +4 |
| Spanish Socialist Workers' Party (PSOE) | 5,462 | 13.38 | −0.39 | 4 | ±0 |
| Citizens of Rivas (CDR) | 1,675 | 4.10 | −2.48 | 0 | −1 |
| Union, Progress and Democracy (UPyD) | 666 | 1.63 | −2.22 | 0 | ±0 |
| Independent Neighbourhood Association of Rivas-Vaciamadrid (AVIVA) | 525 | 1.29 | New | 0 | ±0 |
| Citizens' Democratic Renewal Movement (RED) | 193 | 0.47 | New | 0 | ±0 |
| Blank ballots | 692 | 1.70 | −0.86 | | |
| Total | 40,810 | | | 25 | ±0 |
| Valid votes | 40,810 | 98.71 | +0.40 | | |
| Invalid votes | 535 | 1.29 | −0.40 | | |
| Votes cast / turnout | 41,345 | 73.15 | +2.45 | | |
| Abstentions | 15,178 | 26.85 | −2.45 | | |
| Registered voters | 56,523 | | | | |

=== San Sebastián de los Reyes ===
Population: 83,329

← Summary of the 24 May 2015 City Council of San Sebastián de los Reyes election results →
| Parties and alliances | Popular vote | | | Seats | |
| Parties and alliances | Votes | % | ±pp | Total | +/− |
|---|---|---|---|---|---|
| People's Party (PP) | 11,616 | 29.41 | −20.12 | 8 | −6 |
| Spanish Socialist Workers' Party (PSOE) | 6,719 | 17.01 | −2.19 | 5 | ±0 |
| Independent Left–Initiative for San Sebastián de los Reyes (II–ISSR) | 6,270 | 15.87 | −0.97 | 4 | −1 |
| Citizens–Party of the Citizenry (C's) | 4,879 | 12.35 | New | 3 | +3 |
| Let's Win Sanse (GSS)^{1} | 3,949 | 10.00 | +3.76 | 3 | +2 |
| Yes We Can, Citizens' Alternative for Madrid (SSPACxM) | 3,458 | 8.75 | New | 2 | +2 |
| Union, Progress and Democracy (UPyD) | 979 | 2.48 | −2.35 | 0 | ±0 |
| Party for Freedom–With Clean Hands (PxL) | 841 | 2.13 | New | 0 | ±0 |
| Spanish Alternative (AES) | 153 | 0.39 | New | 0 | ±0 |
| Blank ballots | 637 | 1.61 | −0.96 | | |
| Total | 39,501 | | | 25 | ±0 |
| Valid votes | 39,501 | 98.89 | +0.23 | | |
| Invalid votes | 442 | 1.11 | −0.23 | | |
| Votes cast / turnout | 39,943 | 65.78 | −0.74 | | |
| Abstentions | 20,779 | 34.22 | +0.74 | | |
| Registered voters | 60,722 | | | | |
Sources
Footnotes: ^{1} Let's Win Sanse results are compared to United Left of the Community of Madrid–The Greens totals in the 2011 election.

=== Torrejón de Ardoz ===
Population: 126,878

← Summary of the 24 May 2015 City Council of Torrejón de Ardoz election results →
| Parties and alliances | Popular vote | | | Seats | |
| Parties and alliances | Votes | % | ±pp | Total | +/− |
|---|---|---|---|---|---|
| People's Party (PP) | 28,067 | 48.85 | −19.68 | 14 | −7 |
| Yes We Can, Citizens' Alternative for Madrid (SSPACxM) | 9,368 | 16.30 | New | 5 | +5 |
| Spanish Socialist Workers' Party (PSOE) | 8,632 | 15.02 | −0.37 | 4 | ±0 |
| Citizens–Party of the Citizenry (C's) | 4,160 | 7.24 | New | 2 | +2 |
| Winning Torrejón (GT (IU–Equo))^{1} | 4,027 | 7.01 | −2.26 | 2 | ±0 |
| Union, Progress and Democracy (UPyD) | 1,384 | 2.41 | −1.53 | 0 | ±0 |
| Party for Freedom–With Clean Hands (PxL) | 759 | 1.32 | New | 0 | ±0 |
| Citizens' Democratic Renewal Movement (RED) | 193 | 0.34 | New | 0 | ±0 |
| Blank ballots | 865 | 1.51 | −0.99 | | |
| Total | 57,455 | | | 27 | ±0 |
| Valid votes | 57,455 | 98.86 | +0.61 | | |
| Invalid votes | 661 | 1.14 | −0.61 | | |
| Votes cast / turnout | 58,116 | 65.90 | −1.11 | | |
| Abstentions | 30,072 | 34.10 | +1.11 | | |
| Registered voters | 88,188 | | | | |
Sources
Footnotes: ^{1} Winning Torrejón results are compared to United Left of the Community of Madrid–The Greens totals in the 2011 election.

== See also ==
- 2015 Madrilenian regional election
