= Juan López de Uralde =

Spanish politician (born 1963)

Juan López de Uralde MP
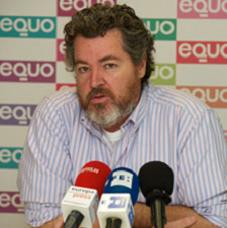

Member of the Congress of Deputies
- In office 13 January 2016 – 29 May 2023
- Constituency: Álava

Spokesperson of Greens Equo in the Congress of Deputies
- In office 30 June 2016 – 21 October 2018
- Preceded by: Position established
- Succeeded by: Inés Sabanés

Personal details
- Born: Juan Antonio López de Uralde Garmendia; 8 September 1963 (age 62) San Sebastián, Basque Country, Spain
- Party: Green Alliance (2021–present)
- Other political affiliations: Greens Equo (2011–2019)

Juan Antonio López de Uralde Garmendia (born 8 September 1963) is a Spanish politician interested in ecological issues. He was spokesperson of Greenpeace Spain from 2001 to 2010. He was first elected to the Spanish Congress in 2015.

He has represented Álava in Congress for Podemos since the 2015 Spanish general election, being re-elected in 2016 and 2019.

He is a member of the Green Alliance. He was previously a member of another green party, Equo, but left after it decided to break with the Podemos electoral coalition in the run up to the November 2019 Spanish general election.

Following a poor showing in the 2023 Spanish regional elections, doubts were expressed about the future of Podemos as an electoral coalition. The Green Alliance along with Greens Equo joined the Sumar electoral platform for the 2023 general election. In June an agreement was reached between Sumar and Podemos.
