= Florent Marcellesi =

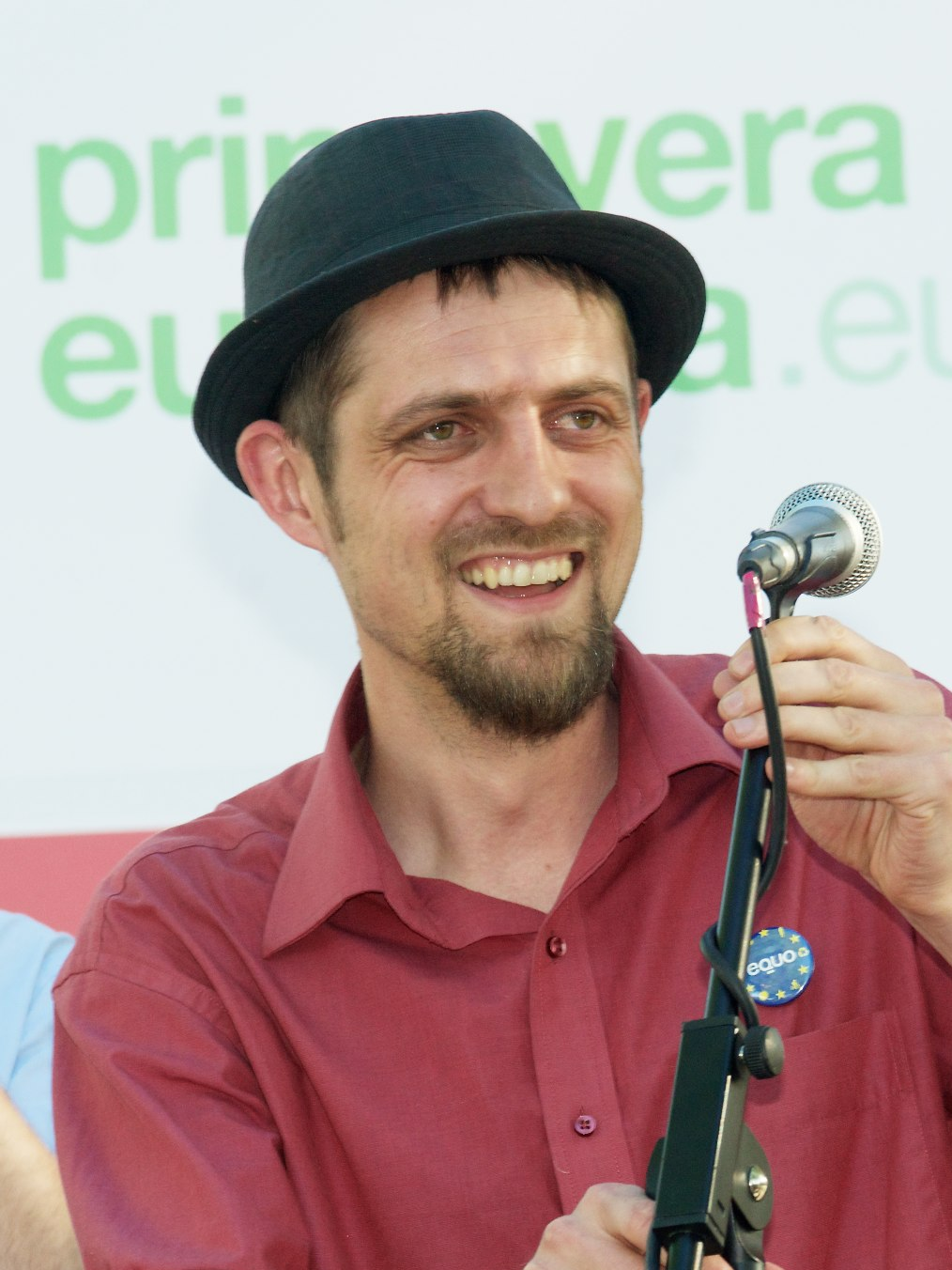

Member of the European Parliament
- In office 11 October 2016 – 1 July 2019
- Constituency: Spain

Personal details
- Born: 10 April 1979 (age 46); Angers, France
- Citizenship: French
- Political party: The Greens (2002–2004); Berdeak-Los Verdes (2004–2011); Equo (since 2011)
- Occupation: Activist, politician

Florent Marcellesi (born 1979) is a French politician and activist based in Spain. Federal Co-Spokesperson of Equo from 2020 to 2024, he previously served as Member of the European Parliament from 2016 to 2019.

== Biography ==
Born on 10 April 1979 in Angers, France, he is son to a Corsican father and a Polish mother. He studied road engineering in Lyon, and urbanism at Sciences Po in Paris as well as international cooperation at the University of the Basque Country.

Involved with the French Greens since 2002, Marcellesi, based in Bilbao since 2004, later joined Berdeak-Los Verdes, a Green party operating in the Basque Country, running as leading candidate of the latter's party in the 2007 Bilbao municipal election. He also promoted the "Platform for Decent Housing" as well as became a member of Desazkundea, a group advocating for degrowth positions.

One of the members of the foundational committee that created Equo in 2011, in March 2014 Marcellesi won the party primaries intended to determine the leading candidate for the upcoming May 2014 European Parliament election in Spain. Thus, he ran second in the Primavera Europea coalition list after Jordi Sebastià (from Compromís). He became a member of the European Parliament on 11 October 2016, following the early renouncement of Sebastià (already agreed as part of the 2014 coalition deal between Compromís and Equo).

Integrated within the Greens–European Free Alliance political group (Greens/EFA), Marcellesi served as member of the Committee on Agriculture and Rural Development, the Committee on Women's Rights and Gender Equality, the Delegation for relations with the Maghreb countries and the Arab Maghreb Union, and the Delegation to the Parliamentary Assembly of the Union for the Mediterranean.

Equo members elected Marcellesi as Federal Co-Spokesperson of the party along Inés Sabanés in February 2020.
