= CastroVerde (political party) =

CastroVerde CastroGreen
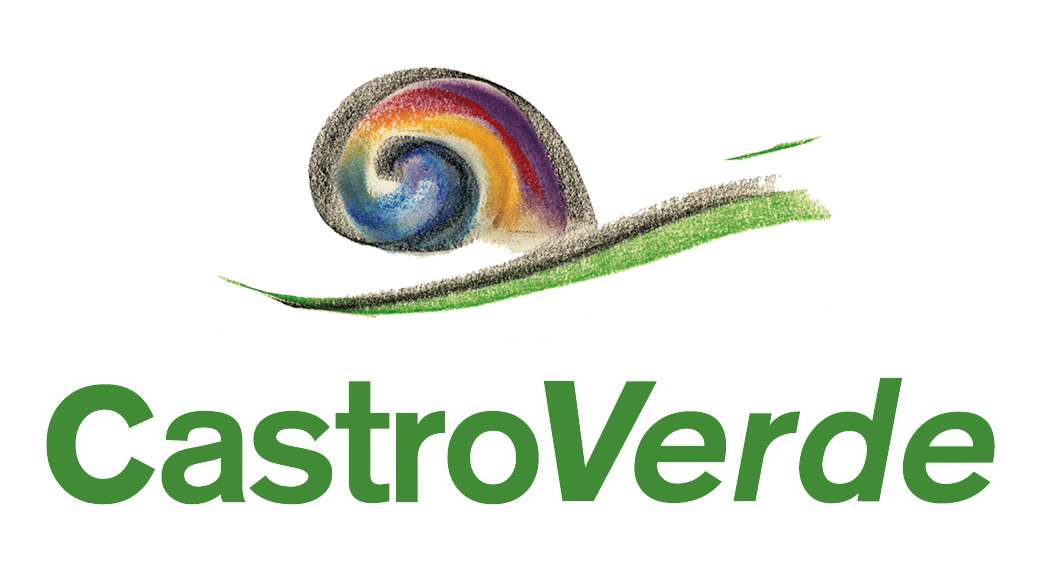
- President: Blas García
- Secretary-General: Aintzane Belmonte
- Founded: 17 february 2011
- Merger of: Another Castro is Possible; Plataforma para Salvar la Bahía; Plataforma para salvar la Peña de Santullán
- Headquarters: Castro Urdiales
- Ideology: Ecologism; Progressivism; Participative democracy
- Political position: Left-wing
- Colours: Green
- City Council of Castro Urdiales: 7 / 21

Website
- www.castrourdialesverde.com

CastroVerde (English: CastroGreen) is a green municipal political party in Castro Urdiales (Cantabria, Spain) created in 2011 by members of various local social movements and platforms. Among its members and founders are people linked to associations such as Another Castro is Possible, the Platform to Save the Bay or the Platform to save the Peña de Santullán.

== History ==
In its founding manifesto "Castro, I love you green", the party defends the need to "dignify political life" and "direct the municipality towards economic and environmental sustainability", based on "projects related to municipal organization, resource planning and urban planning, as well as the relationship with the Neighborhood Councils and the Government of Cantabria". Another of the priorities of CastroVerde is citizen participation, based on participation councils, popular consultation and voluntary work.

CastroVerde participated in the municipal elections on May 22, 2011. The list presented obtained 2,229 votes (15.84%) and four seats of the 21 that make up the City Council of Castro Urdiales. CastroVerde won the municipal elections of May 24, 2015, obtaining 7 city councilors and the mayor of Castro Urdiales. In 2017 CastroVerde broke the coalition with the local Socialist Party, since then the party has a minority government.
