= Green Alliance (Spain) =

Green Alliance Alianza Verde
- Abbreviation: AV
- Leader: Juan López de Uralde
- Founded: 10 June 2021
- Split from: Equo
- Headquarters: Madrid
- Ideology: Eco-socialism; Green politics Ecologism
- Political position: Left-wing
- National affiliation: Unidas Podemos (2021–2023); Sumar (2023)
- Colours: Green; Yellow
- Congress of Deputies: 0 / 350

Website
- alianzaverde.es

The Green Alliance (Spanish: Alianza Verde; AV) is a Spanish ecologist and eco-socialist political party, ideologically located to the left. It was created on 10 June 2021 within the Unidas Podemos electoral coalition. It has a representative in the Congress of Deputies, Juan López de Uralde, founder and former leader of Equo.

Since its inception, it has been presented to all elections alongside Podemos, either as part of Unidas Podemos, Sumar or in coalition with them.

== History ==
Alianza Verde was born from the people who stayed at Unidas Podemos after Equo left this space to join Más País in 2019, along with others from environmental social organizations. Although the initial intention was to launch this new party shortly after, that is, in 2020, the COVID-19 pandemic forced it to be paralyzed. It was presented on June 10, 2021 in Madrid by its federal coordinator, Juan López de Uralde, deputy and president of the Ecological Transition Commission in the Congress of Deputies, by the Andalusian coordinator Carmen Molina, former deputy of the Parliament of Andalusia, and by the coordinator of the País Valencià, the former Secretary of the Environment of the Generalitat Valenciana, Julià Álvaro. Along with them, the Executive Committee of Alianza Verde is made up, on an equal basis, by Carmen Tejero, a historical activist from Confederation of the Greens; Fernando Rodrigo, former president of ISTAS at CCOO; and by Beatriz del Hoyo, its communication manager.

The first election in which they participated was the 2022 Andalusian regional election, as part of Unidas Podemos. The Green Alliance along with Greens Equo joined the Sumar electoral platform for the 2023 general election.
