= Greens Equo =

Green Party Partido Verde
- Spokesperson: Mar González; José Ramón Becerra
- Founded: 4 June 2011 (as Equo)
- Preceded by: List: Fundación Equo; Berdeak-Los Verdes; CastroVerde; Ciudadanos por Altea (CIPAL); Coordinadora Verde; Coordinadora Verde de Andalucía; Coordinadora Verde de Madrid; Ecolo Córdoba; Verdes de Extremadura; Verdes de Navarra-Nafarroako Berdeak; Verdes de Paterna; Electores (Alhaurín de la Torre); Els Verds-Esquerra Ecologista; Els Verds de Menorca; Espacio Verde Andalucía Ecológica; Iniciativa Verds; Iniciativa del Poble Valencià; Iniciativa por Marbella y San Pedro (IMA+S); Los Verdes de Andalucía; Los Verdes de Asturias; Los Verdes de Canarias; Los Verdes de Europa; Los Verdes de Madrid; Los Verdes de Puerto Real; Partido Verde Canario; Plataforma Melilla Verde; Los Verdes de Aragón; Verdes de La Rioja; Verdes de Laciana; Los Verdes de la Región de Murcia; Verdes de Salamanca; Verdes de Segovia; Verdes de Villena
- Headquarters: Calle Jiloca, 4; 28016 Madrid
- Youth wing: Juventud Verde
- Membership (2019): 4,337
- Ideology: Green politics: Eco-socialism Ecofeminism
- Political position: Centre-left to left-wing
- National affiliation: Unidas Podemos (2016–2019); Sumar (since 2023); Broad Front (since 2026)
- European affiliation: European Green Party
- International affiliation: Global Greens
- Colors: Green; Yellow
- Congress of Deputies: 0 / 350
- Spanish Senate: 0 / 266
- European Parliament (Spanish seats): 0 / 61
- Local Government: 76 / 67,611
- Regional parliaments: 5 / 1,261

Website
- verdesequo.es

The Green Party is a green political party in Spain. The party was founded as Equo in 2011 and later renamed to Greens Equo. It was established on 4 June 2011 by the merger of 35 Spanish green parties. It began as a foundation on 24 September 2010 with the goal of becoming "the seed and source of debate about political ecology and social equity, originating a sociopolitical movement".

== History ==
The first election it contested was the 2011 Spanish general election, obtaining 216,748 votes (0.9%), making it the 9th most supported party. The party was fifth in Madrid, achieving representation thanks to the Valencian coalition Compromís-Q, in which Equo participated.

At the national elections of 20 December 2015, Equo joined the list of Podemos. This resulted in seats for three Equo candidates: Juantxo López de Uralde, Rosa Martínez and Jorge Luis Bail.

In the runup to the November 2019 Spanish general election, Equo withdrew from Unidas Podemos and agreed an electoral fusion with Más País. Disagreeing with this decision and willing to stay with Unidas Podemos, Equo founder Juanxto López de Uralde left the party and founded Green Alliance.

In 2021, the party decided to change its name to Greens Equo.

In the Congress of Deputies, thanks to the agreement reached with Más País, from 2019 to 2023 it had a female deputy, Inés Sabanés. After the 2023 national elections they integrated in Sumar (electoral platform) but they didn't obtain any deputy.

Since the regional elections in 2023, in the Valencian Parliament, within the Compromís coalition, it has two representatives of its own: Juan Bordera (independent) and Paula Espinosa. In the Balearic Parliament is present with David Abril in Més and in the Madrid Assembly is represented by Alejandro Sánchez Pérez, María Pastor and Paz Serra in Más Madrid.

=== Spokesperson ===
EQUO, like other European environmental parties, uses the terminology "co-spokespersons" for its two main political leaders, one of each sex, since one of the hallmarks of the European Green Party and EQUO is the strict maintenance of parity in its governing bodies. Thus, on 30 June 2011, in a vote open to members and supporters, Juan López de Uralde and Reyes Montiel were elected as co-spokespersons at the state level. Both were re-elected at EQUO's first congress in July 2012. The people elected in the federal executive committee were: Juan López de Uralde, Itziar Aguirre, Pepa López, Reyes Montiel, Carolina López, Alejandro Sánchez, Rafa Font, Pilar Álvarez, Neus Truyol, Carmen Tejero, Pepe Larios, Pau de Vílchez, Nacho González and Pasqual Mollà. On 24 May 2014, one day before the European elections, Reyes Montiel resigned as co-spokesperson. The party's federal executive committee elected Carolina López in her place on May 29, 2014.

On 2 November 2014 (Second Federal Assembly), Juan López de Uralde and Rosa Martínez were elected again. The people elected in the federal executive committee were: Carolina López, Carmen Tejero, Itziar Aguirre, Irene Fernández-Mayoralas, Sonia Ortiga, Mar de Salas, Aitor Urresti, Alejandro Sánchez, Juvenal García, Sergio Aguilar, Ramón Linaza, Josep Ruíz; and Teresa Herreno as Tresourer.

On 6 and 7 November 2016, at the Third Federal Assembly of EQUO, Juan López de Uralde and Rosa Martínez were elected Co-spokespersons. Following Rosa Martínez's resignation, Marta Santos became Co-spokesperson. The people elected in the federal executive committee were: Alejandro Aguilar, Pilar Calvo, Beatriz del Hoyo, Mar de Salas, Carmen Ibarlucea, Pepe Larios, Sara Martínez, Monika Monteagudo, Mateo Quirós, Elena Revuelta, Cristina Rodríguez and Marta Santos.

In October 2018, at the Fourth Assembly of EQUO, and following the agreement of several prominent EQUO members, Löic Alejando and former MP for Andalusia, Carmen Molina, were elected Co-spokespersons. Molina, who had to resign following the problems in the 2019 European elections, were elected. When this happened, María Antonia Gómez stepped in to replace her. The people elected in the federal executive committee were: Nieves Montero, Edurne Baranda, Beatriz del Hoyo, María Antonia (Toñi) Gómez Navarro, Marta Santos, Dolores Póliz, Sindo Rubín González, Loïc Alejandro, David Baidez García, José Manuel Zúñiga Suescun, Jorge Lozano Mendoza, Francisco Pineda Zamorano; and Silvia Lucas as Tresourer.

After a difficult electoral period, the party re-established itself at the 5th EQUO Assembly and called for a renewal of the co-spokespersons and the Federal Executive. In March 2020, its members elected two new federal co-spokespersons, well known in the field of political ecology. This time, Inés Sabanés, a member of the House of Representatives from the Más País-EQUO coalition, and Florent Marcellesi, a former European Green MEP, both of whom obtained support exceeding 70% to begin this new phase. The people elected in the federal executive committee were: Silvia Rodríguez, Ana Álvarez, Miriam Graña, Silvia Mellado, María Antonia (Toñi) Gómez Navarro, Olga Álvarez, Alfons Domínguez, Rodolfo Coloma, Txema Olleta, Jorge Luis Bail, Jorge Lozano, Hugo de Armas; and Silvia Lucas as Tresourer.

At the 6th EQUO Assembly, Florent Marcellesi repeated and the former Huesca Councillor Silvia Mellado were elected as co-spokespersons. The people elected in the federal executive committee were: Silvia Rodríguez, Ana Álvarez, Miriam Graña, Irene Vivas, Catalina Abell, Astrid Portero, Alfons Domínguez, Rodolfo Coloma, Txema Olleta, Bertomeu Tugores, Jorge Lozano, Pepe Escrig; and Anja Kruschinski as Tresourer.

In the 7th EQUO Assembly, Mar González and Jose Ramón Becerra, General Director of Animal Rights of Spain were elected as co-spokespersons. The people elected in the federal executive committee were: Mireia Roncero, Ana Álvarez, Chusa Barrantes, Catalina Abell, Esther Gómez, Astrid Portero, Rodolfo Coloma, Bartomeu Tugores, Miguel Ángel Heredia, Rufino Fernández, Hugo Abad Frías (substituted by Pedro Fuentes), Aurelio González; and Anja Kruschinski as Tresourer.

In November 2025, the party was renamed to the "Green Party".

== Electoral performance ==
=== Cortes Generales ===
Congress of Deputies
Date	Votes			Seats		Status	Size
Date	#	%	±pp	#	±	Status	Size
2011	216,748	0.9%	—	0 / 350	—	N/A	9th
2015	5,212,711	20.7%	N/A	3 / 350	3	New election	*
2016	5,087,538	21.2%	N/A	3 / 350	0	Opposition	**
2019 (Apr)	3,732,929	14.3%	N/A	1 / 350	2	New election	**
2019 (Nov)	582,306	2.40%	N/A	1 / 350	0	Confidence and supply	***
2023	3,044,996	12.30%	N/A	0 / 350	1	Government	****

Senate
Date	Seats		Size
Date	#	±	Size
2011	0 / 208	—	13th
2015	0 / 208	0	*
2016	0 / 208	0	**
2019 (Apr)	0 / 208	0	**
2019 (Nov)	0 / 208	0	***
2023	0 / 208	0	****

- * Within Podemos—En Comú Podem–És el moment–En Marea.
- ** Within Unidos Podemos.
- *** In coalition with Más País.
- **** In coalition with Sumar.

== See also ==
- Renewable energy
