= United Left–Madrid =

United Left–Madrid Izquierda Unida–Madrid
- Spokesperson: Mauricio Valiente; Sol Sánchez
- Founded: 2 April 2016
- Preceded by: United Left of the Community of Madrid
- Ideology: Democratic socialism; Communism; Republicanism; Federalism; Eco-socialism; Secularism
- Political position: Left-wing to far-left
- National affiliation: United Left
- Congress of Deputies: 1 / 36
- Assembly of Madrid: 0 / 129
- Local seats (2016-2019): 110 / 1,967 (Candidates gained in coalitions or unitary lists not included)

Website
- www.iu-madrid.es

United Left–Madrid (Spanish: Izquierda Unida–Madrid, IU-Madrid) is the regional branch in the Community of Madrid of United Left since 2016.
