= Beatriz Gimeno =

Spanish activist

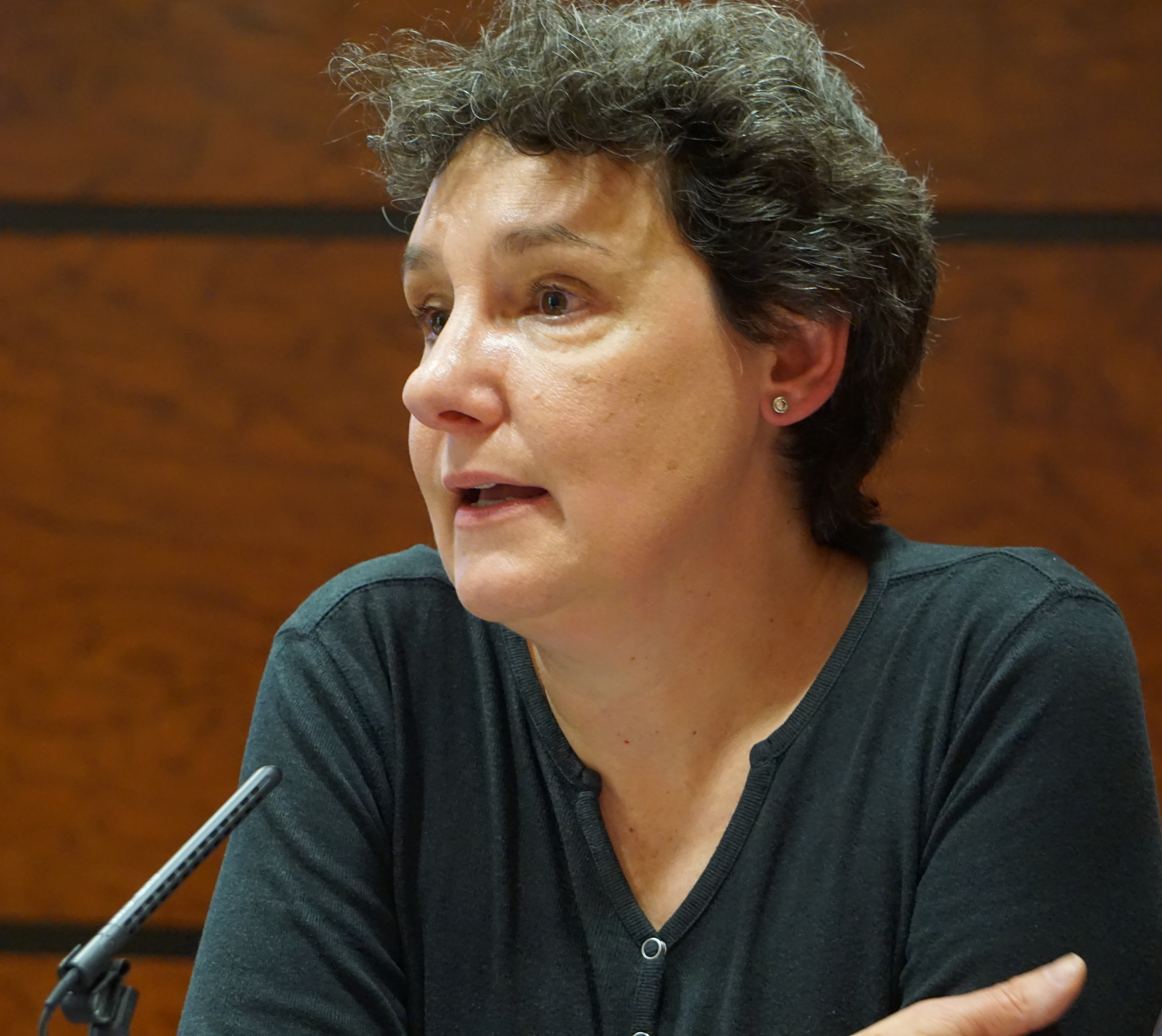
Gimeno in 2016

Beatriz Gimeno Reinoso (born 9 May 1962, Madrid) is a Spanish politician and LGBTQ rights activist. Since June 2015, she has been a representative for Podemos in the tenth legislative term of the Assembly of Madrid and is responsible for the area of policy of Podemos concerning equality in Madrid. She was the President of the FELGT (National Federation of Lesbians, Gays, and Transsexuals) between 2003 and 2007, during the period in which same-sex marriage was approved in Spain and Madrid was chosen as the holder of Europride 2007.

== Early career ==
Beatriz Gimeno studied Semitic languages. In 1985 she moved with her family to Sevilla, and in 1988 started to attend the meetings of a feminist group, the first group of many that she would go on to participate in. In 1990, she fell in love with a fellow participant of these groups. Upon returning to Madrid she joined COGAM (Lesbians, Gays, Transsexuals and Bisexuals Collective Organisation), and in 1995 started to focus on working with the FELGTB (National Federation of Lesbians, Gays, Transsexuals and Bisexuals). She held the position of Secretary General within FELGTB until she assumed the presidency in 2002, replacing Pedro Zerolo. She left the position on 6 March 2007 in order to be a member of culture within the FELGTB, promoting LGBT studies in the culture and the university; her successor as head of FELGTB was Antonio Poveda. Beatriz Gimeno works within diverse mediums of communication, among them the daily digital newspaper El Plural.

== Political career ==
In the autonomous elections of Madrid in 2015, was the fourth member in the list of Podemos, becoming a member of the Assembly of Madrid. In February 2017, she led the Anti-capitalists along with Miguel Urbán for the primaries elections for Podemos.

== Lesbian feminist ==
Gimeno has indicated that there exists a 'gay machismo' within the homosexual movement, owed to the idea that women within the movement would be 'doubly discriminated' due to the fact that they are both lesbians and women. She published diverse, specialised works on the theme of lesbian feminism and positioned herself on numerous occasions in opposition to the legalisation of prostitution, denouncing the commodification of the female body under neoliberalism.

== Same-sex marriage in Spain ==
During the deliberation of the law to approve same-sex marriage in Spain, Gimeno, in her position as President of the FELGTB, lashed out against the stance of the People's Party (Spain) as well as the Catholic Church, who strongly opposed the proposed regulation of same-sex partnerships. The FELGTB called for a large march, that coincided with the Pride Parade, to celebrate the new law.

== Personal life ==
After a decade-long relationship with fellow FELGTB activist Boti García Rodrigo, they got married in December 2005. The wedding – officiated by Inés Sabanés with the participation of Pedro Zerolo of the PSOE and Luis Asua of the PP – was attended by 110 guests, among them was the general coordinator of IU, Gaspar Llamazares, the Minister of International Cooperation, Leire Pajín, the Public Defender of the Basque Country, Iñigo Lamarca, the writer Almudena Grandes and the poet Luis García Montero Gimeno has a child who was born in the 80s.

== Works ==
- Gimeno Reinoso, Beatriz (2002). Primeras caricias: 50 mujeres cuentan su primera experiencia con otra mujer. Ediciones de la Tempestad. 978-84-8198-521-4.
- Gimeno Reinoso, Beatriz; García Rodrigo, Boti (2004). ¿Seré lesbiana?. Proyectos y Producciones Editoriales Cyan, S.L. 978-84-95440-64-8.
- Gimeno Reinoso, Beatriz (2005). Su cuerpo era su gozo. Foca Ediciones y Distribuciones Generales S.L. 978-84-9784-103-0.
- Gimeno Reinoso, Beatriz (2006). La liberación de una generación : historia y análisis político del lesbianismo (2006). Editorial Gedisa, S.A. 84-9784-103-4.
- Gimeno Reinoso, Beatriz (2009). La luz que más me llama. Olifante. Ediciones de Poesía. 978-84-85815-82-1.
- Gimeno Reinoso, Beatriz (2009). Deseo, placer. InÉditor. Colección Imaginatio. 978-84-936971-3-6.
- Gimeno Reinoso, Beatriz (2012). La prostitución. Edicions Bellaterra. 978-84-7290-566-5.
