= Boti García Rodrigo =

Spanish professor and activist (born 1945)

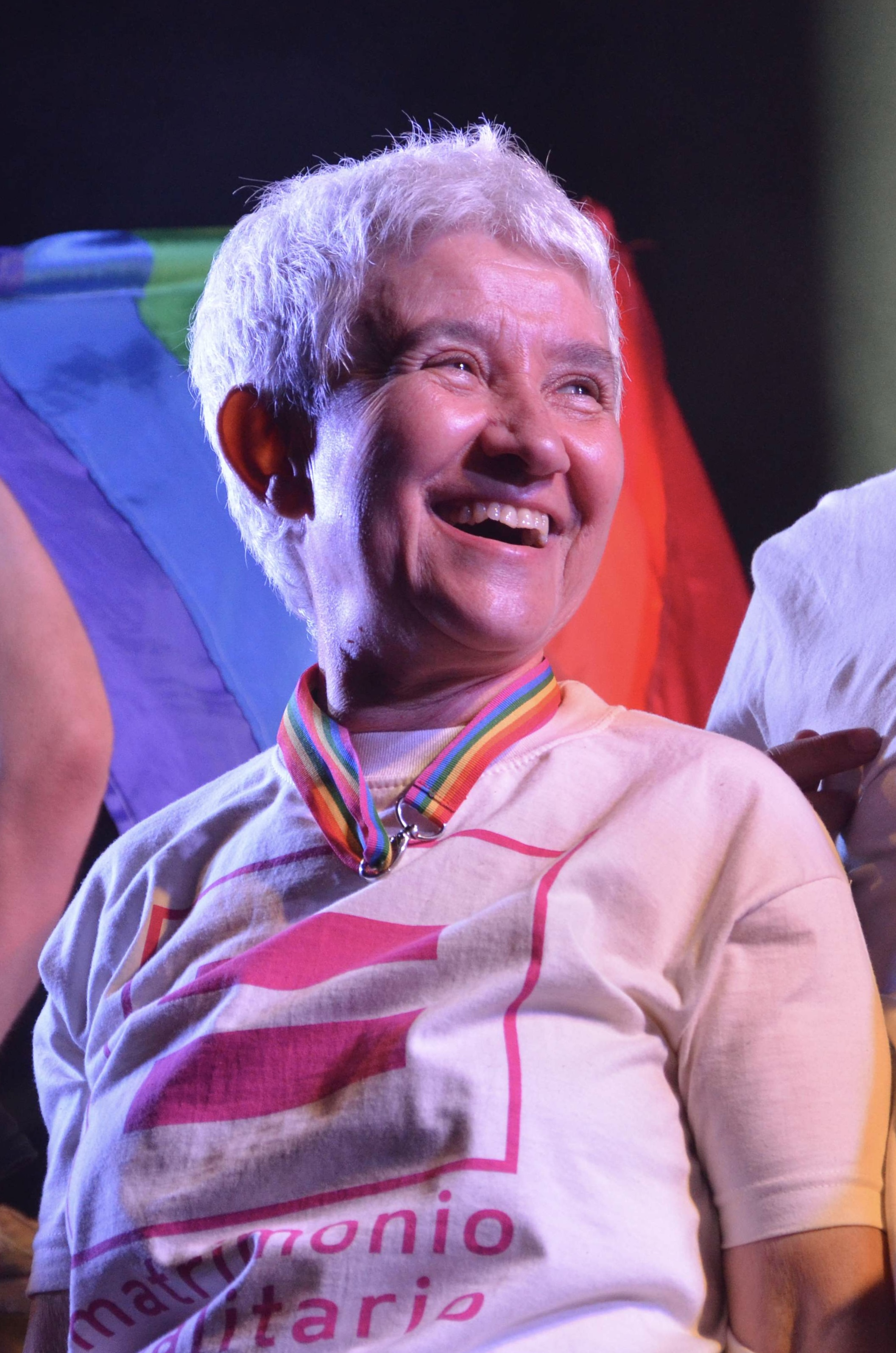
- Boti in 2012

1st General Directorate of Sexual Diversity and LGBTI rights
- In office 31 January 2020 – 8 December 2023
- Preceded by: Office established
- Succeeded by: Julio del Valle de Íscar

Personal details
- Born: María Dolores García Rodrigo; 30 May 1945 (age 81) Madrid, Spain
- Party: Izquierda Unida
- Spouse: Beatriz Gimeno (m. 2005; div. 2012)
- Education: Complutense University of Madrid
- Occupation: Professor; LGBTI activist

María Dolores García Rodrigo (born 30 May 1945), commonly known as Boti García Rodrigo, is a Spanish professor and LGBTI activist who served as the first General Directorate of Sexual Diversity and LGBTI rights of the Ministry of Equality from 2020 to 2023. As the former president of the Federación Estatal de Lesbianas, Gays, Transexuales y Bisexuales (FELGTB), she oversaw COGAM. Additionally, she served as the collective's representative on the United Left electoral lists. The Madrid City Council awarded her the Medalla de Madrid in recognition of her rights advocacy in 2018.

== Early life and education ==
Born in her family home on 30 May 1945, in Madrid. Boti is of Canarian and Valencian descent. She graduated from the Complutense University of Madrid with a bachelor's degree in philosophy and letters in December 1969. She spent more than ten years as a professor before being assigned as a Ministry of Justice official and spending more than twenty years at the Madrid Civil Registration.

== Activism ==
Boti started working as an LBTI activist after retiring. She joined COGAM in the middle of the 1990s, rising to the position of vice president before becoming president. He began working for the FELGTB executive in 2000 as the director of institutional relations. He succeeded Antonio Poveda as president of the organisation from March 2012 until 2015. Currently, she is a member of the advisory committee.

At Gaspar Llamazares' request, Boti ran with Izquierda Unida (IU) in 2004 for the Congress of Deputies, representing Madrid with the number 6. In protest of the "intolerance" of the Catholic Church and the backing of the Popular Party (PP), she joined the kiss organised by the FELGTB in front of the Almudena Cathedral the same year on behalf of IU. Approximately 300 gays took part in the kiss. In 2008, she ran again with IU, this time placing seventh on the list, and in 2011, she did the same with Equo, placing sixth. She was the first lesbian president of an LGBT organisation to hold that post in Spain.

By royal order 219/2020, Boti was appointed on 31 January 2020, as the General Directorate of Sexual Diversity and LGTBI Rights of the Ministry of Equality. She acknowledges that although lesbians were obliged to remain invisible during the Franco era, they were fortunate to be spared the homophobia of patriarchy and national Catholicism, whereas transgender individuals were the ones who suffered most. She ended her tenure as general director on 8 December 2023.

== Personal life ==
In December 2005, following a decade-long relationship with fellow activist Beatriz Gimeno, they married under the direction of Inés Sabanés, with Councilor Pedro Zerolo of the PSOE and Luis Asúa of the PP in attendance. 110 people attended the event, including Llamazares, the IU general coordinator, Leire Pajín, the secretary of state for international cooperation, Iñigo Lamarca, the Basque Country's ararteko, Almudena Grandes, the writer, and Luis García Montero, the poet. As of right now, she is divorced.

== Awards and recognitions ==
Boti was one of the seven recipients of the Adriano Antinoo Awards II Edition, which were given out on 7 April 2013, by the Sevillian LGBT group and the Cajasol Foundation in recognition of her fight for human freedom and equality. 2019 saw her get the State Award for Social Volunteering in its particular form.

- Gold Degree of the Medalla de Madrid (May 2018)
- Medal of the Order of Constitutional Merit (June 2026)
