= 2003 Madrid municipal election =

Election in the Spanish municipality of Madrid

- 25 May 2003

All 55 seats in the City Council of Madrid 28 seats needed for a majority
- Opinion polls
- Registered: 2,484,328 ▼0.2%
- Turnout: 1,711,613 (68.9%) ▲8.9 pp
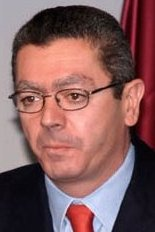

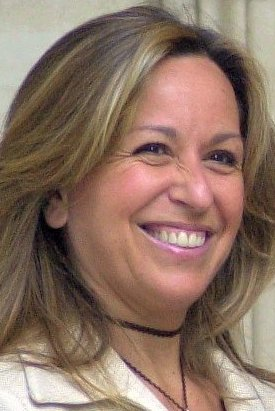

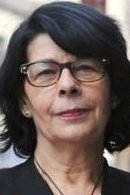
	First party	Second party	Third party
Leader	Alberto Ruiz-Gallardón	Trinidad Jiménez	Inés Sabanés
Party	PP	PSOE	IUCM
Leader since	18 July 2002	21 May 2002	23 June 1998
Last election	28 seats, 49.5%	20 seats, 36.0%	5 seats, 8.7%
Seats won	30	21	4
Seat change	▲2	▲1	▼1
Popular vote	874,264	625,148	123,015
Percentage	51.3%	36.7%	7.2%
Swing	▲1.8 pp	▲0.7 pp	▼1.5 pp
Mayor before election
José María Álvarez del Manzano
PP
Mayor after election
Alberto Ruiz-Gallardón
PP

A municipal election was held in Madrid on 25 May 2003 to elect the 7th City Council of the municipality. All 55 seats in the City Council were up for election. It was held concurrently with regional elections in thirteen autonomous communities and local elections all across Spain.

The People's Party (PP) under President of the Community of Madrid Alberto Ruiz-Gallardón, who was succeeding the retiring José María Álvarez del Manzano, managed to revert the near-tie situation predicted by opinion polls between his party and the PSOE-IU bloc. Gallardón went on to win a comfortable absolute majority both in votes and seats, reverting the 1999 result in which it had seemed that party's support had begun to decline. The Spanish Socialist Workers' Party (PSOE) under Trinidad Jiménez obtained its best result since it was ousted from power in 1989, despite it not being enough to recover the mayoralty. United Left (IU) continued on its long-term decline and lost another seat, scoring its worst result since 1987.

A remarkable event for this election was that both main parties' contenders (Ruiz-Gallardón and Jiménez) were cousins, despite belonging to opposing parties.

== Overview ==
Under the 1978 Constitution, the governance of municipalities in Spain—part of the country's local government system—was centered on the figure of city councils (Spanish: ayuntamientos), local corporations with independent legal personality composed of a mayor, a government council and an elected legislative assembly. The mayor was indirectly elected by the local assembly, requiring an absolute majority; otherwise, the candidate from the most-voted party automatically became mayor (ties were resolved by drawing lots). In the case of Madrid, the top-tier administrative and governing body was the City Council of Madrid.

=== Date ===
The term of local assemblies in Spain expired four years after the date of their previous election, with election day being fixed for the fourth Sunday of May every four years. The election decree was required to be issued no later than 54 days before the scheduled election date and published on the following day in the Official State Gazette (BOE). The previous local elections were held on 13 June 1999, setting the date for election day on the fourth Sunday of May four years later, which was 25 May 2003.

Local assemblies could not be dissolved before the expiration of their term, except in cases of mismanagement that seriously harmed the public interest and implied a breach of constitutional obligations, in which case the Council of Ministers could—optionally—decide to call a by-election.

Elections to the assemblies of local entities were officially called on 1 April 2003 with the publication of the corresponding decree in the BOE, setting election day for 25 May.

=== Electoral system ===
Voting for local assemblies was based on universal suffrage, comprising all Spanish nationals over 18 years of age, registered and residing in the municipality and with full political rights (provided that they had not been deprived of the right to vote by a final sentence, nor were legally incapacitated), as well as resident non-national European citizens, and those whose country of origin allowed reciprocal voting by virtue of a treaty.

Local councillors were elected using the D'Hondt method and closed-list proportional voting, with a five percent-threshold of valid votes (including blank ballots) in each municipality. Each municipality was a multi-member constituency, with a number of seats based on the following scale:

Population	Councillors
<250	5
251–1,000	7
1,001–2,000	9
2,001–5,000	11
5,001–10,000	13
10,001–20,000	17
20,001–50,000	21
50,001–100,000	25
>100,001	+1 per each 100,000 inhabitants or fraction +1 if total is an even number

The law did not provide for by-elections to fill vacant seats; instead, any vacancies arising after the proclamation of candidates and during the legislative term were filled by the next candidates on the party lists or, when required, by designated substitutes.

== Parties and candidates ==
The electoral law allowed for parties and federations registered in the interior ministry, alliances and groupings of electors to present lists of candidates. Parties and federations intending to form an alliance were required to inform the relevant electoral commission within 10 days of the election call, whereas groupings of electors needed to secure the signature of a determined amount of the electors registered in the municipality for which they sought election, disallowing electors from signing for more than one list. In the case of Madrid, as its population was over 1,000,001, at least 8,000 signatures were required.

Below is a list of the main parties and alliances which contested the election:

Candidacy	Parties and alliances	Leading candidate	Ideology	Previous result		Gov.	Ref.
Candidacy	Parties and alliances	Leading candidate	Ideology	Vote %	Seats	Gov.	Ref.
PP	List: People's Party (PP)	Alberto Ruiz-Gallardón	Conservatism; Christian democracy	49.5%	28	Yes	
PSOE	List: Spanish Socialist Workers' Party (PSOE)	Trinidad Jiménez	Social democracy	36.0%	20	No	
IUCM	List: United Left of the Community of Madrid (IUCM) – Communist Party of Madrid (PCM) – Revolutionary Workers' Party (POR) – Workers' Revolutionary Party–Revolutionary Left (PRT–IR)	Inés Sabanés	Socialism; Communism	8.7%	5	No	
LV	List: The Greens (LV)	José María Mendiluce	Green politics	0.7%	0	No	

== Opinion polls ==
The tables below list opinion polling results in reverse chronological order, showing the most recent first and using the dates when the survey fieldwork was done, as opposed to the date of publication. Where the fieldwork dates are unknown, the date of publication is given instead. The highest percentage figure in each polling survey is displayed with its background shaded in the leading party's colour. If a tie ensues, this is applied to the figures with the highest percentages. The "Lead" column on the right shows the percentage-point difference between the parties with the highest percentages in a poll.

=== Voting intention estimates ===
The table below lists weighted voting intention estimates. Refusals are generally excluded from the party vote percentages, while question wording and the treatment of "don't know" responses and those not intending to vote may vary between polling organisations. When available, seat projections determined by the polling organisations are displayed below (or in place of) the percentages in a smaller font; 28 seats were required for an absolute majority in the City Council of Madrid (27 in the 1999 election).

Color key:

Exit poll

Polling firm/Commissioner	Fieldwork date	Sample size	Turnout	PP	PSOE	IUCM	LV	Lead
2003 municipal election	25 May 2003	—N/a	68.9	51.3; 30	36.7; 21	7.2; 4	1.6; 0	14.6
Sigma Dos/Antena 3	25 May 2003	?	?	? 27/29	? 22/23	? 4/5	–	?
Ipsos–Eco/RTVE	25 May 2003	?	?	? 27/28	? 22/23	? 5/6	–	?
Insight/La Razón	19 May 2003	?	?	47.2; 28	39.8; 22	9.1; 5	–	7.4
Opina/El País	18 May 2003	?	?	47.0; 27/28	40.0; 23/24	7.0; 4	–	7.0
Demoscopia/PP	17 May 2003	?	?	48.5– 50.0; 28/29	38.5– 39.5; 22/23	6.5– 7.5; 3/4	3.0– 4.0; 0	10.0– 10.5
Sigma Dos/El Mundo	8–13 May 2003	500	?	47.5; 27/28	39.7; 22/24	8.3; 4/5	2.4; 0	7.8
Vox Pública/El Periódico	12–13 May 2003	801	?	46.5– 47.5; 27/28	40.0– 41.0; 23/24	7.0– 8.0; 4	2.0– 3.0; 0	6.5
CIS	22 Mar–28 Apr 2003	714	76.7	45.4; 27	35.9; 22	10.3; 6	–	9.5
Ipsos–Eco/ABC	22–24 Apr 2003	?	?	47.0; 27/28	40.7; 24	6.7; 3/4	–	6.3
IMOP/PSOE	11 Mar 2003	513	66	45.1; 27	41.4; 25	6.2; 3	2.0; 0	3.7
Sondaxe/La Voz de Galicia	18 Jan 2003	?	?	54.4; 30	36.5; 20	7.2; 3	–	17.9
Opina/El País	25–26 Nov 2002	800	?	49.0; 27	42.0; 23	6.0; 3	1.5; 0	7.0
Demoscopia/CEIM	18–25 Oct 2002	2,471	?	54.1	35.2	5.2	4.8	18.9
Opina/El País	29 Sep 2002	?	?	49.0	42.0	6.5	–	7.0
Ipsos–Eco/ABC	6–13 Sep 2002	?	?	49.0; 28	37.7; 21	7.6; 4	–	11.3
Inner Line/PSOE	29 Jun 2002	1,200	?	46.0– 47.0	40.0– 41.0	8.0– 9.0	–	6.0
Demoscopia/IU	27 Jun 2002	1,200	65.7	48.0	39.1	11.0	–	8.9
Inner Line/PSOE	23 May–8 Jun 2001	1,200	?	47.0; 26	40.0; 22	10.0; 5	–	7.0
2000 general election	12 Mar 2000	—N/a	74.2	55.4 (31)	30.9 (17)	8.8 (5)	0.7 (0)	24.5
1999 municipal election	13 Jun 1999	—N/a	60.0	49.5; 28	36.0; 20	8.7; 5	0.7; 0	13.5

=== Voting preferences ===
The table below lists raw, unweighted voting preferences.

Polling firm/Commissioner	Fieldwork date	Sample size	PP	PSOE	IUCM	LV	Question	X mark	Lead
2003 municipal election	25 May 2003	—N/a	35.2	25.2	5.0	1.1	—N/a	31.1	10.0
Vox Pública/El Periódico	12–13 May 2003	801	37.7	30.7	5.7	2.7	17.7	3.0	7.0
CIS	22 Mar–28 Apr 2003	714	32.8	26.8	8.5	–	19.8	6.0	6.0
Demoscopia/CEIM	18–25 Oct 2002	2,471	39.0	24.9	4.5	3.5	18.9	7.4	14.1
2000 general election (Note: Does not include non-resident citizens.)	12 Mar 2000	—N/a	40.9	22.8	6.5	0.5	—N/a	25.8	18.1
1999 municipal election	13 Jun 1999	—N/a	29.5	21.5	5.2	0.4	—N/a	40.0	8.0

=== Victory preferences ===
The table below lists opinion polling on the victory preferences for each party in the event of a municipal election taking place.

Polling firm/Commissioner	Fieldwork date	Sample size	PP	PSOE	IUCM	Other/ None	Question	Lead
Ipsos–Eco/ABC	22–24 Apr 2003	?	42.6	34.2	5.6	1.8	15.7	8.4

=== Victory likelihood ===
The table below lists opinion polling on the perceived likelihood of victory for each party in the event of a municipal election taking place.

Polling firm/Commissioner	Fieldwork date	Sample size	PP	PSOE	Other/ None	Question	Lead
Ipsos–Eco/ABC	22–24 Apr 2003	?	56.2	23.3	1.0	19.5	32.9
Ipsos–Eco/ABC	6–13 Sep 2002	?	54.4	18.1	0.6	26.8	36.3

=== Preferred Mayor ===
The table below lists opinion polling on leader preferences to become mayor of Madrid.

Polling firm/Commissioner	Fieldwork date	Sample size					Other/ None/ Not care	Question	Lead
Polling firm/Commissioner	Fieldwork date	Sample size	Gallardón PP	Jiménez PSOE	Sabanés IUCM	Mendiluce LV	Other/ None/ Not care	Question	Lead
Vox Pública/El Periódico	12–13 May 2003	801	42.8	28.2	4.7	2.0	8.3	13.9	14.6
Opina/El País	25–26 Nov 2002	800	41.3	27.1	–	–	31.6		14.2

=== Predicted Mayor ===
The table below lists opinion polling on the perceived likelihood for each leader to become mayor.

Polling firm/Commissioner	Fieldwork date	Sample size					Other/ None/ Not care	Question	Lead
Polling firm/Commissioner	Fieldwork date	Sample size	Gallardón PP	Jiménez PSOE	Sabanés IUCM	Mendiluce LV	Other/ None/ Not care	Question	Lead
Vox Pública/El Periódico	12–13 May 2003	801	59.1	18.0	0.5	0.2	1.3	20.9	41.1
Opina/El País	25–26 Nov 2002	800	58.9	10.8	–	–	30.3		48.1

== Results ==
← Summary of the 25 May 2003 City Council of Madrid election results →
Parties and alliances	Popular vote			Seats	
Parties and alliances	Votes	%	±pp	Total	+/−
People's Party (PP)	874,264	51.30	+1.82	30	+2
Spanish Socialist Workers' Party (PSOE)	625,148	36.68	+0.68	21	+1
United Left of the Community of Madrid (IUCM)	123,015	7.22	−1.45	4	−1
The Greens (LV)	26,448	1.55	+0.85	0	±0
The Greens of the Community of Madrid (LVCM)	9,944	0.58	New	0	±0
Republican Left (IR)	3,553	0.21	New	0	±0
Family and Life Party (PFyV)	3,094	0.18	New	0	±0
The Phalanx (FE)	2,174	0.13	+0.02	0	±0
Democratic and Social Centre (CDS)	2,136	0.13	−0.32	0	±0
Independent Spanish Phalanx (FEI)	1,113	0.07	−0.01	0	±0
Humanist Party (PH)	1,022	0.06	−0.07	0	±0
Madrilenian Independent Regional Party (PRIM)	903	0.05	−0.06	0	±0
Commoners' Land–Castilian Nationalist Party (TC–PNC)	820	0.05	−0.02	0	±0
Another Democracy is Possible (ODeP)	810	0.05	New	0	±0
Spanish Democratic Party (PADE)	801	0.05	±0.00	0	±0
Authentic Phalanx (FA)	635	0.04	New	0	±0
Immigrants with Rights, Equality and Obligations (INDIO)	479	0.03	New	0	±0
Republican Federation (FR)	478	0.03	New	0	±0
Blank ballots	27,304	1.60	−1.30		
Total	1,704,141			55	+2
Valid votes	1,704,141	99.56	+0.14		
Invalid votes	7,472	0.44	−0.14		
Votes cast / turnout	1,711,613	68.90	+8.86		
Abstentions	772,715	31.10	−8.86		
Registered voters	2,484,328				

Popular vote
PP	51.30%
PSOE	36.68%
IUCM	7.22%
LV	1.55%
Others	1.64%
Blank ballots	1.60%

Seats
PP	54.55%
PSOE	38.18%
IUCM	7.27%

== Aftermath ==
=== Government formation ===
Investiture
Ballot →	14 June 2003	
Required majority →	28 out of 55	
Alberto Ruiz-Gallardón (PP): • PP (30)	30 / 55	check
Trinidad Jiménez (PSOE): • PSOE (21)	21 / 55	X mark
Inés Sabanés (IUCM): • IUCM (4)	4 / 55	X mark
Abstentions/Blank ballots	0 / 55	
Absentees	0 / 55	

== Bibliography ==
- Decreto 1674/1963, de 11 de julio, por el que se aprueba el texto articulado de la Ley que establece un régimen especial para el Municipio de Madrid (PDF) (Decree 1674/1963). Official State Gazette (in Spanish). 11 July 1963. BOE-A-1963-14593.
- Constitución Española (Constitution). Official State Gazette (in Spanish). 27 December 1978 [version as of 28 August 1992]. BOE-A-1978-31229.
- Ley 7/1985, de 2 de abril, Reguladora de las Bases del Régimen Local (Law 7/1985). Official State Gazette (in Spanish). 2 April 1985 [version as of 11 March 2003]. BOE-A-1985-5392.
- Ley Orgánica 5/1985, de 19 de junio, del Régimen Electoral General (Organic Law 5/1985). Official State Gazette (in Spanish). 19 June 1985 [version as of 11 March 2003]. BOE-A-1985-11672.
- Real Decreto 374/2003, de 31 de marzo, por el que se convocan elecciones locales y a las Asambleas de Ceuta y Melilla (Royal Decree 374/2003). Official State Gazette (in Spanish). 31 March 2003. BOE-A-2003-6489.
