= 1999 Madrid municipal election =

Election in the Spanish municipality of Madrid

- 13 June 1999

All 53 seats in the City Council of Madrid 27 seats needed for a majority
- Opinion polls
- Registered: 2,488,296 ▼1.6%
- Turnout: 1,494,090 (60.0%) ▼11.3 pp
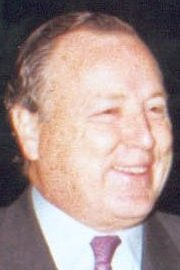

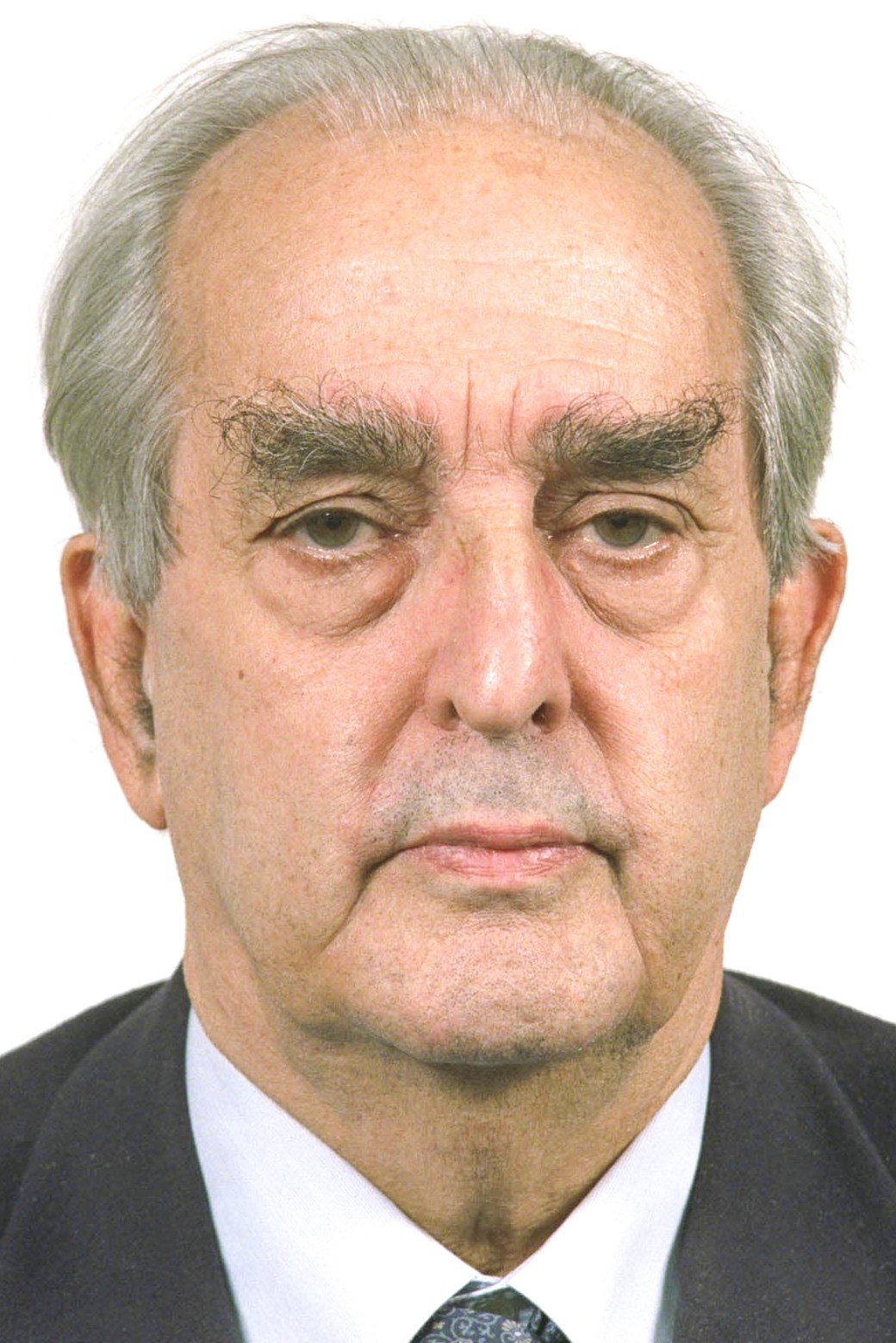

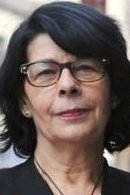
| | First party | Second party | Third party |
|---|---|---|---|
| Leader | José María Álvarez del Manzano | Fernando Morán | Inés Sabanés |
| Party | PP | PSOE–p | IU |
| Leader since | 10 October 1986 | 27 June 1998 | 23 June 1998 |
| Last election | 30 seats, 52.7% | 16 seats, 27.8% | 9 seats, 15.6% |
| Seats won | 28 | 20 | 5 |
| Seat change | ▼2 | ▲4 | ▼4 |
| Popular vote | 734,921 | 534,700 | 128,731 |
| Percentage | 49.5% | 36.0% | 8.7% |
| Swing | ▼3.2 pp | ▲8.2 pp | ▼6.9 pp |
Mayor before election
José María Álvarez del Manzano
PP
Mayor after election
José María Álvarez del Manzano
PP

A municipal election was held in Madrid on 13 June 1999 to elect the 6th City Council of the municipality. All 53 seats in the City Council were up for election. It was held concurrently with regional elections in thirteen autonomous communities and local elections all across Spain, as well as the 1999 European Parliament election.

The People's Party (PP) won an absolute majority of seats for a third consecutive time, but, for the first time since the 1987 election the party lost votes and seats. The Spanish Socialist Workers' Party (PSOE) maintained its second place but reverted the decline it had been suffering since 1983. PSOE gains came at the expense of United Left (IU), which lost nearly half of its votes and seats.

As a result, José María Álvarez del Manzano was elected as Mayor of Madrid for a third term in office.

== Overview ==
Under the 1978 Constitution, the governance of municipalities in Spain—part of the country's local government system—was centered on the figure of city councils (Spanish: ayuntamientos), local corporations with independent legal personality composed of a mayor, a government council and an elected legislative assembly. The mayor was indirectly elected by the local assembly, requiring an absolute majority; otherwise, the candidate from the most-voted party automatically became mayor (ties were resolved by drawing lots). In the case of Madrid, the top-tier administrative and governing body was the City Council of Madrid.

=== Date ===
The term of local assemblies in Spain expired four years after the date of their previous election, with election day being fixed for the fourth Sunday of May every four years, but a 1998 amendment allowed for local elections held in May 1995 to be held concurrently with European Parliament elections, provided that they were scheduled for within a four month-timespan. The election decree was required to be issued no later than 54 days before the scheduled election date and published on the following day in the Official State Gazette (BOE). The previous local elections were held on 28 May 1995, setting the date for election day concurrently with that year's European Parliament election on 13 June 1999.

Local assemblies could not be dissolved before the expiration of their term, except in cases of mismanagement that seriously harmed the public interest and implied a breach of constitutional obligations, in which case the Council of Ministers could—optionally—decide to call a by-election.

Elections to the assemblies of local entities were officially called on 20 April 1999 with the publication of the corresponding decree in the BOE, setting election day for 13 June.

=== Electoral system ===
Voting for local assemblies was based on universal suffrage, comprising all Spanish nationals over 18 years of age, registered and residing in the municipality and with full political rights (provided that they had not been deprived of the right to vote by a final sentence, nor were legally incapacitated), as well as resident non-national European citizens, and those whose country of origin allowed reciprocal voting by virtue of a treaty.

Local councillors were elected using the D'Hondt method and closed-list proportional voting, with a five percent-threshold of valid votes (including blank ballots) in each municipality. Each municipality was a multi-member constituency, with a number of seats based on the following scale:

| Population | Councillors |
|---|---|
| <250 | 5 |
| 251–1,000 | 7 |
| 1,001–2,000 | 9 |
| 2,001–5,000 | 11 |
| 5,001–10,000 | 13 |
| 10,001–20,000 | 17 |
| 20,001–50,000 | 21 |
| 50,001–100,000 | 25 |
| >100,001 | +1 per each 100,000 inhabitants or fraction +1 if total is an even number |

The law did not provide for by-elections to fill vacant seats; instead, any vacancies arising after the proclamation of candidates and during the legislative term were filled by the next candidates on the party lists or, when required, by designated substitutes.

== Parties and candidates ==
The electoral law allowed for parties and federations registered in the interior ministry, alliances and groupings of electors to present lists of candidates. Parties and federations intending to form an alliance were required to inform the relevant electoral commission within 10 days of the election call, whereas groupings of electors needed to secure the signature of a determined amount of the electors registered in the municipality for which they sought election, disallowing electors from signing for more than one list. In the case of Madrid, as its population was over 1,000,001, at least 8,000 signatures were required.

Below is a list of the main parties and alliances which contested the election:

| Candidacy | Parties and alliances | Leading candidate | Ideology | Previous result | | Gov. | Ref. |
| Candidacy | Parties and alliances | Leading candidate | Ideology | Vote % | Seats | Gov. | Ref. |
|---|---|---|---|---|---|---|---|
| PP | List: People's Party (PP) | José María Álvarez del Manzano | Conservatism; Christian democracy | 52.7% | 30 | Yes | |
| PSOE–p | List: Spanish Socialist Workers' Party (PSOE); Democratic Party of the New Left (PDNI) | Fernando Morán | Social democracy | 27.8% | 16 | No | |
| IU | List: United Left of the Community of Madrid (IU) – Communist Party of Madrid (PCM) – Socialist Action Party (PASOC) – Republican Left (IR) – Revolutionary Workers' Party (POR) – Workers' Revolutionary Party (PRT) | Inés Sabanés | Socialism; Communism | 15.6% | 9 | No | |

== Opinion polls ==
The tables below list opinion polling results in reverse chronological order, showing the most recent first and using the dates when the survey fieldwork was done, as opposed to the date of publication. Where the fieldwork dates are unknown, the date of publication is given instead. The highest percentage figure in each polling survey is displayed with its background shaded in the leading party's colour. If a tie ensues, this is applied to the figures with the highest percentages. The "Lead" column on the right shows the percentage-point difference between the parties with the highest percentages in a poll.

=== Voting intention estimates ===
The table below lists weighted voting intention estimates. Refusals are generally excluded from the party vote percentages, while question wording and the treatment of "don't know" responses and those not intending to vote may vary between polling organisations. When available, seat projections determined by the polling organisations are displayed below (or in place of) the percentages in a smaller font; 27 seats were required for an absolute majority in the City Council of Madrid (28 in the 1995 election).

| Polling firm/Commissioner | Fieldwork date | Sample size | Turnout | PP | PSOE | IU | Lead |
|---|---|---|---|---|---|---|---|
| 1999 municipal election | 13 Jun 1999 | —N/a | 60.0 | 49.5; 28 | 36.0; 20 | 8.7; 5 | 13.5 |
| Sigma Dos/El Mundo | 27 May–2 Jun 1999 | 500 | ? | 51.1; 27/29 | 37.8; 20/22 | 8.3; 4 | 13.3 |
| Eco Consulting/ABC | 24 May–2 Jun 1999 | 400 | ? | 53.1; 29/31 | 32.2; 17/19 | 11.1; 6 | 20.9 |
| Demoscopia/El País | 26 May–1 Jun 1999 | ? | ? | 53.3; 29 | 34.6; 18 | 11.7; 6 | 18.7 |
| CIS | 3–19 May 1999 | ? | ? | 51.9; 28/29 | 29.8; 16/17 | 15.0; 8 | 22.1 |
| Tele 5 | 4 May 1999 | ? | ? | ? 29/30 | ? 18 | ? 6/7 | ? |
| Demoscopia/CEIM | 12–26 Apr 1999 | ? | ? | 50.6; 28/29 | 34.5; 18 | ? 6/7 | 16.1 |
| Demoscopia/CEIM | 1 Mar 1999 | ? | ? | ? 29 | ? 15 | ? 9 | ? |
| Demoscopia/PDNI | 21 Jan–1 Feb 1999 | ? | ? | 50.4; 27 | 40.3; 22 | 7.9; 4 | 10.1 |
| PSOE | 27 Jan 1999 | ? | ? | ? 26 | ? 20 | ? 7 | ? |
| Demoscopia/CEIM | 16–27 Apr 1998 | ? | ? | 50.0 | 31.0 | 15.0 | 19.0 |
| Demoscopia/CEIM | 16–24 Sep 1997 | 1,096 | ? | 50.6; 29 | 33.0; 18 | 14.0; 8 | 17.6 |
| 1996 general election | 3 Mar 1996 | —N/a | 80.2 | 52.8 (30) | 29.3 (17) | 15.1 (8) | 23.5 |
| 1995 municipal election | 28 May 1995 | —N/a | 71.2 | 52.7; 30 | 27.8; 16 | 15.6; 9 | 24.9 |

== Results ==
← Summary of the 13 June 1999 City Council of Madrid election results →
| Parties and alliances | Popular vote | | | Seats | |
| Parties and alliances | Votes | % | ±pp | Total | +/− |
|---|---|---|---|---|---|
| People's Party (PP) | 734,921 | 49.48 | −3.23 | 28 | −2 |
| Spanish Socialist Workers' Party–Progressives (PSOE–p) | 534,700 | 36.00 | +8.16 | 20 | +4 |
| United Left (IU) | 128,731 | 8.67 | −6.89 | 5 | −4 |
| The Greens (LV) | 10,462 | 0.70 | New | 0 | ±0 |
| The Greens–Green Group (LV–GV) | 8,974 | 0.60 | −0.13 | 0 | ±0 |
| Centrist Union–Democratic and Social Centre (UC–CDS) | 6,653 | 0.45 | New | 0 | ±0 |
| Alliance for National Unity (AUN) | 3,500 | 0.24 | New | 0 | ±0 |
| Union Community of Madrid (UCMA) | 2,658 | 0.18 | New | 0 | ±0 |
| Humanist Party (PH) | 1,906 | 0.13 | +0.05 | 0 | ±0 |
| Madrilenian Independent Regional Party (PRIM) | 1,695 | 0.11 | −0.01 | 0 | ±0 |
| The Phalanx (FE) | 1,580 | 0.11 | New | 0 | ±0 |
| Communist Party of the Peoples of Spain (PCPE) | 1,488 | 0.10 | New | 0 | ±0 |
| Independent Spanish Phalanx (FEI) | 1,208 | 0.08 | +0.05 | 0 | ±0 |
| Natural Law Party (PLN) | 1,188 | 0.08 | New | 0 | ±0 |
| Commoners' Land–Castilian Nationalist Party (TC–PNC) | 1,099 | 0.07 | New | 0 | ±0 |
| Republican Action (AR) | 860 | 0.06 | New | 0 | ±0 |
| Spanish Democratic Party (PADE) | 790 | 0.05 | New | 0 | ±0 |
| Blank ballots | 43,021 | 2.90 | +1.15 | | |
| Total | 1,485,434 | | | 53 | −2 |
| Valid votes | 1,485,434 | 99.42 | −0.18 | | |
| Invalid votes | 8,656 | 0.58 | +0.18 | | |
| Votes cast / turnout | 1,494,090 | 60.04 | −11.17 | | |
| Abstentions | 994,206 | 39.96 | +11.17 | | |
| Registered voters | 2,488,296 | | | | |

Popular vote
| PP | 49.48% |
| PSOE–p | 36.00% |
| IU | 8.67% |
| Others | 2.97% |
| Blank ballots | 2.90% |

Seats
| PP | 52.83% |
| PSOE–p | 37.34% |
| IU | 9.43% |

== Aftermath ==
=== Government formation ===
Investiture
| Ballot → | 3 July 1999 | |
| Required majority → | 27 out of 53 | |
| José María Álvarez del Manzano (PP): • PP (28) | 28 / 53 | check |
| Fernando Morán (PSOE–p): • PSOE–p (20) | 20 / 53 | X mark |
| Inés Sabanés (IU): • IU (5) | 5 / 53 | X mark |
| Abstentions/Blank ballots | 0 / 53 | |
| Absentees | 0 / 53 | |

== Bibliography ==
- Decreto 1674/1963, de 11 de julio, por el que se aprueba el texto articulado de la Ley que establece un régimen especial para el Municipio de Madrid (PDF) (Decree 1674/1963). Official State Gazette (in Spanish). 11 July 1963. BOE-A-1963-14593.
- Constitución Española (Constitution). Official State Gazette (in Spanish). 27 December 1978 [version as of 28 August 1992]. BOE-A-1978-31229.
- Ley 7/1985, de 2 de abril, Reguladora de las Bases del Régimen Local (Law 7/1985). Official State Gazette (in Spanish). 2 April 1985 [version as of 22 April 1999]. BOE-A-1985-5392.
- Ley Orgánica 5/1985, de 19 de junio, del Régimen Electoral General (Organic Law 5/1985). Official State Gazette (in Spanish). 19 June 1985 [version as of 22 April 1999]. BOE-A-1985-11672.
- Real Decreto 606/1999, de 19 de abril, de convocatoria de elecciones Locales y a las Asambleas de Ceuta y Melilla (Royal Decree 606/1999). Official State Gazette (in Spanish). 19 April 1999. BOE-A-1999-8719.
