= Carmen García de Merlo =

Spanish lawyer

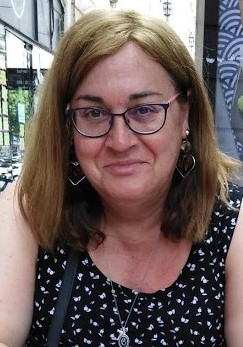
- Born: 27 March 1962 (age 63); Valdepeñas, Castilla–La Mancha, Spain
- Occupation: COGAM former president 2018-2023 /LGBT activist

Carmen García de Merlo (born March 27, 1962) is a Spanish lawyer, nurse and civil servant of Madrid City Council. In 2018, she became President of COGAM Lesbian, Gay, Transsexual and Bisexual Collective of Madrid, being the first transgender woman to preside over the organization.

== Biography ==
García de Merlo, a woman, trans and bisexual, was born in La Mancha town of Valdepeñas, in 1962. She graduated in Law from the National Distance Education University (UNED) and has a Diploma in Nursing from the Complutense University of Madrid (UCM), as well as a Senior Technician in Occupational Health and Safety from the Carlos III University of Madrid. In 1977, she moved to Madrid.

From her childhood, García de Merlo was aware that she felt like a woman, although her birth certificate reflected that she was assigned male at birth. In her youth, she thought about changing her sex but was unable to do so at that time for fear that her working life as a transsexual could be limited to the realm of prostitution and show business. Therefore, she continued with her professional career, in addition to marrying a woman with whom she had two children. However, she continued to maintain the desire to make the gender transition, which led her to consider suicide, although she eventually turned to professional help.

In April 2016, at the age of 54, García de Merlo decided to show herself to society for the first time as a woman, which meant that her relationship with her children was broken.

== Activism ==
After her transition, García de Merlo became an activist to fight for the rights of transgender people. In 2017, she became part of the Transcogam group as a volunteer and, in September 2018, she became president of COGAM, being re-elected to the position two years later.

Since the beginning of her time as an activist, she has attended debates and interviews in different media, in addition to participating in events and talks in which she highlighted the position of COGAM to continue protecting people's rights, LGBT. In 2020, she was in charge of inaugurating the LesGaiCineMad film exhibition, the year in which the festival began a collaboration with the Academy of Cinematographic Arts and Sciences of Spain with the screening of the scriptwriter's documentary Ferrán Navarro-Beltrán entitled The silent generation , which narrated the life stories of LGBTIQ + people during the Francoist Spain and Spanish Transition.

In 2020, a book was written, "Diverse free and Ours, Lives of LBT women", as part of the Pride activities by COGAM in which 20 stories of women are related, García de Merlo among them.

== Documentary film ==
In 2020, García de Merlo became one of the protagonists of the documentary "Ellas". Directed by Pilar Monsell, it is inspired by the documentary "Vestida de azul" by the film director Antonio Giménez-Rico was presented at the San Sebastián International Film Festival in 1983 and that it reflected the reality of transgender women from a neutral point of view. For its part, Ellas showed the uneven life trajectory that five Spanish transsexual women of different generations have followed through a conversation moderated by the writer and documentary filmmaker Valeria Vegas. In addition to García de Merlo herself, the performer and activist Miryam Amaya, the multidisciplinary artist and makeup artist Alex Saint, and the protagonist of the Spanish television series "Veneno", Lola Rodríguez.
