= Ángeles Álvarez =

Spanish politician and feminist activist

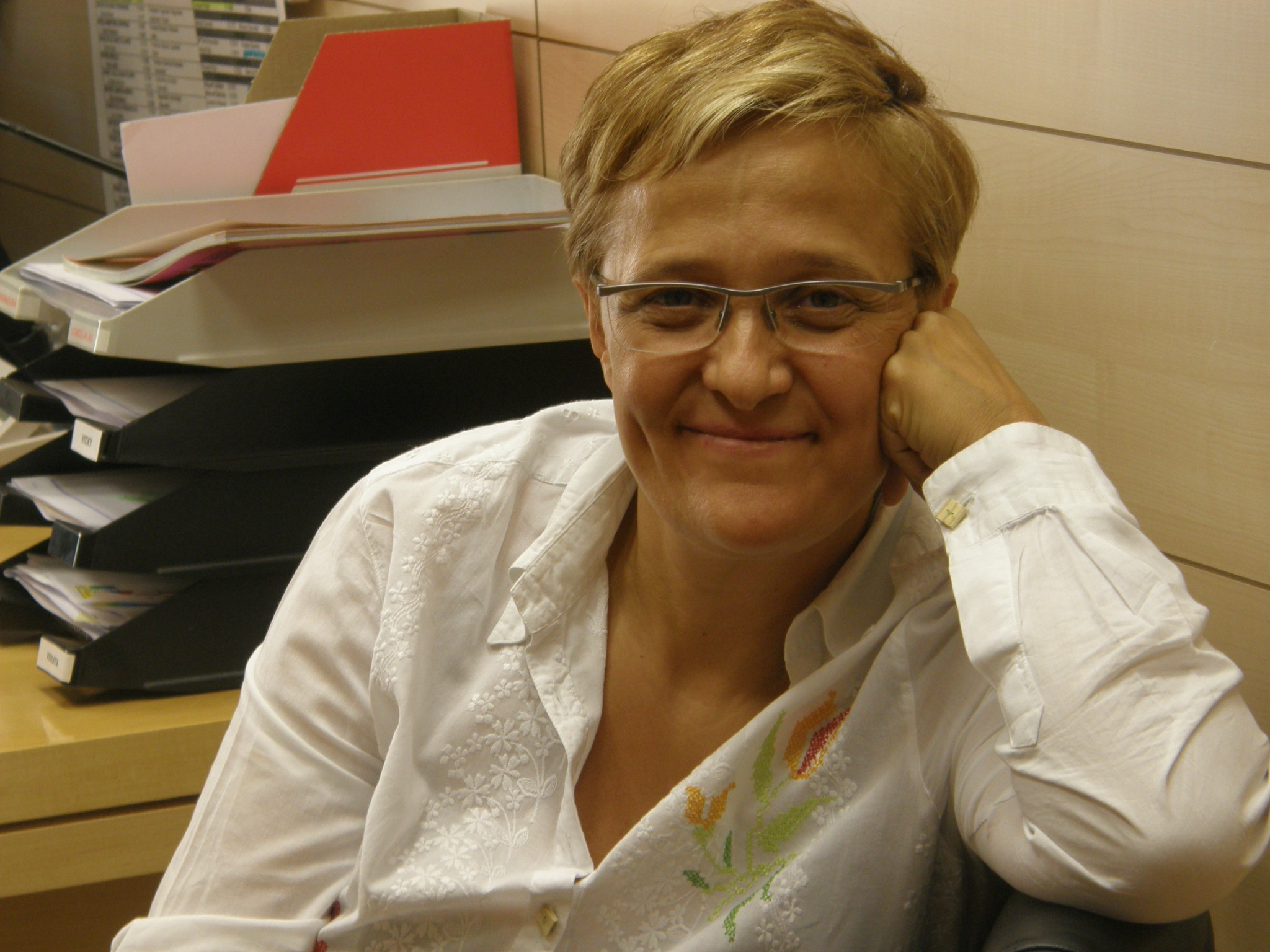
- Álvarez in 2007

Member of the Congress of Deputies
- In office 29 July 2016 – 21 May 2019
- In office 13 December 2011 – 11 January 2016
- Constituency: Madrid

Personal details
- Born: Ángeles Álvarez Álvarez; 12 February 1961 (age 65) Molacillos, Zamora, Spain
- Party: PSOE
- Spouse: Teresa Heredero (m. 2005)
- Occupation: Politician

Ángeles Álvarez (born 12 February 1961) is a Spanish politician and feminist activist. She served as a deputy for Madrid from 2011 to 2019. She was also a spokesperson for equality of the PSOE in the Congress of Deputies. She has a long history in defense of women's rights. In 1999, she was the author of a pioneering guide on gender violence.

Álvarez and Teresa Heredero were the first two lesbians to marry in Madrid in 2005 is a ceremony carried out by Pedro Zerolo. She was the first member of Cortes Generales to openly come out as lesbian in 2013.
