= Elsa Ruiz =

Spanish YouTuber

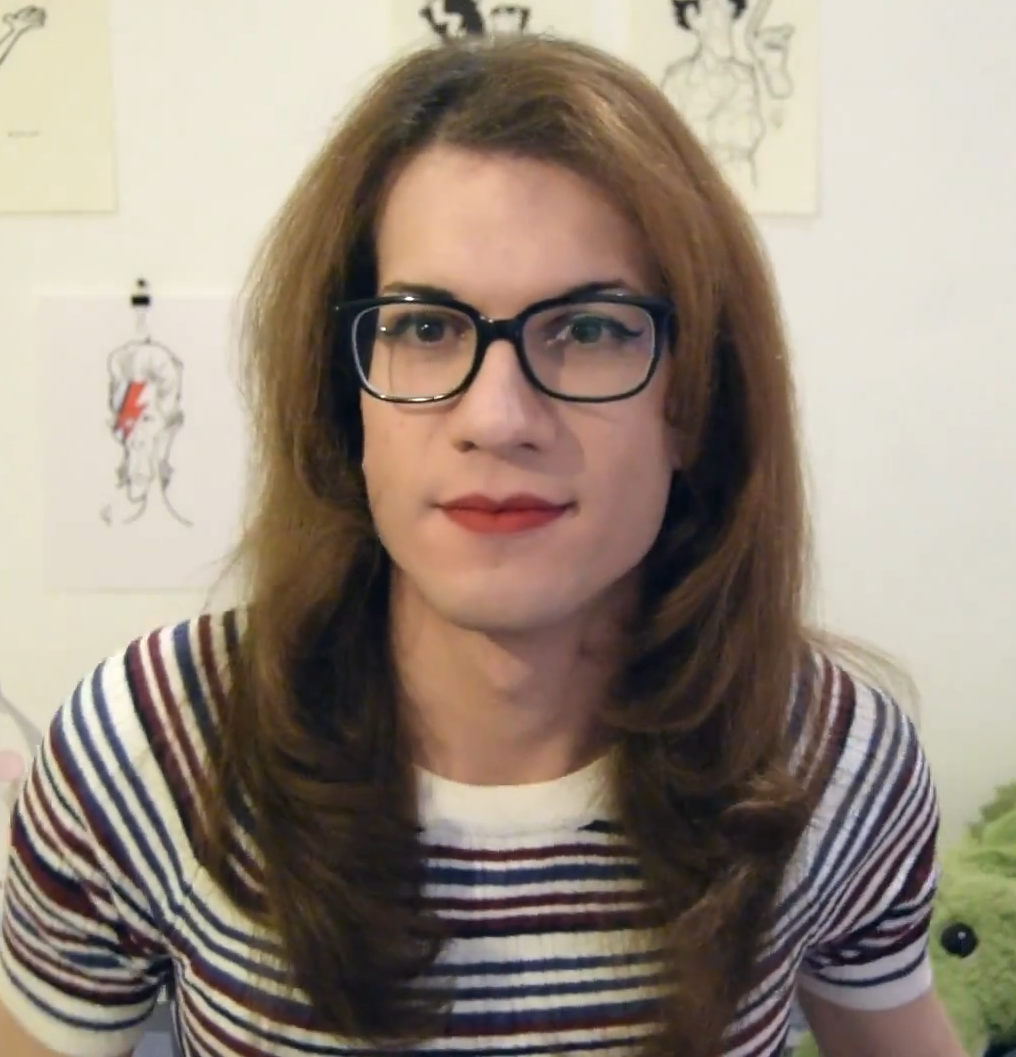
- Born: 2 March 1987 (age 39); Madrid, Spain
- Occupations: Comedian; illustrator; presenter

YouTube information
- Channel: Elsa Ruiz Cómica
- Years active: 2012–present
- Subscribers: 34,300
- Views: 2.69 million
- Last updated: 4 August 2026

Elsa Ruiz (Madrid, March 2, 1987) is a Spanish monologist, illustrator, and YouTuber who has worked with Spanish radio and television, as well as a feminist and trans activist.

== Trajectory ==
Ruiz, who began her career as a monologuist in the theater, is a comedian, illustrator, and contributor to television and radio, as well as a feminist and trans activist, both themes being very present in her monologues.

In 2017, she launched the YouTube channel, where she narrates, almost always with a humorous perspective, her experience as a trans woman and the reality of the LGTBI collective. She is also the creator of an online comic with the same name and goal, to make visible and bring closer the trans reality, as well as Mi pequeño Poni-Tico, a series of political comic strips starring ponies.

Subsequently, Elsa began working in radio, in programs such as Sun Days on EDM Radio, Tarde lo que tarde on RNE, and Vamos Tarde on Europa FM. In 2018, she jumped to television with a monologue in the program La resistencia on the Movistar+ platform. From January 2019 to March 2020, she was a contributor to the television program Todo es mentira on channel Cuatro.

She was one of the authors of the book (h)amor 6 trans, published in 2020.

== Awards ==
In 2020, Ruiz received the Triángulo Award from the COGAM and the Trans Association of Andalusia-Sylvia Rivera in recognition of her career and visibility.

In 2024, she received the CinemaTrans Activism Award.
