= 1995 Madrid municipal election =

Election in the Spanish municipality of Madrid

- 28 May 1995

All 55 seats in the City Council of Madrid 28 seats needed for a majority
- Opinion polls
- Registered: 2,529,476 ▲0.2%
- Turnout: 1,801,310 (71.2%) ▲12.0 pp

	First party	Second party	Third party
Leader	José María Álvarez del Manzano	Juan Barranco	Francisco Herrera
Party	PP	PSOE	IU
Leader since	10 October 1986	19 January 1986	7 June 1990
Last election	30 seats, 47.2%	21 seats, 34.3%	6 seats, 9.6%
Seats won	30	16	9
Seat change	0	▼5	▲3
Popular vote	945,634	499,435	279,090
Percentage	52.7%	27.8%	15.6%
Swing	▲5.5 pp	▼6.5 pp	▲6.0 pp
Mayor before election
José María Álvarez del Manzano
PP
Mayor after election
José María Álvarez del Manzano
PP

A municipal election was held in Madrid on 28 May 1995 to elect the 5th City Council of the municipality. All 55 seats in the City Council were up for election. It was held concurrently with regional elections in thirteen autonomous communities and local elections all across Spain.

People's Party (PP) incumbent José María Álvarez del Manzano again won an absolute majority of seats, improving his position relative to others as he obtained nearly 250,000 votes more than four years before. In contrast, the Spanish Socialist Workers' Party (PSOE) plummeted to one of its worst historical results, obtaining only 16 seats, to the benefit of United Left (IU) which scored its best result to date. Turnout was one of the highest in the history of the city, at 71.2%.

== Overview ==
Under the 1978 Constitution, the governance of municipalities in Spain—part of the country's local government system—was centered on the figure of city councils (Spanish: ayuntamientos), local corporations with independent legal personality composed of a mayor, a government council and an elected legislative assembly. The mayor was indirectly elected by the local assembly, requiring an absolute majority; otherwise, the candidate from the most-voted party automatically became mayor (ties were resolved by drawing lots). In the case of Madrid, the top-tier administrative and governing body was the City Council of Madrid.

=== Date ===
The term of local assemblies in Spain expired four years after the date of their previous election, with election day being fixed for the fourth Sunday of May every four years. The election decree was required to be issued no later than 54 days before the scheduled election date and published on the following day in the Official State Gazette (BOE). The previous local elections were held on 26 May 1991, setting the date for election day on the fourth Sunday of May four years later, which was 28 May 1995.

Local assemblies could not be dissolved before the expiration of their term, except in cases of mismanagement that seriously harmed the public interest and implied a breach of constitutional obligations, in which case the Council of Ministers could—optionally—decide to call a by-election.

Elections to the assemblies of local entities were officially called on 4 April 1995 with the publication of the corresponding decree in the BOE, setting election day for 28 May.

=== Electoral system ===
Voting for local assemblies was based on universal suffrage, comprising all Spanish nationals over 18 years of age, registered and residing in the municipality and with full political rights (provided that they had not been deprived of the right to vote by a final sentence, nor were legally incapacitated), as well as resident non-nationals whose country of origin allowed reciprocal voting by virtue of a treaty or within the framework of Community Law.

Local councillors were elected using the D'Hondt method and closed-list proportional voting, with a five percent-threshold of valid votes (including blank ballots) in each municipality. Each municipality was a multi-member constituency, with a number of seats based on the following scale:

Population	Councillors
<250	5
251–1,000	7
1,001–2,000	9
2,001–5,000	11
5,001–10,000	13
10,001–20,000	17
20,001–50,000	21
50,001–100,000	25
>100,001	+1 per each 100,000 inhabitants or fraction +1 if total is an even number

The law did not provide for by-elections to fill vacant seats; instead, any vacancies arising after the proclamation of candidates and during the legislative term were filled by the next candidates on the party lists or, when required, by designated substitutes.

== Parties and candidates ==
The electoral law allowed for parties and federations registered in the interior ministry, alliances and groupings of electors to present lists of candidates. Parties and federations intending to form an alliance were required to inform the relevant electoral commission within 10 days of the election call, whereas groupings of electors needed to secure the signature of a determined amount of the electors registered in the municipality for which they sought election, disallowing electors from signing for more than one list. In the case of Madrid, as its population was over 1,000,001, at least 8,000 signatures were required.

Below is a list of the main parties and alliances which contested the election:

Candidacy	Parties and alliances	Leading candidate	Ideology	Previous result		Gov.	Ref.
Candidacy	Parties and alliances	Leading candidate	Ideology	Vote %	Seats	Gov.	Ref.
PP	List: People's Party (PP)	José María Álvarez del Manzano	Conservatism; Christian democracy	47.2%	30	Yes	
PSOE	List: Spanish Socialist Workers' Party (PSOE)	Juan Barranco	Social democracy	34.3%	21	No	
IU	List: United Left of the Community of Madrid (IU) – Communist Party of Madrid (PCM) – Socialist Action Party (PASOC) – Republican Left (IR)	Francisco Herrera	Socialism; Communism	9.6%	6	No	

== Opinion polls ==
The tables below list opinion polling results in reverse chronological order, showing the most recent first and using the dates when the survey fieldwork was done, as opposed to the date of publication. Where the fieldwork dates are unknown, the date of publication is given instead. The highest percentage figure in each polling survey is displayed with its background shaded in the leading party's colour. If a tie ensues, this is applied to the figures with the highest percentages. The "Lead" column on the right shows the percentage-point difference between the parties with the highest percentages in a poll.

=== Voting intention estimates ===
The table below lists weighted voting intention estimates. Refusals are generally excluded from the party vote percentages, while question wording and the treatment of "don't know" responses and those not intending to vote may vary between polling organisations. When available, seat projections determined by the polling organisations are displayed below (or in place of) the percentages in a smaller font; 28 seats were required for an absolute majority in the City Council of Madrid (29 in the 1991 election).

Polling firm/Commissioner	Fieldwork date	Sample size	Turnout	PP	PSOE	IU	Lead
1995 municipal election	28 May 1995	—N/a	71.2	52.7; 30	27.8; 16	15.6; 9	24.9
Demoscopia/El País	10–15 May 1995	?	?	53.5; 31	22.9; 13	18.8; 11	30.6
CIS	24 Apr–10 May 1995	697	68.4	53.3	28.6	14.6	24.7
Sigma Dos/El Mundo	3–7 May 1995	?	?	53.4; 31	22.2; 12/13	20.3; 11/12	31.2
Gruppo/ABC	9–14 Feb 1995	400	?	51.8; 30/31	21.6; 12/13	21.4; 12/13	30.2
1994 EP election	12 Jun 1994	—N/a	61.4	53.9 (32)	22.4 (13)	17.6 (10)	31.5
1993 general election	6 Jun 1993	—N/a	79.6	47.8 (28)	32.0 (19)	13.7 (8)	15.8
1991 municipal election	26 May 1991	—N/a	59.2	47.2; 30	34.3; 21	9.7; 6	12.9

=== Voting preferences ===
The table below lists raw, unweighted voting preferences.

Polling firm/Commissioner	Fieldwork date	Sample size	PP	PSOE	IU	Question	X mark	Lead
1995 municipal election	28 May 1995	—N/a	37.4	19.7	11.0	—N/a	28.8	17.7
CIS	24 Apr–10 May 1995	697	32.3	25.2	14.3	16.2	9.1	7.1
1994 EP election (Note: Does not include non-resident citizens.)	12 Jun 1994	—N/a	33.0	13.7	10.8	—N/a	38.6	19.3
1993 general election	6 Jun 1993	—N/a	37.9	25.4	10.9	—N/a	20.4	12.5
1991 municipal election	26 May 1991	—N/a	27.8	20.2	5.7	—N/a	40.9	7.6

=== Preferred Mayor ===
The table below lists opinion polling on leader preferences to become mayor of Madrid.

Polling firm/Commissioner	Fieldwork date	Sample size			Other/ None/ Not care	Question	Lead
Polling firm/Commissioner	Fieldwork date	Sample size	Manzano PP	Barranco PSOE	Other/ None/ Not care	Question	Lead
CIS	24 Apr–10 May 1995	697	33.7	41.8	12.3	12.3	8.1

== Results ==
← Summary of the 28 May 1995 City Council of Madrid election results →
Parties and alliances	Popular vote			Seats	
Parties and alliances	Votes	%	±pp	Total	+/−
People's Party (PP)	945,634	52.71	+5.48	30	±0
Spanish Socialist Workers' Party (PSOE)	499,435	27.84	−6.47	16	−5
United Left (IU)	279,090	15.56	+5.84	9	+3
The Greens–Green Group (LV–GV)	13,013	0.73	New	0	±0
Platform of Independents of Spain (PIE)	11,734	0.65	New	0	±0
The Alternative Greens (LVA)^{1}	6,073	0.34	+0.05	0	±0
Madrilenian Independent Regional Party (PRIM)	2,228	0.12	−0.06	0	±0
Humanist Platform (PH)	1,450	0.08	New	0	±0
Spanish Phalanx of the CNSO (FE–JONS)	1,244	0.07	−0.06	0	±0
Revolutionary Workers' Party (POR)	1,097	0.06	±0.00	0	±0
Workers' Revolutionary Party (PRT)^{2}	622	0.03	−0.17	0	±0
Independent Spanish Phalanx (FEI)	615	0.03	−0.01	0	±0
Coalition for a New Socialist Party (NPS)^{3}	487	0.03	−0.02	0	±0
Blank ballots	31,467	1.75	+0.54		
Total	1,794,189			55	−2
Valid votes	1,794,189	99.60	−0.03		
Invalid votes	7,121	0.40	+0.03		
Votes cast / turnout	1,801,310	71.21	+12.06		
Abstentions	728,166	28.79	−12.06		
Registered voters	2,529,476				
Sources
Footnotes: ^{1} The Alternative Greens results are compared to Green Union totals in the 1991 election.; ^{2} Workers' Revolutionary Party results are compared to Workers' Socialist Party totals in the 1991 election.; ^{3} Coalition for a New Socialist Party results are compared to Alliance for the Republic totals in the 1991 election.

Popular vote
PP	52.71%
PSOE	27.84%
IU	15.56%
Others	2.15%
Blank ballots	1.75%

Seats
PP	54.55%
PSOE	29.09%
IU	16.36%

== Aftermath ==
=== Government formation ===
Investiture
Ballot →	17 June 1995	
Required majority →	28 out of 55	
José María Álvarez del Manzano (PP): • PP (30)	30 / 55	check
Juan Barranco (PSOE): • PSOE (16)	16 / 55	X mark
Francisco Herrera (IU): • IU (9)	9 / 55	X mark
Abstentions/Blank ballots	0 / 55	
Absentees	0 / 55	

== Bibliography ==
- Decreto 1674/1963, de 11 de julio, por el que se aprueba el texto articulado de la Ley que establece un régimen especial para el Municipio de Madrid (PDF) (Decree 1674/1963). Official State Gazette (in Spanish). 11 July 1963. BOE-A-1963-14593.
- Constitución Española (Constitution). Official State Gazette (in Spanish). 27 December 1978 [version as of 28 August 1992]. BOE-A-1978-31229.
- Ley 7/1985, de 2 de abril, Reguladora de las Bases del Régimen Local (Law 7/1985). Official State Gazette (in Spanish). 2 April 1985 [version as of 31 December 1994]. BOE-A-1985-5392.
- Ley Orgánica 5/1985, de 19 de junio, del Régimen Electoral General (Organic Law 5/1985). Official State Gazette (in Spanish). 19 June 1985 [version as of 24 March 1995]. BOE-A-1985-11672.
- Real Decreto 489/1995, de 3 de abril, de convocatoria de elecciones locales y a las Asambleas de Ceuta y Melilla (Royal Decree 489/1995). Official State Gazette (in Spanish). 3 April 1995. BOE-A-1995-8132.
