= Miryam Amaya =

Spanish activist and performance artist (born 1959)

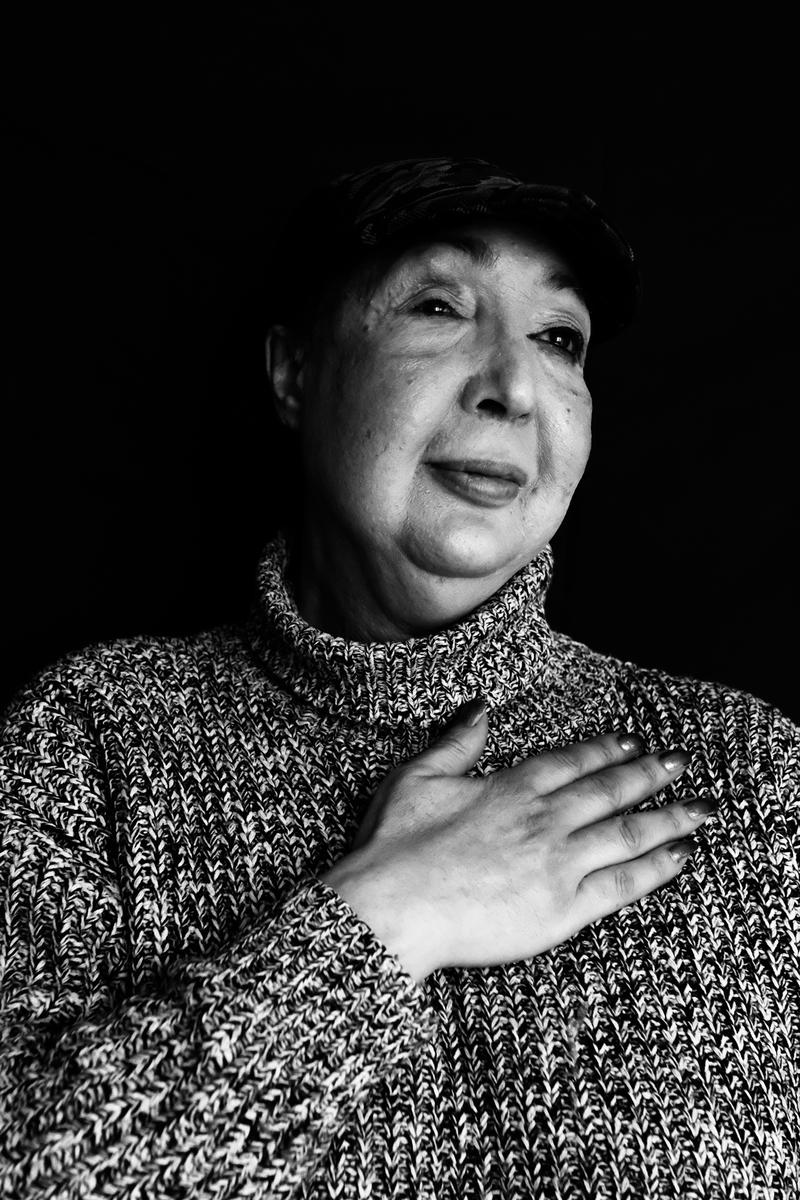
- Born: 1959 (age 66–67); Logrono, Spain
- Occupations: Transgender rights activist and performing artist

Miryam Amaya Jimenez (born 1959), also known as Miryam Alma, is a Spanish Romani LGBTQ rights activist and performance artist.

== Early life ==
Amaya was born in a stable in Logroño because her mother was tending to mares when she went into labor. Her family accepted her gender nonconformity from the beginning, so she felt very supported.

She grew up in Barcelona, a city where it was easy for her to get hormones without a prescription when she began treatment as a thirteen-year-old student. Although she studied Technical Drawing, she never practiced that profession.

== Activism and early career ==
From a very young age, she was aware of the need to fight for her rights as a trans woman and Roma, and had to deal with Francoist repression. She was detained several times in police stations where she was subjected to abuse and humiliation. She helped organize the first gay pride demonstration in Barcelona in 1977, a first for LGBTQ rights in Spain.

== Entertainment career ==
She dedicated herself to the entertainment world and prostitution. She was Miss Travesti Barcelona for several consecutive editions. She performed alongside Sara Montiel, met Pedro Almodovar and other figures of La Movida until a misdiagnosis caused her to lose sight in her right eye. For a time, she used narcotic substances until she quit with the help of her family. Almost all of her trans friends from that period did not survive.

== Contemporary activism ==
She exercises her activism to help women in vulnerable situations through collectives such as Somos LGTB+ Aragon, OMSida, or Centro Alba, with performances and talks about her experiences and denouncing the difficulties trans people face in obtaining decent work that provides them with a contributory pension in the future and to have the same rights as the rest of the citizenry. She directs the non-profit performance group The Babylons in the El Gancho neighborhood of Zaragoza.

=== Public speaking and events ===
In 2019, she was a protagonist, along with Montse Gonzalez and Marcela Rodriguez, in the event organized on November 20, on the occasion of the International Transgender Day of Remembrance by the Parliament of the Canary Islands, the State Secretariat for Equality of Treatment and Diversity, the Vice-Ministry of Equality and Diversity of the Government of the Canary Islands, and the State Federation of Lesbians, Gays, Trans and Bisexuals (FELGTB).

She was invited along with Kike Poveda and Quim Roqueta to the event organized by the State Federation of Lesbians, Gays, Trans and Bisexuals (FELGTB) to commemorate December 1, World AIDS Day, in 2019, whose motto was "Elders Without Closets: History, Struggle and Memory!" The event emphasized the Federation's demand to the Autonomous Communities to guarantee access for older people with HIV to residential centers.

She was one of the reference women who led the banner of the 2020 International Pride Day demonstration, which was virtual due to the COVID-19 pandemic under the slogan "Sorority and feminism to TRANSform. Lesbian, trans and bisexual women in action!".

== Media appearances ==
=== Literature ===
Her life story is told by journalist Raul Solis Galvan in his 2019 book, La doble transicion (The Double Transition), about eight transsexual women who conquered freedoms and rights in Spain, with a prologue by Monica Oltra.

=== Documentary ===
She is co-protagonist of the ATRESplayer PREMIUM documentary "Ellas" (Them) about the lives of five trans women along with Alex Saint, Lola Rodriguez, Carmen Garcia de Merlo, and the documentary's host Valeria Vegas, directed by Pilar Monsell and released in 2020. Through conversations, the protagonists share their lives, daily routines, achievements, problems, and struggles as trans women.

== Awards and recognition ==
- The Spanish Federation of Lesbians, Gays, Transsexuals and Bisexuals (FELGTB) awarded her the 2020 Plumas Prize for her work as an activist in the defense and visibility of the LGBTI community, stemming from her efforts in Zaragoza since March 2020, ensuring that dozens of trans women sex workers had economic support, social and housing assistance, and communication with their families. The gala was held exclusively online due to the Covid pandemic.
- In 2020, the Cartagena City Council honored the activist during the commemoration events for Pride Day 2020.
