= Plaza de Pedro Zerolo =

Public square in Madrid

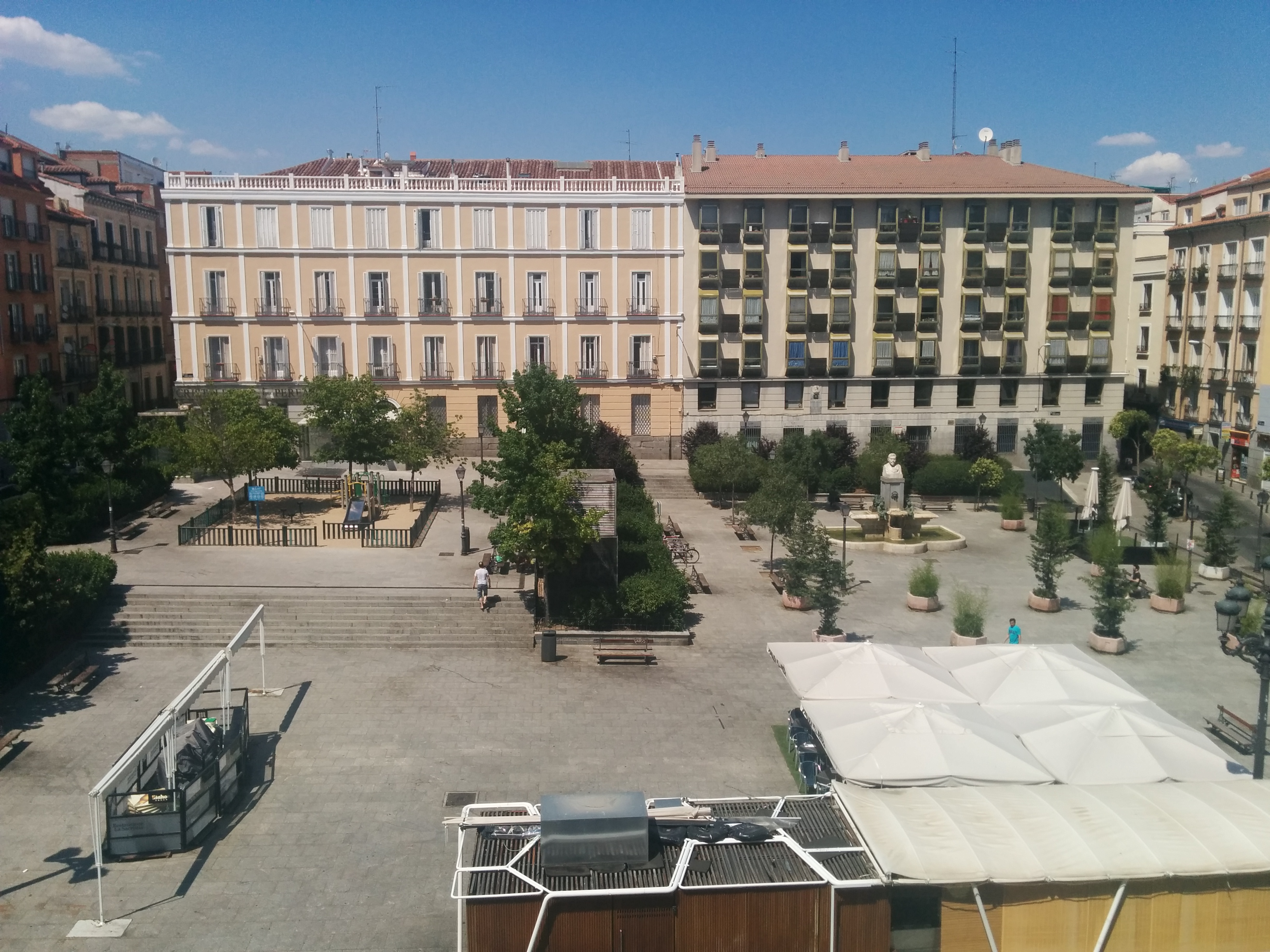
- Namesake: Pedro Zerolo
- Type: plaza
- Maintained by: Ayuntamiento of Madrid
- Location: Centro, Madrid, Spain
- Coordinates: 40.420976°N 3.69943°W

The plaza de Pedro Zerolo is a public square located in the centre of Madrid, Spain.

== History and description ==
It lies on the Centro District, most specifically in the administrative neighborhood of Justicia. It is considered part of Chueca.

It was created around 1836, as the plot formerly occupied by the convent of Capuchinos de la Paciencia was planted with elms and acacias. The square, known as the "plaza de Bilbao", was populated in the 1860s with conifers and magnolias.

In 1931, in order to avoid the repetition of placenames, the square was renamed to "plaza de Manuel Ruiz Zorrilla", in honor of the noted republican politician.

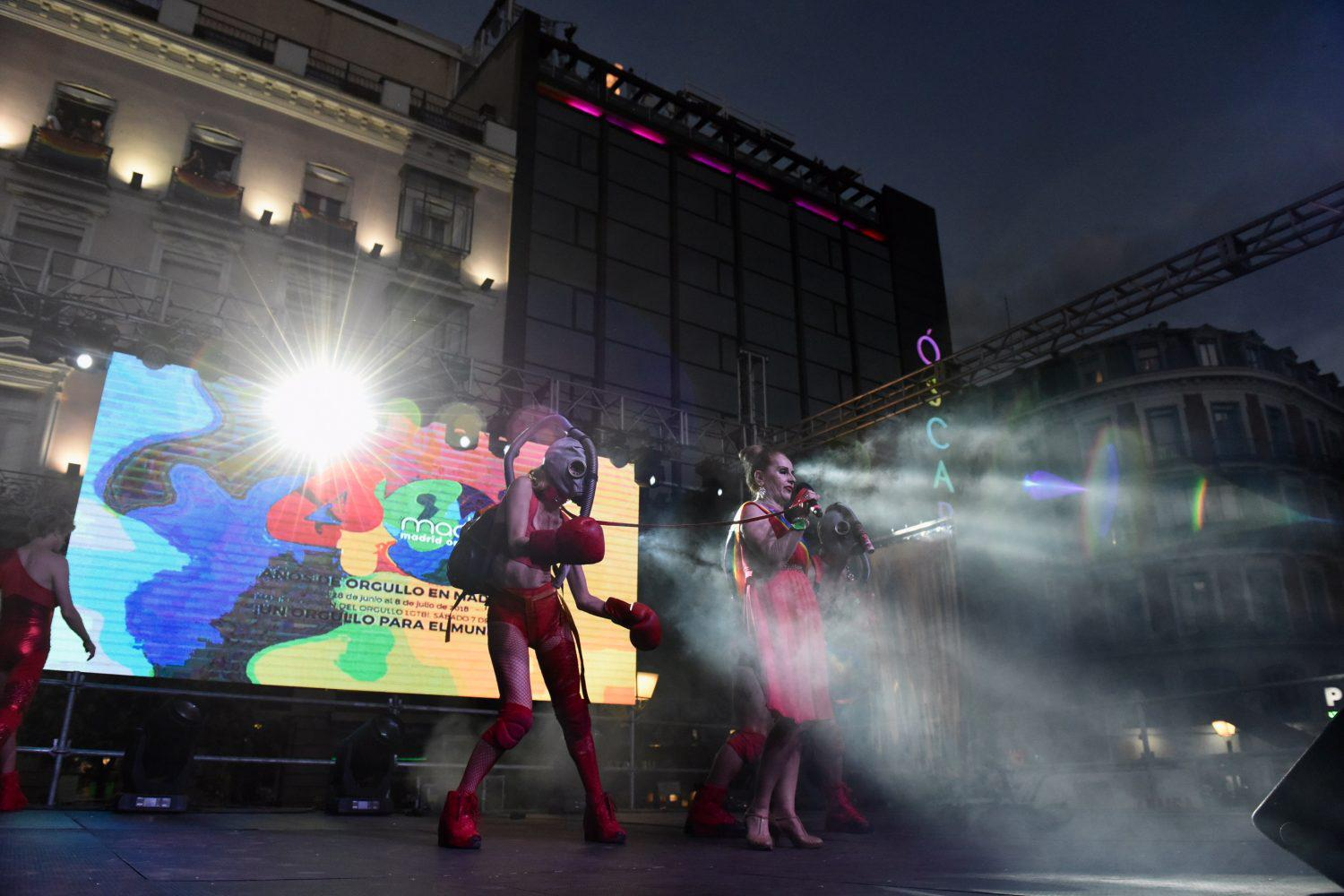
The square, located in Chueca, the "LGBT quarter" of Madrid, was chosen as location for the kickstart of the 2018 Madrid Pride.

Following the end of the Civil War in 1939, the new Francoist administration toyed with the idea of renaming the square after Onésimo Redondo (a Fascist politician who had died in the war) or using the name of "Capuchinos de la Paciencia" (in a nod to the predecessor of the square), but in 1940 the authorities ruled the reset of the name to "plaza de Bilbao". Some years later, in 1944, the city council decided to rename the space as "plaza de Vázquez de Mella", after the Carlist ideologist Juan Vázquez de Mella. In order to inaugurate the new name of the square, a fountain topped by a bust of the far right politician was unveiled on 24 July 1946. As a parking lot was built in the square in 1950, the fountain was moved first to the Paseo del Prado and then to the neighbouring Plaza de la Platería de Martínez, only to return to the plaza de Vázquez de Mella after 1999, when the square was reformed as the surface parking lot was demolished with a new underground parking lot being built instead.

The plenary of the Ayuntamiento de Madrid approved the change of name of the square to "plaza de Pedro Zerolo" on 24 July 2015, with the yes votes of Ahora Madrid, PSOE and Citizens, and the vote against of the People's Party. The new name paid homage to the LGBT activist and former PSOE councillor Pedro Zerolo, died in June 2015 from pancreatic cancer. The rename was decreed by the Junta de Gobierno on 28 January 2016. with the unveiling of the new square signs taking place on 15 May 2016.
