= José María Mendiluce =

Spanish politician and writer

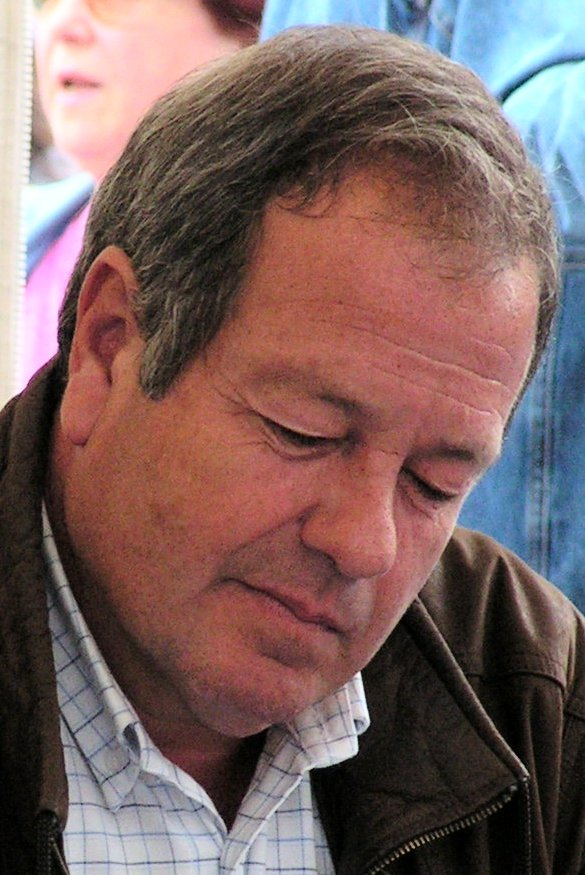
- Pereiro in 2006
- Born: José María Mendiluce Pereiro; 14 April 1951; Madrid, Spain
- Died: 28 November 2015 (aged 64); Barcelona, Catalonia, Spain
- Education: Complutense University of Madrid
- Occupations: Writer; politician
- Years active: 1994–2015

José María Mendiluce Pereiro (14 April 1951 – 28 November 2015) was a Spanish writer and politician. Born in Madrid, he attended Complutense University in his hometown.

== Career ==
He was awarded the Creu de Sant Jordi in 1996 and the second prize of the Premio Planeta de Novela two years later. Mendiluce represented Spain as a Member of the European Parliament from 1994 to 2004, but before worked in Yugoslavia as a representative of United Nations during the civil war.

== Personal life ==
He came out as gay in 2003, and died in 2015.
