= Pedro Zerolo =

Spanish lawyer and politician

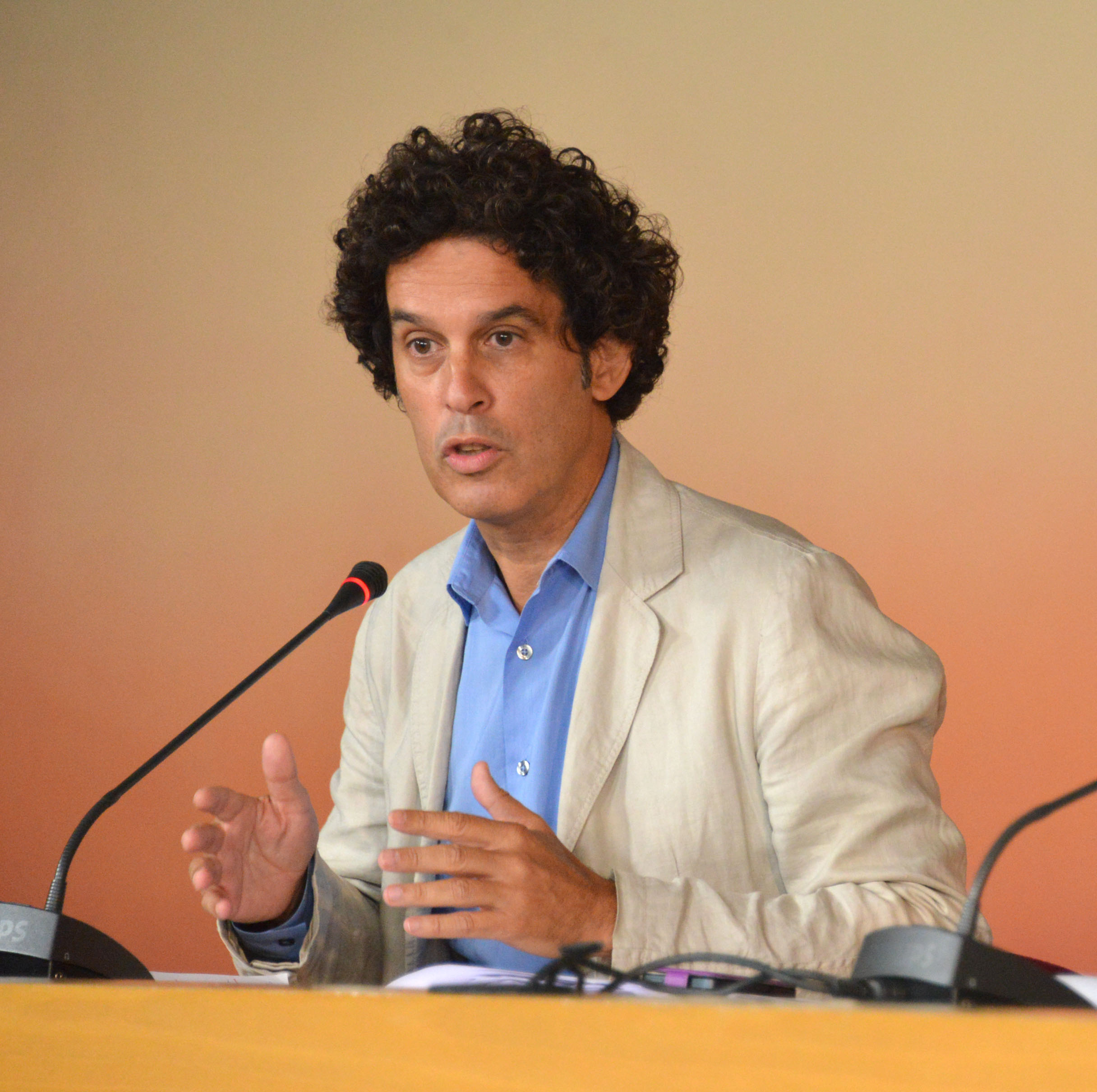
Pedro Zerolo (2013).

Pedro González Zerolo (20 July 1960 in Caracas – 9 June 2015 in Madrid) was a Spanish-Venezuelan lawyer, politician and a town councillor of the city of Madrid, and a member of the Federal Executive Committee of the PSOE where he held the position of Secretary for Social Movements and Relations with NGOs. He was also a trustee of the Fundacion IDEAS, Spain's Socialist Party's think tank.

Zerolo was also one of the most important LGBT activists in Spanish history and one of the biggest promoters of extending the right to marriage and adoption to homosexual couples in the country. Zerolo has become a gay icon among the Spanish LGBT community.

== Biography ==
Zerolo was born in Caracas, Venezuela, to a family native to the island of Tenerife, one of Canary Islands. His father, Pedro González, lived in exile from the Francoist government there. Pedro González was the first mayor of San Cristóbal de La Laguna (Tenerife) in times of democracy and also well-known painter.

Pedro Zerolo went on to study law at the University of La Laguna on Tenerife, where he spent his childhood and adolescence. After gaining his diploma, he moved to Madrid, where he continued his studies, focusing on comparative law. At the same time, he collaborated with Catholic priest Enrique de Castro in a project to help the people of the poor Madrid barrio of Entrevías.

Through his work with law and politics, he went on to become one of the most well-known activists for the LGBT movement in fighting for marriage equality in Spain.

On 1 October 2005, Zerolo married Jesús Santos, his partner of ten years, in a civil ceremony. In the same year he officiated in the marriage of politician Ángeles Álvarez and Teresa Heredero who became the first two lesbians to marry in Madrid.

At the age of 55, Zerolo died from pancreatic cancer on 9 June 2015 in Madrid.

=== Professional career ===
Pedro Zerolo worked as both a lawyer and a politician throughout his professional career. In 1992, he became a legal consultant for the Colectivo Gay de Madrid (Gay Collective of Madrid, COGAM). In late 1993, he was elected president of the organization. He subsequently provided legal assistance to the Federación Estatal de Lesbianas, Gays, Transexuales y Bisexuales (National Federation of Lesbians, Gays, Transsexuals and Bisexuals, FELGTB). In 1998 he became president of that organization FELGTB. He was reelected in 2000 and 2002.

In 2001 and 2003 he participated in negotiations between opposition and the government deputies over five modifications to the Spanish Civil Code relating to same-sex marriage.

In 2004 he joined the board of directors of the International Lesbian and Gay Association. Also in 2004, he resigned as the president of the FELGTB after being elected to the Federal Executive Committee of as a councilman for the City of Madrid by the Spanish Socialist Workers' Party (PSOE). He was head of the Secretariat of Social Movements and Relations with NGOs in both the 36th and 37th Congress. Until the 38th Congress in 2012, where he was elected to new executive of PSOE. Throughout his work with the Socialist Party he was able to support and defend LGBT rights in the Congress of Deputies. Zerolo addressed the Spanish Congress of Deputies during the debate over civil partnerships. He also appeared in the Spanish Senate to denounce discrimination against the gay community in Spain.

=== Tributes to Pedro Zerolo ===
On 11 December 2015, Radio Club Tenerife Cadena Ser granted him the "Teide de Oro Award" posthumously.

In July 2015 the City Council of Madrid decided to change the name of the Plaza de Vázquez de Mella to the Plaza de Pedro Zerolo in honor of him. The plaza was inaugurated on 14 May 2016 in the Madrid neighborhood of Chueca. The mayor of Madrid, Manuela Carmena; General Secretary of the PSOE, Pedro Sánchez; the General Secretary of the PSOE-Madrid, Sara Hernández; and members of the LGBTI collective were all present at the inauguration.

Other dedications such as a square in the south of Tenerife in the Villa de Adeje, and a garden by Elche (province of Alicante) were honored in his name.

Malaga, Murcia and San Cristóbal de La Laguna in Tenerife have plans to dedicate either squares or streets in his name. Lastly, Alcázar de San Juan plans to dedicate an open-air theater in his honor as well.

The Cabildo de Tenerife declared Pedro Zerolo Illustrious Son of Tenerife on 14 June 2019.

June 26, 2025 Riba-Roja de Turia unveiled the Passeig de Pedro Zerolo in honor of their first pride event.
