= Molacillos =

Coordinates: 41°35′N 5°39′W

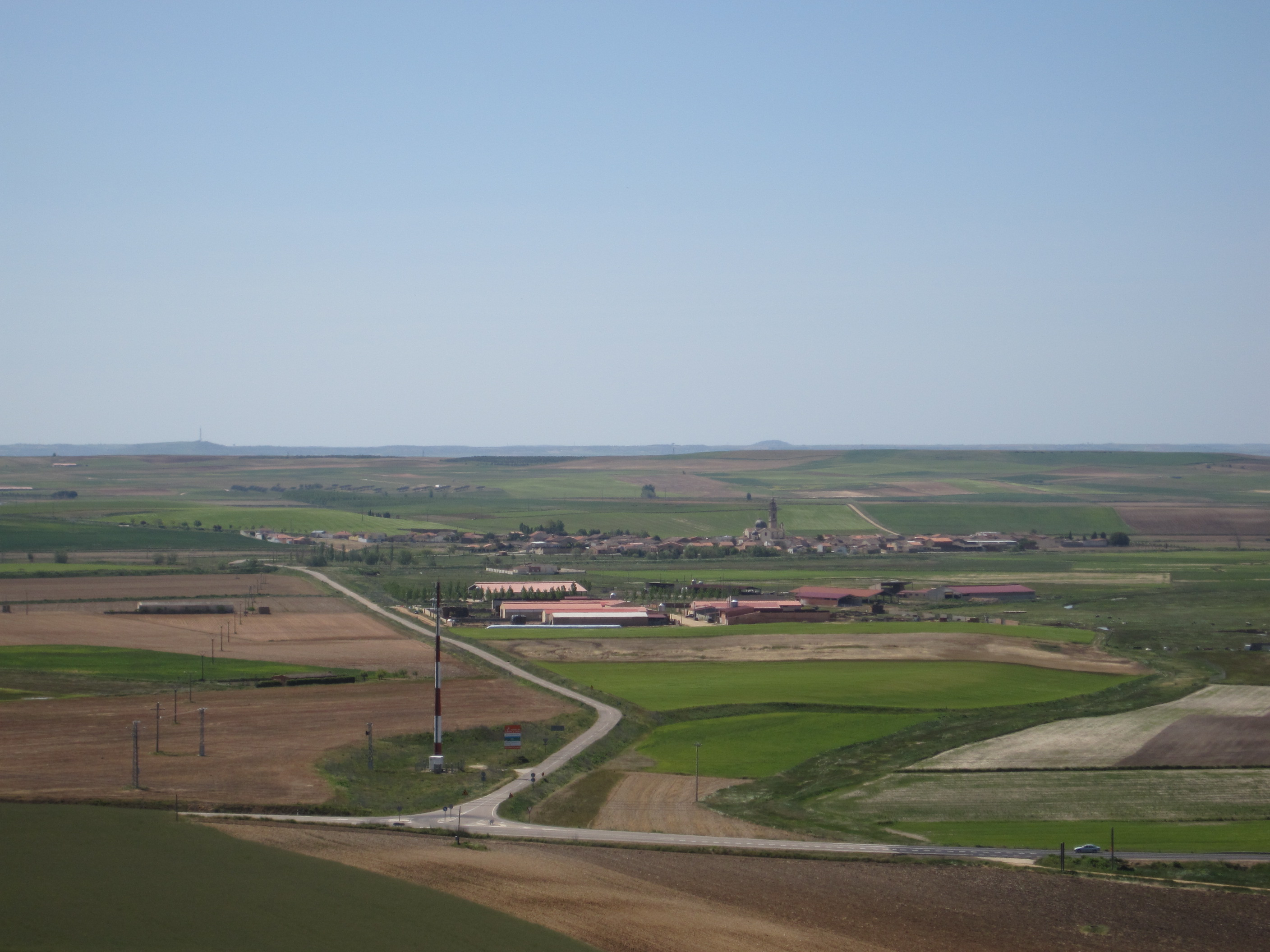
- Interactive map of Molacillos
- Country: Spain
- Autonomous community: Castile and León
- Province: Zamora
- Municipality: Molacillos

Area
  - Total: 23 km^{2} (8.9 sq mi)

Population (2025-01-01)
  - Total: 223
  - Density: 9.7/km^{2} (25/sq mi)
- Time zone: UTC+1 (CET)
  - Summer (DST): UTC+2 (CEST)
- Climate: BSk

Molacillos is a municipality located in the province of Zamora, Castile and León, Spain. According to the 2004 census (INE), the municipality has a population of 286 inhabitants.
