= Iñigo Lamarca =

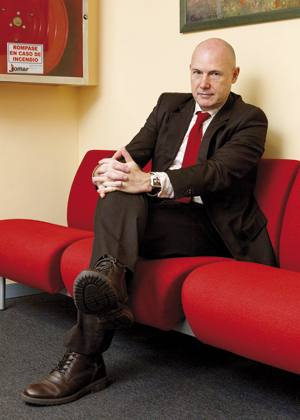
- Iturbe in 2012
- Born: Íñigo Lamarca Iturbe; 13 July 1959 (age 66); San Sebastián, Euskadi, Spain
- Occupations: Lawyer; professor

Íñigo Lamarca Iturbe (born 13 July 1959) is a Spanish lawyer and served as Ararteko (Ombudsman), of the Basque Country between 2004 and 2014. He previously served as president of GEHITU, and is the first gay man to hold the office.

== Life ==
He was professor of Constitutional Law of the University of the Basque Country, from 1984 to 1994. He specialized in subjects of Basque public law. In May 1994, he joined the Guipúzcoa General Meeting, where he was in the position of special services.

He has been a prominent activist of the LGTB movement, both in the Basque Country and as founder and president of the Basque Country Gay and Lesbian Association (GEHITU, unite) and the State Federation of Lesbian, Gay, Transsexual and Bisexual (FELGTB).

He was professor of Basque in AEK, of the Basque language Rikardo Arregi and of the School of Magisterium of the Diocese of San Sebastián . He was a member of the Euskal Kultur Mintegia (EKM) of the University of Deusto and the Commission for the Basque university district. He was a member of the ESEI (Euskal Sozialistak Elkartzeko Indarra) political party . Collaborated in the magazine Zeruko Argia .

He was elected on 18 July 2004, after a long period in which the post remained vacant, and was re-elected on 8 October 2009, being the first to be re-elected to the post. His mandate expired on 15 October 2014 and, after a period of vacancy during which Julia Hernando served as Ararteko, on 28 of May 2015, she was replaced in office by the Bilbao jurist Manu Lezertua.
