= Inés Sabanés =

Spanish politician

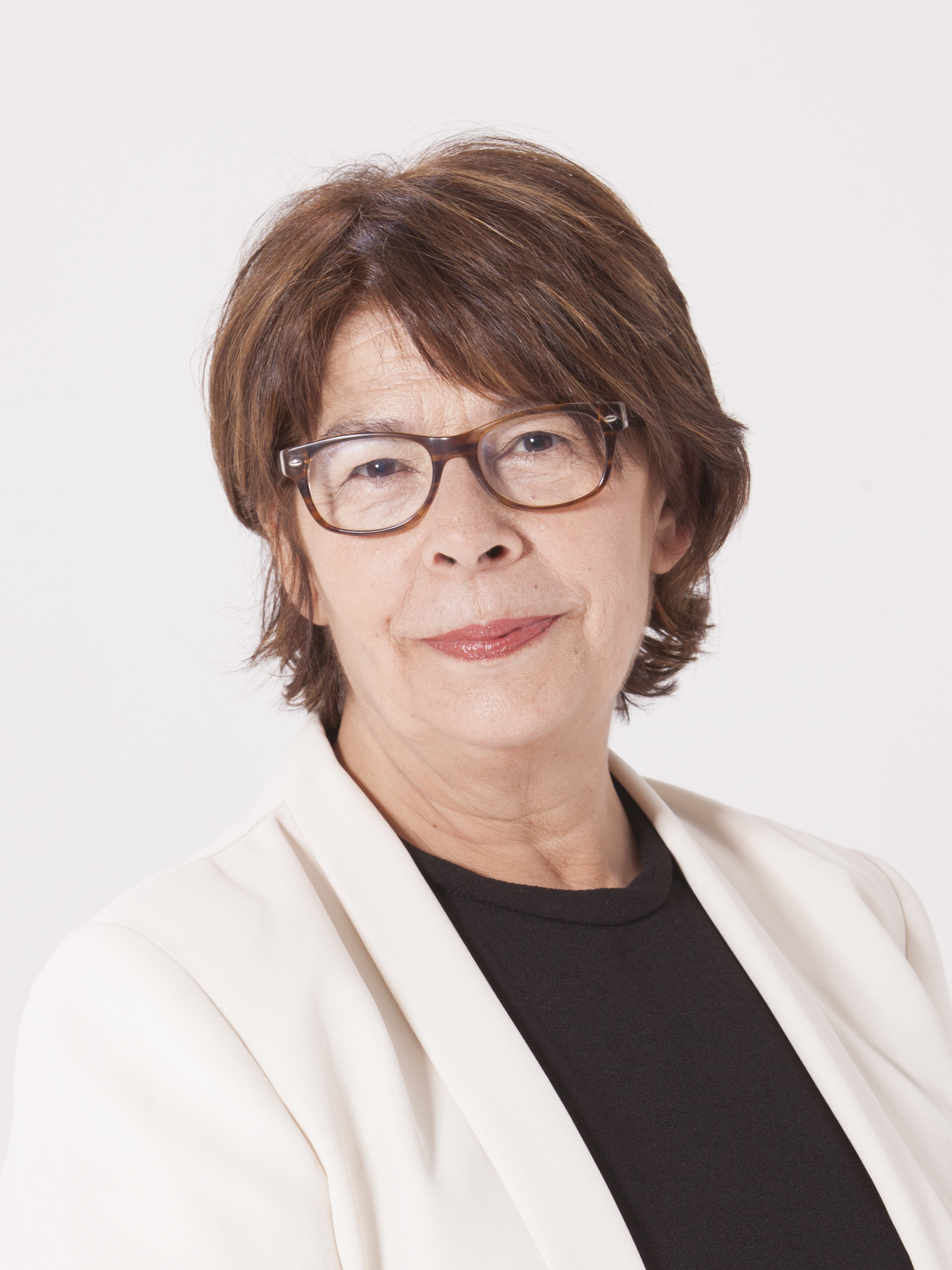

Member of the Congress of Deputies
- In office 3 December 2019 – 17 August 2023
- Constituency: Madrid

Madrid municipal councillor
- In office 13 June 2015 – 20 December 2019

Member of the Assembly of Madrid
- In office 12 June 2007 – 29 March 2011

Madrid municipal councillor
- In office June 1999 – June 2007

Member of the Congress of Deputies
- In office 25 March 1996 – 3 September 1999
- Constituency: Madrid

Personal details
- Born: 24 June 1953; Cubells, Catalonia, Spain
- Citizenship: Spanish
- Political party: PASOC (1982–2001); IU (1986–2011); Equo (since 2011)
- Occupation: Politician, civil servant, handballer

Inés Sabanés Nadal (born 1953) is a Spanish eco-socialist politician. She served as Madrid's Councillor for the Environment and Mobility from 2015 to 2019.

== Biography ==
Born on 24 June 1953 in Cubells, province of Lleida. She moved to Madrid to study at the National Institute for Physical Education (now part of the Technical University of Madrid). She played for the Women's Handball section of Atlético Madrid, as well as for the handball national team.

Sabanés, who had become a member of the Unión General de Trabajadores (UGT) and the Socialist Action Party (PASOC) in 1982, was a founding member of the United Left in 1986. A resident in Vallecas, she became a civil servant of the Madrid City Council in 1986, and she worked in the Municipal Sports Institute until 1996.

She ran sixth in the IU list in Madrid for the 1996 general election and became a member of the Spanish lower house, in what it was her first elected office. She left her seat in September 1999, as she had successfully ran as candidate in the 1999 municipal election in Madrid and had become city councillor. Following the decision of the PASOC party to unlink from the IU federation in 2001, Sabanés and fellow PASOC colleague Franco González decided to remain in IU. She renovated her seat as city councillor following the 2003 municipal election for the 2003–2007 term.

She led the IU list for the 2007 Madrilenian regional election, becoming a member of the 8th term of the regional legislature, as well as the Spokesperson of the parliamentary group. She was removed from the later post in December 2009 and was replaced by Gregorio Gordo. Gradually distanced from the IU board, Sabanés left IU and joined Equo in June 2011. She also returned to her post as civil servant in the city council.

She ran third in the Ahora Madrid list for the 2015 Madrid municipal election. Sabanés became city councillor for another spell and, as member of the municipal government board presided by Manuela Carmena, she has served as councillor of Environment and Mobility of the corporation during the 2015–2019 term, in which she promoted Madrid Central, a plan for a new range of inner-city traffic restrictions as well as the "re-naturalization" of the Manzanares river, opening the locks impounding the stream along its watercourse.

Standing up for reelection at the May 2019 Madrid municipal election under the Más Madrid banner, she renovated her seat as municipal councillor, switching to the opposition following the investiture of PP's José Luis Martínez-Almeida as new mayor in June 2019.

Sabanés ran 3rd in the list of the Más País–Equo list in Madrid for the Congress of Deputies led by Íñigo Errejón vis-à-vis the November 2019 Spanish general election. The coalition only earned 2 MPs at the election, but, following the renouncement of Marta Higueras (number 2) to assume office, Sabanés did so, becoming a legislator since the beginning of the legislative term on 3 December 2019. Later in December she left her seat of city councillor. The municipal government of PP and Citizens made the most of the gap until her successor (Mar Barberán) took office, passing the annual budget in a controversial action that spearheaded the absence en bloc of the opposition councillors during the vote as sign of protest.

Equo members elected Sabanés as Federal Co-Spokesperson of the party along Florent Marcellesi in February 2020.

Political offices
Preceded by Diego Sanjuanbenito	Madrid's Delegate of Environment and Mobility; 13 June 2015 – 15 June 2019	Succeeded by
Business positions
Preceded by Ana Botella	Chairwoman of the Empresa Municipal de Transportes de Madrid, S. A. 2015 – 2019	Succeeded by
