= COGAM =

Spanish non-governmental association

- Type: LGBT rights organization Anti-LGBT violence Non-profit; Interest group
- Founded: 1986
- Headquarters: Madrid, Spain
- Key people: Pedro Zerolo; Boti García Rodrigo current president Carmen García de Merlo
- Website: www.cogam.org www.cogam.es

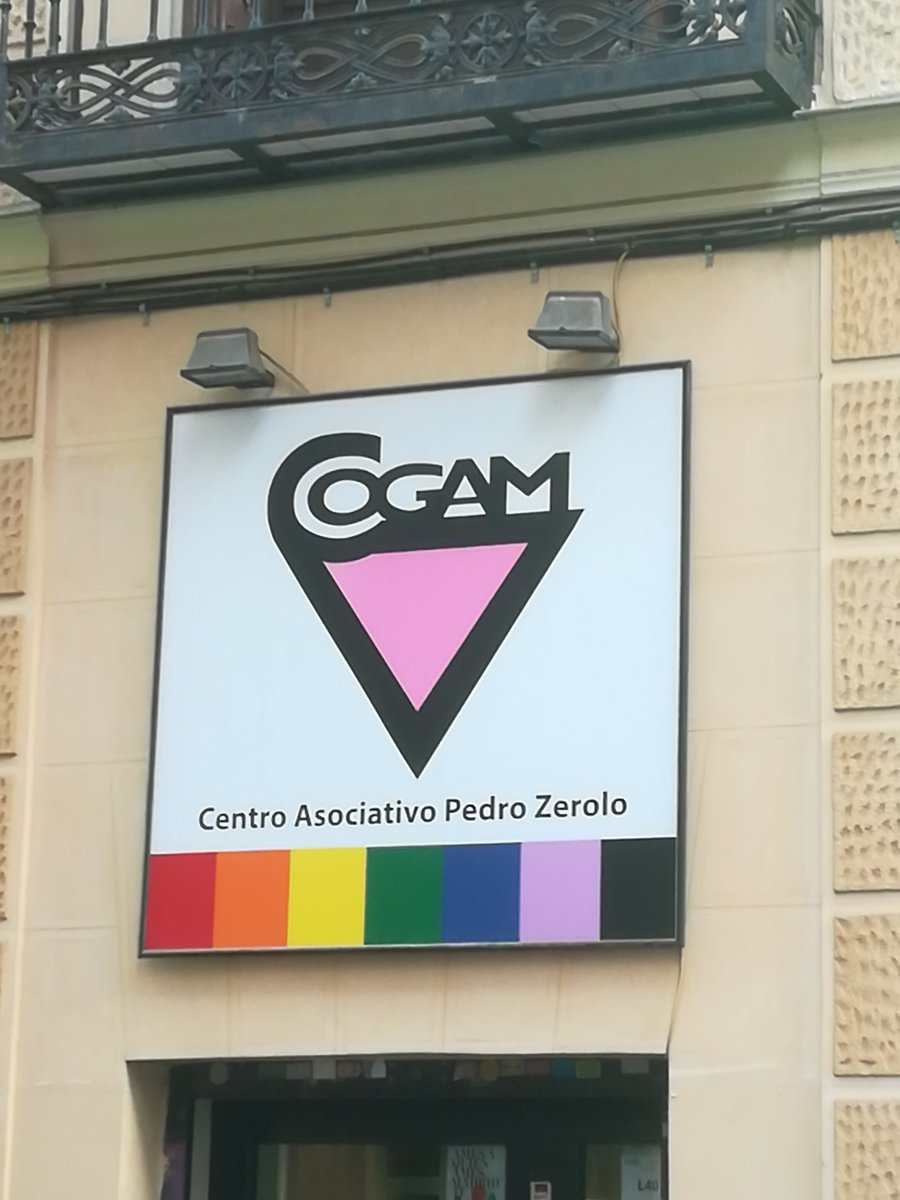

Lesbians, Gays, Transsexuals and Bisexuals Collective Organization (Spanish: Colectivo de Lesbianas, Gays, Transexuales y Bisexuales de Madrid; COGAM) is a Spanish non-governmental association stated as a public utility and non-profit organization in Boletín Oficial del Estado which works actively for the rights of lesbians, gays, transsexuals and bisexuals. It is located in the surroundings of Chueca quarter in Madrid.

COGAM worked for the same-sex marriage in Spain, the Spanish gender identity law, and the organization of the Madrid Gay Parade (as well the Europride 2007) and World Pride 2017

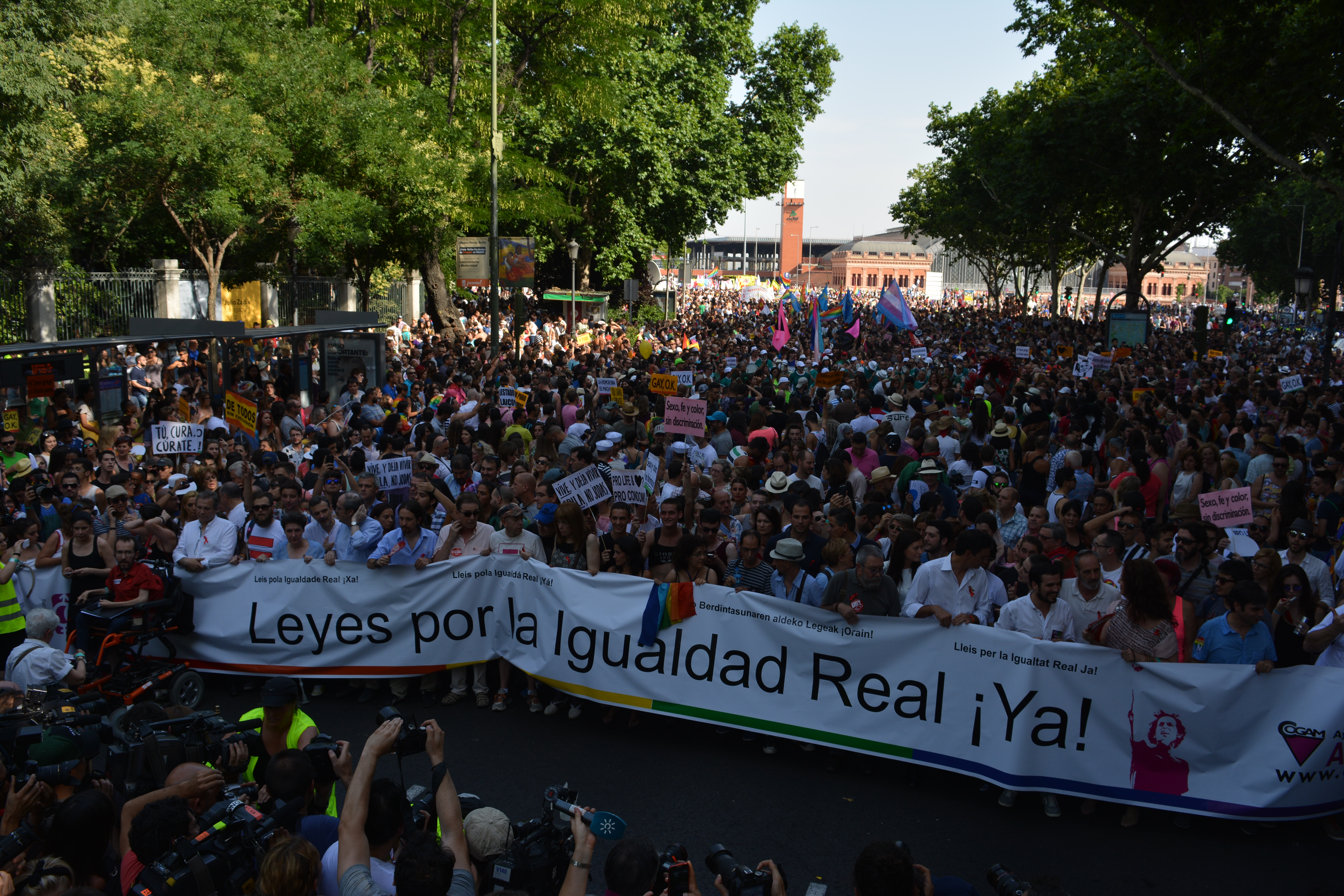
A demonstration in Madrid in July 2015, partly formed by COGAM, under the slogan "Laws for real equality NOW!"

== History ==
COGAM was born in Madrid as a result of Coordinadora de Frentes de Liberación Homosexual del Estado Español's meeting (COFLHEE). In 1988 an Antidiscriminatory project was proposed to COFLHEE (and accepted) with the inalienable demands that, to its judgment, the political parties should assume. From its initial revolutionary propositions COGAM is evolving towards more moderate and positive politics; as a result, it resulted in the leaving of COFLHEE due to be considered too radical. It meant the split of COGAM itself. one of its members established Radical Gay, an anti-establishment, combative group against the Catholic Church. In 1992 COGAM promoted the establishment of the Estate's Federation of Gays and Lesbians (FEGL), which later on will become FELGT. In 1993 it put forward a "Couples'" Bill and signed with Madrid's Community the first stable agreement supporting COGAM's activities. In 1996 COGAM suffered a new split (as a result Fundación Triángulo comes to light).

== Publications ==
In 1987 the bimonthly magazine "Entiendes…?" starts being published, run by Pedro Antonio Pérez. At the end of 1997 and beginning of 1998, thanks to the collaboration of Centro Nacional de Epidemiología, Instituto de Salud Carlos III, the Secretary of Plan Nacional del SIDA and COGAM, one of the most important studies about sexual behavioural risks as well as the use of prevention measures to avoid infection by VIH (4) was done among the magazine readers.

== Debates ==
COGAM has been present in all the debates and demands regarding to LGBT's rights. Its actions and statements have often caused controversy in conservative media, as its criticism to the Vatican or its campaign in favor of the renunciation of the Catholic faith.

COGAM has been often criticized from different fields of Spain's gay movement itself as promoters of a type of gay culture mercantilization within the context of the so-called "peseta rosa" o "euro rosa". During the "XIX Encuentros Estatales LGBT" held in 2007 and where 47 associations, including COGAM, attended, it was approved to develop an ethical behavioural code to be applied to LGBT's associations' conduct with private corporations.

== Activities ==
The aims of this association, as its statutes show, are as follows:

- The defense of Human Rights collected in United Nations Bill and in a special way of those rights referred to lesbians, gays, transsexuals and bisexuals, rights to their dignity as human beings, to the free development of their personality, to the search of social equality, the elimination of discrimination, etc.
- To work for a more plural and respectful society promoting social conditions so that freedom and equality of the different groups' members as well as those of people become real and effective.
- To promote fully legal and social equality of all individuals, irrelevant of their sexual orientation or identity, as well as of their affective and sexual relations they may have with other people's fullest consent.
- To promote the elimination of any homophobic or transfobic behaviour.
- To promote the elimination of any discrimination related to people infected with VIH. Public and free medical and psychological assistance rights for all seropositive people.

The activities developed from COGAM, generically addressed to LGTB group, are:

Activities directed to cover psychological and social needs:

- "SOS Homo-Transphobia": National help service to LGTB victims of homophobic or transfobic causes, helping the victims to file the legal report.
- Welcome: First attention contact through a customized interview where reciprocal information is exchanged between the professional and LGTB's member.
- Information, orientation and counselling.
- Treatment and follow-up.
- Direct telephone attention.
- Preparation of educational training material.
- Resources development for lesbians, gays, transsexuals and bisexuals.
- Gathering of statistical data.
- Development of monographic Work Groups: gays, lesbians, transsexuals, bisexuals, elderly, deaf people, mothers, fathers, "coming out", VIH, etc.
- Training activities.
- Studies of "popular" and technical activity which, from the psychological field, deal with homosexuality as well as transsexuality.

Activities related to cover legal, educational, cultural, health and sports needs:

- Information, guidance and counseling services for individuals, entities or corporations.
- Development of informative and training material.
- Training activities.
- Coordination between public services
- Guidance to individuals and organizations that from an educational frame deal with the subject of homosexuality and transsexuality.
- Other activities of similar nature.

== Groups, work commissions and services ==
COGAM work groups and commissions draw together members with similar interests, which range from the social compromise (Human Rights Commission, Educational Commission, Parents Commission) to the practice of sports or the development of cultural activities.

Among the annual and usual activities, there are the LGTB Pride demonstration organization as well as various activities involved in such an event (organized by COGAM and FELGT), the annual lesbian Photolés photography touring exhibition and the events of the AIDS World Day held in Madrid.

== Other related associations ==
- Member of the Federación Estatal de Lesbianas, Gays y Transexuales (FELGT).
- Member of the International Lesbian and Gay Association (ILGA).
- Member of Madrid's Community Youth Counsel (Consejo de la Juventud de la Comunidad de Madrid).
- Member of the Federación de Asociaciones de SIDA de Madrid (MAS MADRID) and the Coordinadora Estatal de SIDA (CESIDA).

== See also ==
- LGBT rights in Spain
- List of LGBT rights organizations

== Sources ==
- COGAM declarada de Utilidad Pública, en referencia al artículo 32 de la Ley Orgánica 1/2002, de 22 de marzo, reguladora del Derecho de Asociación en BOE núm. 73, de 26-3-2002 y de la Utilidad Pública
- Historia del movimiento lésbico y gay en España, dossier de la Fundación Triángulo
- Entrevista con Boti García Rodrigo, presidenta del COGAM
