= José María Álvarez del Manzano =

Spanish politician

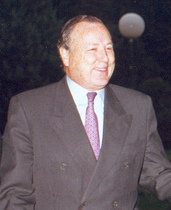
José María Álvarez del Manzano

José María Álvarez del Manzano y López del Hierro (born 17 October 1937) is a Spanish politician for the People's Party. Although born in Seville he has lived in Madrid since he was 3 years old. He studied at the Jesuit Colegio Nuestra Señora del Recuerdo. He became the Mayor of Madrid in 1991, a position that he held until 2003. He chaired the board of IFEMA (Institute for Exhibitions and Fairs Madrid) for 24 years, until 2015. He is married to María Eulalia Miró Ramírez and has four children.

Under his government the idea of the nomination of Madrid as host city for the 2012 Olympic Games was launched. 28 tunnels were built crossing the city from below. His government left both many trenches as well as many unresolved problems such as street prostitution, traffic chaos and rising housing prices. He was also remembered by his affection for folklore and Casticismo madrileño.
