= Federación Estatal de Lesbianas, Gays, Transexuales y Bisexuales =

Spanish organization of LGBTQ associations

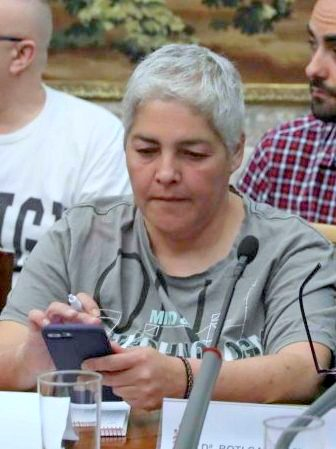
Uge Sangil, chairman of FELGTB, in 2018.

The Federación Estatal de Lesbianas, Gays, Trans, Bisexuales, Intersexuales y más (FELGTBI+; English: National Federation of Lesbians, Gays, Trans, Bisexuals, Intersex, and more) is the main LGBTQ organisation in Spain. FELGTBI+is characterised by demanding LGBT rights, at times through controversial campaigns. Its current chairman is Uge Sangil.

In June 2008, the United Nations Economic and Social Council granted consultative status to FELGTBI+and COC Netherlands.

== History ==
In 1992 the National Federation of Gays and Lesbians (FELG; Spanish: Federación Estatal de Gays y Lesbianas) was founded, at the proposal of the Collective of Gays and Lesbienas of Madrid (COGAM) and other LGBT organisations based in Madrid following their separation from the historic organisation Coordinadora de Frentes de Liberación Homosexual del Estado Español (COFLHEE).

In time, some groups from different parts of Spain joined the Federation, such as some from Granada and Barcelona, but very slowly. It was the late 1990s when some of the main organisations of the country (Gehitu of the Basque Country, Alega of Cantabria, Gamá of the Canary Islands and the Colectivo Lambda of Valencia, among others) joined FELG in an attempt build unity to pressure for the approval of a law recognising common law partnerships. Currently, more than 30 associations of all types compose the FELGT.

Beginning in 2003, the FELGT was led by Beatriz Gimeno. Previously, Pedro Zerolo and Armand de Fluviá had occupied that position. In March 2007, Beatriz Gimeno decided to begin collaborating with the university and Antoni Poveda came to hold the position of president of the FELGT. In the same meeting it was decided to add the "B" for bisexual to the acronym.

In 2007 the official name became FELGTB, including bisexual people in the name.

In 2021, it was decided in the IX Congreso de FELGTB to include Intersex and any other diverse and dissident people in the organisation's acronym, thus renaming the organisation to FELGTBI+, and electing Uge Sangil as its first non-binary president.

== Activism, campaigns, and polemics ==
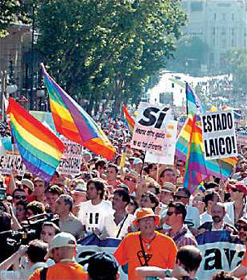
The FELGT, along with COGAM, convened the demonstration for same-sex marriage in Spain.

The FELGTBI+demands legal equality and social respect for diversity, is a promoter and convener (along with COGAM) of the national demonstration on the International Day of LGBT Pride (June 28), and fosters the training of its member associations' activists.

It has presented several controversial campaigns, such as VOTA ROSA ("VOTE PINK") and 2004 NO VOTES PP ("2004 DON'T VOTE PP"). Beatriz Gimeno justified this last slogan by pointing out the necessity of a political change to "advance our demands". Esperanza Aguirre, in response to this campaign, stated that sexual orientation doesn't necessarily determine political orientation, and noted that she was convinced that "the majority of gays are going to vote for Esperanza, and are going to vote PP". Ana Botella, number two on the list of the PP in Madrid, limited herself to saying that the demands of the FELGT don't come within the rivalries of the town council.

During the negotiation of the same-sex marriage law in Spain, the FELGT criticized the performance of the PP at various times, especially for presenting as an expert the psychiatrist Aquilino Polaino, who claimed that homosexuality was a pathology. Parallelly, when the Pope visited Valencia, the FELGT participated in the Jornadas Internacionales de Diversidad Familiar (International Conference on Family Diversity) (subsidized by the Ministry of Work and Social Affairs) and signed up for the collective "Jo no t'espere" ("I don't wait for you"), which was criticized harshly by the Catholic media. Some of those organisations tried to take the FELGT to the attorney general for "the continuous offenses of gay activism".

On April 20, 2007, the FELGT described as "incoherent" Mariano Rajoy's declarations about gay weddings, since he was claiming that if his son marries a man he will attend his wedding, while his party has appealed the same-sex marriage law as unconstitutional.

On April 28, 2007, FELGT launched the campaign Ni un céntimo para quien te discrimina ("Not one cent for anyone who discriminates against you"), coinciding with the income tax filings, encouraging citizens to mark the "social purposes" box instead of the box designated for the Catholic Church.

== See also ==
- LGBT rights in Spain
- List of LGBT rights organisations
