= 2007 Madrilenian regional election =

Election in the Spanish region of Madrid

- 27 May 2007

All 120 seats in the Assembly of Madrid 61 seats needed for a majority
- Opinion polls
- Registered: 4,458,989 ▲0.1%
- Turnout: 3,001,200 (67.3%) ▲4.7 pp
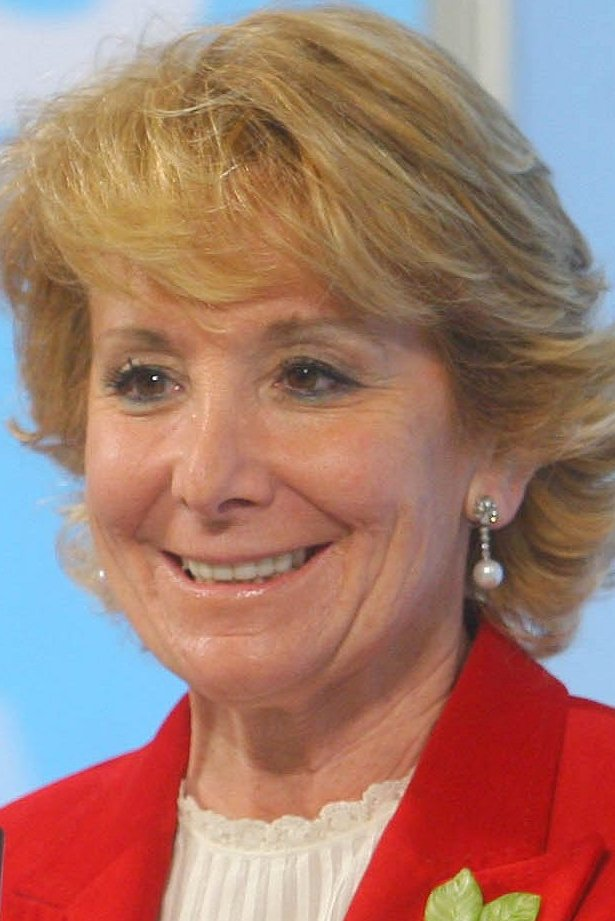

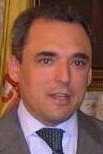

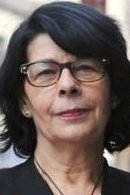
	First party	Second party	Third party
Leader	Esperanza Aguirre	Rafael Simancas	Inés Sabanés
Party	PP	PSOE	IUCM
Leader since	16 October 2002	26 November 2000	26 January 2007
Last election	57 seats, 48.5%	45 seats, 39.0%	9 seats, 8.5%
Seats won	67	42	11
Seat change	▲10	▼3	▲2
Popular vote	1,592,162	1,002,862	264,782
Percentage	53.3%	33.6%	8.9%
Swing	▲4.8 pp	▼5.4 pp	▲0.4 pp
President before election
Esperanza Aguirre
PP
President after election
Esperanza Aguirre
PP

A regional election was held in the Community of Madrid on 27 May 2007 to elect the 8th Assembly of the autonomous community. All 120 seats in the Assembly were up for election. It was held concurrently with regional elections in twelve other autonomous communities and local elections all across Spain. Because regional elections in Madrid were mandated for the fourth Sunday of May every four years, the October 2003 snap election did not alter the term of the four-year legislature starting in May 2003.

Esperanza Aguirre was re-elected for a second term in office, with the People's Party (PP) winning a record absolute majority comprising almost 56% of the seats in the Assembly. The Spanish Socialist Workers' Party (PSOE) obtained one of the worst party results since 1995, resulting in Rafael Simancas resigning as Secretary-General of the Socialist Party of Madrid shortly thereafter. United Left (IU) continued on its rising trend and won 2 additional seats.

== Overview ==
Under the 1983 Statute of Autonomy, the Assembly of Madrid was the unicameral legislature of the homonymous autonomous community, having legislative power in devolved matters, as well as the ability to grant or withdraw confidence from a regional president. The electoral and procedural rules were supplemented by national law provisions.

=== Date ===
The term of the Assembly of Madrid expired four years after the date of its previous ordinary election, with election day being fixed for the fourth Sunday of May every four years. The election decree was required to be issued no later than 54 days before the scheduled election date and published on the following day in the Official Gazette of the Community of Madrid (BOCM). The previous ordinary election was held on 25 May 2003, setting the date for election day on the fourth Sunday of May four years later, which was 27 May 2007.

The regional president had the prerogative to dissolve the Assembly of Madrid at any given time and call a snap election, provided that no motion of no confidence was in process, no nationwide election had been called and that dissolution did not occur either during the first legislative session or during the last year of parliament before its planned expiration, nor before one year after a previous one. In the event of an investiture process failing to elect a regional president within a two-month period from the first ballot, the Assembly was to be automatically dissolved and a fresh election called, which was to be held on the first Sunday 54 days after the call. Any snap election held as a result of these circumstances did not alter the date of the chamber's next ordinary election, with elected lawmakers serving the remainder of its original four-year term.

The election to the Assembly of Madrid was officially called on 3 April 2007 with the publication of the corresponding decree in the BOCM, setting election day for 27 May and scheduling for the chamber to reconvene on 12 June.

=== Electoral system ===
Voting for the Assembly was based on universal suffrage, comprising all Spanish nationals over 18 years of age, registered in the Community of Madrid and with full political rights, provided that they had not been deprived of the right to vote by a final sentence, nor were legally incapacitated.

The Assembly of Madrid had one seat per 50,000 inhabitants or fraction above 25,000. All were elected in a single multi-member constituency—corresponding to the autonomous community's territory—using the D'Hondt method and closed-list proportional voting, with a five percent-threshold of valid votes (including blank ballots) regionally. As a result of the aforementioned allocation, the Assembly was entitled to 120 seats, based on the official population figures resulting from the latest revision of the municipal register (as of 1 January 2006).

The law did not provide for by-elections to fill vacant seats; instead, any vacancies arising after the proclamation of candidates and during the legislative term were filled by the next candidates on the party lists or, when required, by designated substitutes.

=== Outgoing parliament ===
The table below shows the composition of the parliamentary groups in the chamber at the time of the election call.

Parliamentary composition in April 2007
Groups	Parties	Legislators	
Groups	Parties	Seats	Total
People's Parliamentary Group	PP	57	57
Socialist Parliamentary Group	PSOE	45	45
United Left Parliamentary Group	IUCM	9	9

== Parties and candidates ==
The electoral law allowed for parties and federations registered in the interior ministry, alliances and groupings of electors to present lists of candidates. Parties and federations intending to form an alliance were required to inform the relevant electoral commission within 10 days of the election call, whereas groupings of electors needed to secure the signature of at least 0.5 percent of the electorate in the Community of Madrid, disallowing electors from signing for more than one list. Amendments earlier in 2007 required a balanced composition of men and women in the electoral lists, so that candidates of either sex made up at least 40 percent of the total composition.

Below is a list of the main parties and alliances which contested the election:

Candidacy	Parties and alliances	Leading candidate	Ideology	Previous result		Gov.	Ref.
Candidacy	Parties and alliances	Leading candidate	Ideology	Vote %	Seats	Gov.	Ref.
PP	List: People's Party (PP)	Esperanza Aguirre	Conservatism; Christian democracy	48.5%	57	Yes	
PSOE	List: Spanish Socialist Workers' Party (PSOE)	Rafael Simancas	Social democracy	39.0%	45	No	
IUCM	List: United Left of the Community of Madrid (IUCM) – Communist Party of Madrid (PCM) – Revolutionary Workers' Party (POR)	Inés Sabanés	Socialism; Communism	8.5%	9	No	

== Campaign ==
=== Debates ===
2007 Madrilenian regional election debates
Date	Organizer(s)	Moderator(s)	P Present (Note: Denotes a main invitee attending the event.)				
Date	Organizer(s)	Moderator(s)	PP	PSOE	IUCM	Audience	Ref.
11 May	Telemadrid	Víctor Arribas	P Aguirre	P Simancas	P Sabanés	13.8% (255,000)	

== Opinion polls ==
The tables below list opinion polling results in reverse chronological order, showing the most recent first and using the dates when the survey fieldwork was done, as opposed to the date of publication. Where the fieldwork dates are unknown, the date of publication is given instead. The highest percentage figure in each polling survey is displayed with its background shaded in the leading party's colour. If a tie ensues, this is applied to the figures with the highest percentages. The "Lead" column on the right shows the percentage-point difference between the parties with the highest percentages in a poll.

=== Voting intention estimates ===
The table below lists weighted voting intention estimates. Refusals are generally excluded from the party vote percentages, while question wording and the treatment of "don't know" responses and those not intending to vote may vary between polling organisations. When available, seat projections determined by the polling organisations are displayed below (or in place of) the percentages in a smaller font; 61 seats were required for an absolute majority in the Assembly of Madrid (56 in the October 2003 election).

Color key:

Exit poll

Polling firm/Commissioner	Fieldwork date	Sample size	Turnout	PP	PSOE	IUCM	Lead
2007 regional election	27 May 2007	—N/a	67.3	53.3; 67	33.6; 42	8.9; 11	19.7
Ipsos/RTVE–FORTA	27 May 2007	?	?	50.5; 63/66	35.1; 43/46	9.0; 10/12	15.4
Opina/El País	14–17 May 2007	?	?	51.0; 63	38.5; 47/48	8.0; 9/10	12.5
Metroscopia/ABC	14–16 May 2007	1,211	65–70	52.5; 66	35.3; 44/45	7.8; 9/10	17.2
Celeste-Tel/Terra	9–15 May 2007	?	?	53.3; 67	35.2; 44	7.7; 9	18.1
Noxa/La Vanguardia	7–15 May 2007	800	?	52.3; 65	35.7; 44	9.3; 11	16.6
TNS Demoscopia/Antena 3	9 May 2007	?	?	? 64/65	? 46/47	? 9/10	?
Sigma Dos/El Mundo	27 Apr–8 May 2007	800	?	52.7; 65/67	35.8; 44/46	7.2; 9	16.9
Opina/Cadena SER (Note: "Pulsómetro 11/05/2007". Cadena SER (in Spanish). 11 May 2007. Archived from the original on 13 May 2007.)	6 May 2007	600	?	53.0; 64/65	38.2; 45/47	7.8; 9	14.8
CIS	9 Apr–6 May 2007	1,178	?	51.2; 64/65	35.6; 45	8.5; 10/11	15.6
Metroscopia/CEIM	12 Feb–1 Mar 2007	2,056	?	51.7; 65	36.6; 45	8.3; 10	15.1
Sigma Dos/PP	14–25 Feb 2007	2,000	?	52.8; 66/67	34.5; 43/44	8.4; 10	18.3
Iberconsulta/La Razón	15 Jan 2007	?	61.8	53.4; 67	35.5; 45	7.6; 9	17.9
Sigma Dos/El Mundo	16–21 Nov 2006	600	?	55.4; 65/66	33.8; 39/40	5.6; 6	21.6
Iberconsulta/La Razón (Note: "Suspiro de alivio en Génova con la última encuesta de Madrid". Semanal Digital (in Spanish). 17 September 2006.)	17 Sep 2006	?	?	50.6; 59	35.6; 41	? 11	15.0
Opina/El País	26 Apr 2006	1,000	?	50.0; 57	40.0; 46	7.0; 8	10.0
PP	12 Dec 2005	8,000	?	51.0; 59	? 43	7.5; 9	?
Synovate/PSOE	15 May 2005	2,625	?	45.1; 51	44.5; 50	9.0; 10	0.6
Sigma Dos/El Mundo	28 Feb 2005	?	?	? 56/57	? 47	? 8/9	?
2004 EP election	13 Jun 2004	—N/a	49.2	49.5 (57)	42.9 (49)	5.1 (5)	6.6
2004 general election	14 Mar 2004	—N/a	78.9	45.0 (53)	44.1 (51)	6.4 (7)	0.9
October 2003 regional election	26 Oct 2003	—N/a	62.5	48.5; 57	39.0; 45	8.5; 9	9.5

=== Voting preferences ===
The table below lists raw, unweighted voting preferences.

Polling firm/Commissioner	Fieldwork date	Sample size	PP	PSOE	IUCM	Question	X mark	Lead
2007 regional election (Note: Does not include non-resident citizens.)	27 May 2007	—N/a	36.5	22.9	6.1	—N/a	31.7	13.6
CIS	9 Apr–6 May 2007	1,178	32.3	24.4	5.0	27.3	6.7	7.9
IMOP/PSOE	12–20 Jul 2006	4,442	39.3	35.5	7.7	–	–	3.8
2004 EP election	13 Jun 2004	—N/a	24.9	21.5	2.6	—N/a	49.8	3.4
2004 general election	14 Mar 2004	—N/a	36.1	35.5	5.2	—N/a	19.3	0.6
October 2003 regional election	26 Oct 2003	—N/a	30.9	24.8	5.4	—N/a	36.0	6.1

=== Victory preferences ===
The table below lists opinion polling on the victory preferences for each party in the event of a regional election taking place.

Polling firm/Commissioner	Fieldwork date	Sample size	PP	PSOE	IUCM	Other/ None	Question	Lead
Opina/El País	14–17 May 2007	?	43.4	32.3	–	–	–	11.1
Noxa/La Vanguardia	7–15 May 2007	800	48.0	34.0	7.0	11.0		14.0
Opina/Cadena SER	6 May 2007	600	42.8	33.1	4.8	6.9	12.4	9.7
CIS	9 Apr–6 May 2007	1,178	38.1	31.2	6.1	8.2	16.4	6.9

=== Victory likelihood ===
The table below lists opinion polling on the perceived likelihood of victory for each party in the event of a regional election taking place.

Polling firm/Commissioner	Fieldwork date	Sample size	PP	PSOE	IUCM	Other/ None	Question	Lead
Noxa/La Vanguardia	7–15 May 2007	800	72.0	15.0	–	13.0		57.0
Opina/Cadena SER	6 May 2007	600	66.7	12.4	0.4	–	20.5	54.3
CIS	9 Apr–6 May 2007	1,178	62.8	13.4	0.1	0.8	23.0	49.4

=== Preferred President ===
The table below lists opinion polling on leader preferences to become president of the Community of Madrid.

Polling firm/Commissioner	Fieldwork date	Sample size					Other/ None/ Not care	Question	Lead
Polling firm/Commissioner	Fieldwork date	Sample size	Aguirre PP	Simancas PSOE	Marín IUCM	Sabanés IUCM	Other/ None/ Not care	Question	Lead
Noxa/La Vanguardia	7–15 May 2007	800	50.0	23.0	–	8.0	13.0	6.0	27.0
Opina/Cadena SER	6 May 2007	600	46.8	28.2	–	7.7	7.3	10.0	18.6
CIS	9 Apr–6 May 2007	1,178	40.2	25.2	–	7.8	3.8	26.8	15.0
Opina/El País	26 Apr 2006	1,000	41.3	30.6	6.4	–	8.7	13.0	10.7

=== Predicted President ===
The table below lists opinion polling on the perceived likelihood for each leader to become president.

Polling firm/Commissioner	Fieldwork date	Sample size					Other/ None/ Not care	Question	Lead
Polling firm/Commissioner	Fieldwork date	Sample size	Aguirre PP	Simancas PSOE	Marín IUCM	Sabanés IUCM	Other/ None/ Not care	Question	Lead
Opina/El País	14–17 May 2007	?	79.6	–	–	–	–	?	
Noxa/La Vanguardia	7–15 May 2007	800	78.0	13.0	–	–	–	9.0	65.0
Opina/Cadena SER	6 May 2007	600	74.3	12.8	–	0.9	0.5	11.5	61.5
Opina/El País	26 Apr 2006	1,000	55.6	20.9	1.9	–	0.7	20.9	34.7

== Results ==
=== Overall ===
← Summary of the 27 May 2007 Assembly of Madrid election results →
Parties and alliances	Popular vote			Seats	
Parties and alliances	Votes	%	±pp	Total	+/−
People's Party (PP)	1,592,162	53.29	+4.81	67	+10
Spanish Socialist Workers' Party (PSOE)	1,002,862	33.57	−5.43	42	−3
United Left of the Community of Madrid (IUCM)	264,782	8.86	+0.36	11	+2
The Greens (LV, LVM, LVCM, LV–GV)^{1}	33,044	1.11	+0.14	0	±0
Anti-Bullfighting Party Against Mistreatment of Animals (PACMA)	6,877	0.23	New	0	±0
Spanish Alternative (AES)	5,039	0.17	New	0	±0
For a Fairer World (PUM+J)	5,024	0.17	New	0	±0
Communist Party of the Peoples of Spain (PCPE)	4,231	0.14	+0.07	0	±0
National Democracy (DN)	3,518	0.12	−0.01	0	±0
Spanish Phalanx of the CNSO (FE–JONS)	3,123	0.10	+0.03	0	±0
The Phalanx (FE)	2,675	0.09	+0.01	0	±0
Citizen Unity (UC)	2,099	0.07	+0.04	0	±0
Madrid is Castile (MEC)	2,074	0.07	New	0	±0
Spanish Democratic Centre (CDEs)	1,816	0.06	New	0	±0
Humanist Party (PH)	1,757	0.06	+0.01	0	±0
Madrid First (PM)	1,667	0.06	+0.01	0	±0
Union for Leganés (ULEG)	1,422	0.05	New	0	±0
Liberal Centrist Union (UCL)	1,335	0.04	New	0	±0
Democratic Innovation (ID)	574	0.02	New	0	±0
Save Telemadrid Party (PSTM)	0	0.00	New	0	±0
Blank ballots	51,665	1.73	−0.01		
Total	2,987,746			120	+9
Valid votes	2,987,746	99.55	−0.06		
Invalid votes	13,454	0.45	+0.06		
Votes cast / turnout	3,001,200	67.31	+4.73		
Abstentions	1,457,789	32.69	−4.73		
Registered voters	4,458,989				
Sources
Footnotes: ^{1} The Greens results are compared to the combined totals of The Greens of the Community of Madrid and The Greens in the October 2003 election.

Popular vote
PP	53.29%
PSOE	33.57%
IUCM	8.86%
LV	1.11%
Others	1.45%
Blank ballots	1.73%

Seats
PP	55.83%
PSOE	35.00%
IUCM	9.17%

=== Elected legislators ===
The following table lists the elected legislators sorted by order of election:

Elected legislators
#	Name	List
1	Esperanza Aguirre Gil de Biedma	PP
2	Rafael Simancas Simancas	PSOE
3	Jaime Ignacio González González	PP
4	Francisco José Granados Lerena	PP
5	Matilde Fernández Sanz	PSOE
6	Beatriz María Elorriaga Pisarik ^{(es)}	PP
7	Andrés Rojo Cubero	PSOE
8	Lucía Figar de Lacalle	PP
9	Juan José Güemes Barrios	PP
10	Inés Sabanés Nadal	IUCM
11	Ruth Porta Cantoni	PSOE
12	Alfredo Prada Presa ^{(es)}	PP
13	Pedro Feliciano Sabando Suárez ^{(es)}	PSOE
14	María Gador Ongil Cores ^{(es)}	PP
15	Alberto López Viejo ^{(es)}	PP
16	Carmen Menéndez González-Palenzuela ^{(es)}	PSOE
17	Engracia Hidalgo Tena ^{(es)}	PP
18	Antonio Germán Beteta Barreda ^{(es)}	PP
19	Francisco Cabaco López ^{(ca)}	PSOE
20	María Paloma Adrados Gautier	PP
21	Gregorio Gordo Pradel	IUCM
22	María Helena Almazán Vicario	PSOE
23	María Cristina Cifuentes Cuencas	PP
24	Juan Soler-Espiauba Gallo ^{(es)}	PP
25	José Luis Pérez Ráez	PSOE
26	Regino García-Badell Arias	PP
27	Pilar Mercedes Lezcano Pastor	PSOE
28	María Carmen Álvarez-Arenas Cisneros	PP
29	David Pérez García	PP
30	José Manuel Franco Pardo	PSOE
31	Luis Peral Guerra	PP
32	María Caridad García Alvarez	IUCM
33	Rosa María Posada Chapado	PP
34	María Encarnación Moya Nieto	PSOE
35	José Ignacio Echeverría Echániz	PP
36	José Quintana Viar ^{(es)}	PSOE
37	María Elvira Rodríguez Herrer	PP
38	María Carmen Rodríguez Flores	PP
39	María Mercedes Díaz Masso	PSOE
40	Juan Van-Halen Acedo	PP
41	Modesto Nolla Estrada ^{(ca)}	PSOE
42	Ana Isabel Mariño Ortega ^{(es)}	PP
43	Miguel Ángel Reneses González-Solares ^{(es)}	IUCM
44	Benjamín Martín Vasco	PP
45	Adolfo Navarro Muñoz	PSOE
46	Luis del Olmo Flórez	PP
47	Josefa Dolores Pardo Ortiz	PSOE
48	Paloma Martín Martín	PP
49	Pedro Muñoz Abrines	PP
50	José Carmelo Cepeda García	PSOE
51	Elena de Utrilla Palombi	PP
52	Pedro Núñez Morgades ^{(es)}	PP
53	Fausto Fernández Díaz ^{(es)}	IUCM
54	María Angeles Martínez Herrando	PSOE
55	José María de Federico Corral	PP
56	Francisco Contreras Lorenzo	PSOE
57	Francisco Javier Rodríguez Rodríguez ^{(es)}	PP
58	Isabel Gema González González ^{(fr)}	PP
59	Francisco Javier Gómez Gómez	PSOE
60	Enrique Ruiz Escudero	PP
61	Pilar Sánchez Acera ^{(es)}	PSOE
62	María Luz Bajo Prieto	PP
63	Jesús Fermosel Díaz ^{(es)}	PP
64	Eulalia Vaquero Gómez	IUCM
65	César Augusto Giner Parreño	PSOE
66	Francisco de Borja Sarasola Jáudenes	PP
67	María Pilar Liébana Montijano	PP
68	María Antonia García Fernández	PSOE
69	Sonsoles Trinidad Aboín Aboín	PP
70	Jorge Gómez Moreno	PSOE
71	Pablo Casado Blanco	PP
72	María Nieves Margarita García Nieto	PP
73	José Antonio Díaz Martínez	PSOE
74	Alvaro Moraga Valiente	PP
75	Antero Ruiz López	IUCM
76	Fátima Peinado Villegas	PSOE
77	Jacobo Ramón Beltrán Pedreira ^{(ca)}	PP
78	María Nadia Alvarez Padilla	PP
79	Enrique Echegoyen Vera	PSOE
80	Jesús Adriano Valverde Bocanegra	PP
81	Eduardo Oficialdegui Alonso de Celada	PP
82	Carmen García Rojas	PSOE
83	Jaime González Taboada ^{(es)}	PP
84	Antonio Fernández Gordillo	PSOE
85	Carlos Clemente Aguado	PP
86	Juan Ramón Sanz Arranz	IUCM
87	Regina María Plañiol de Lacalle ^{(es)}	PP
88	Iván García Yustos	PSOE
89	Pilar Busó Borus	PP
90	Rosa María Alcalá Chacón	PSOE
91	Francisco de Borja Carabante Muntada	PP
92	Colomán Trabado Pérez	PP
93	Joaquín García Pontes	PSOE
94	José Gabriel Astudillo López	PP
95	Rosa Yolanda Villavicencio Mapy	PSOE
96	Marta Escudero Díaz-Tejeiro	PP
97	María de los Reyes Montiel Mesa ^{(es)}	IUCM
98	María Isabel Redondo Alcaide	PP
99	Alejandro Fernández Martín	PSOE
100	José Cabrera Orellana	PP
101	Raimundo Herraiz Romero	PP
102	Oscar Blanco Hortet	PSOE
103	María Teresa Gómez-Limón Amador	PP
104	Esperanza Rozas Piña	PSOE
105	Ana Camins Martínez	PP
106	Federico Jiménez de Parga Maseda	PP
107	María Josefa Amat Ruiz	IUCM
108	Juan Antonio Ruiz Castillo	PSOE
109	Pablo Morillo Casals	PP
110	Livia Castillo Pascual	PSOE
111	Alfonso Bosch Tejedor	PP
112	María Isabel Barreiro Fernández	PP
113	Adolfo Piñedo Simal ^{(es)}	PSOE
114	María del Carmen Martín Irañeta	PP
115	José Ignacio Fernández Rubio	PP
116	Francisco Hernández Ballesteros	PSOE
117	José María Arribas del Barrio	PP
118	Fernando Camaño Gómez	IUCM
119	María Dolores Rodríguez Gabucio	PSOE
120	Ignacio González Velayos	PP

== Aftermath ==
=== Government formation ===
Investiture; Nomination of Esperanza Aguirre (PP)
Ballot →	19 June 2007
Required majority →	61 out of 120
Yes: • PP (67)	67 / 120
No: • PSOE (42); • IUCM (11)	53 / 120
Abstentions	0 / 120
Absentees	0 / 120

== Bibliography ==
- Ley Orgánica 3/1983, de 25 de febrero, de Estatuto de Autonomía de la Comunidad de Madrid (Organic Law 3/1983). Official State Gazette (in Spanish). 25 February 1983 [version as of 2 July 2002]. BOE-A-1983-6317.
- Ley Orgánica 5/1985, de 19 de junio, del Régimen Electoral General (Organic Law 5/1985). Official State Gazette (in Spanish). 19 June 1985 [version as of 20 April 2007]. BOE-A-1985-11672.
- Ley 11/1986, de 16 de diciembre, Electoral de la Comunidad de Madrid (Law 11/1986). Official State Gazette (in Spanish). 16 December 1986 [version as of 29 December 2006]. BOE-A-1987-4255.
- Ley 5/1990, de 17 de mayo, reguladora de la facultad de disolución de la Asamblea de Madrid por el Presidente de la Comunidad (Law 5/1990). Official State Gazette (in Spanish). 17 May 1990 [version as of 29 May 1990]. BOE-A-1987-4255.
- Decreto 3/2007, de 2 de abril, de la Presidenta de la Comunidad de Madrid, por el que se convocan elecciones a la Asamblea de Madrid (Decree 3/2007). Official State Gazette (in Spanish). 2 April 2007. BOE-A-2007-7032.
