= 2011 Madrilenian regional election =

Election in the Spanish region of Madrid

- 22 May 2011

All 129 seats in the Assembly of Madrid 65 seats needed for a majority
- Opinion polls
- Registered: 4,622,750 ▲3.7%
- Turnout: 2,993,235 (65.9%) ▼1.4 pp
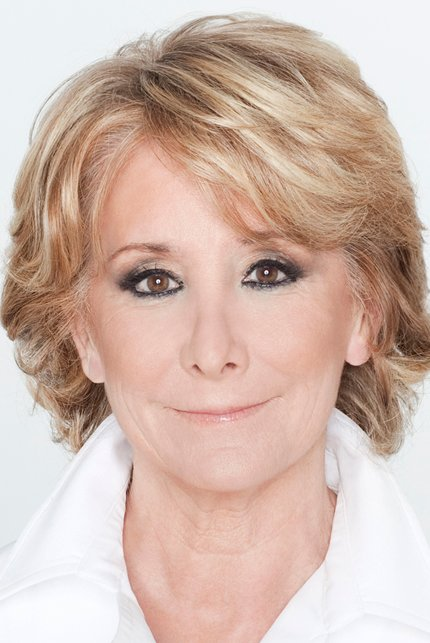

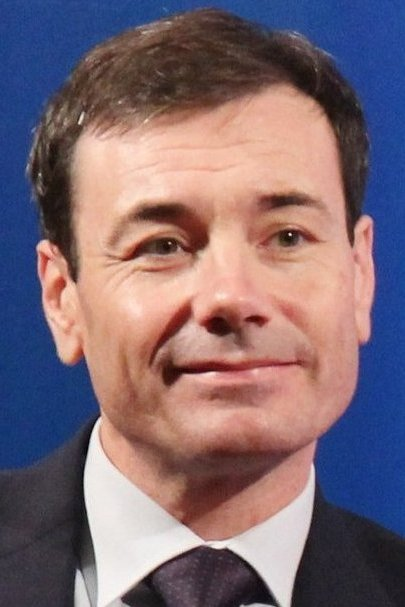

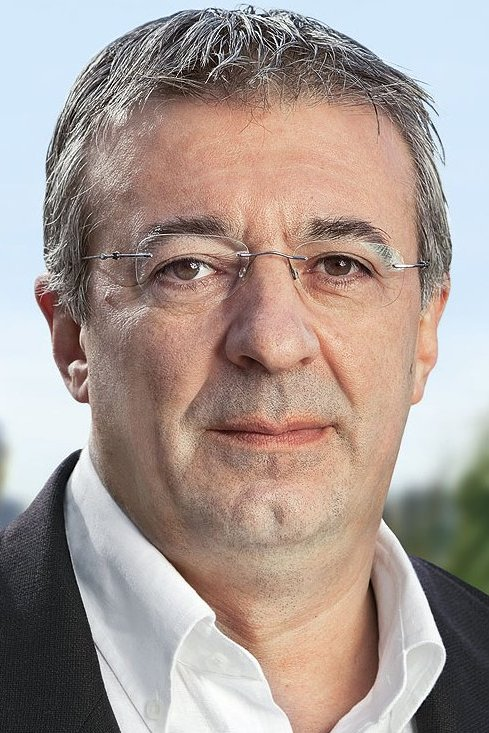

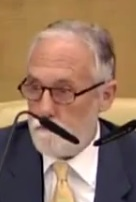
	First party	Second party	Third party
Leader	Esperanza Aguirre	Tomás Gómez	Gregorio Gordo
Party	PP	PSOE	IUCM–LV
Leader since	16 October 2002	27 July 2007	29 March 2009
Last election	67 seats, 53.3%	42 seats, 33.6%	11 seats, 8.9%
Seats won	72	36	13
Seat change	▲5	▼6	▲2
Popular vote	1,548,306	786,297	287,707
Percentage	51.7%	26.3%	9.6%
Swing	▼1.6 pp	▼7.3 pp	▲0.7 pp
	Fourth party
Leader	Luis de Velasco
Party	UPyD
Leader since	23 October 2010
Last election	Did not contest
Seats won	8
Seat change	▲8
Popular vote	189,055
Percentage	6.3%
Swing	New party
President before election
Esperanza Aguirre
PP
President after election
Esperanza Aguirre
PP

A regional election was held in the Community of Madrid on 22 May 2011 to elect the 9th Assembly of the autonomous community. All 129 seats in the Assembly were up for election. It was held concurrently with regional elections in twelve other autonomous communities and local elections all across Spain.

The election was won by the People's Party (PP), which had formed the regional government since the 1995 election. Overall, the PP under incumbent President Esperanza Aguirre won 72 seats, although the party's overall vote share decreased. In contrast, the Spanish Socialist Workers' Party (PSOE) under former Mayor of Parla Tomás Gómez had their worst result in terms of votes and seats up until that date. The third largest party, United Left (IU), polled their highest share of the vote since 1995, whereas Union, Progress and Democracy (UPyD), a party formed after the 2007 election, surpassed the 5% threshold and entered the Assembly for the first time.

== Overview ==
Under the 1983 Statute of Autonomy, the Assembly of Madrid was the unicameral legislature of the homonymous autonomous community, having legislative power in devolved matters, as well as the ability to grant or withdraw confidence from a regional president. The electoral and procedural rules were supplemented by national law provisions.

=== Date ===
The term of the Assembly of Madrid expired four years after the date of its previous ordinary election, with election day being fixed for the fourth Sunday of May every four years. The election decree was required to be issued no later than 54 days before the scheduled election date and published on the following day in the Official Gazette of the Community of Madrid (BOCM). The previous election was held on 27 May 2007, setting the date for election day on the fourth Sunday of May four years later, which was 22 May 2011.

The regional president had the prerogative to dissolve the Assembly of Madrid at any given time and call a snap election, provided that no motion of no confidence was in process, no nationwide election had been called and that dissolution did not occur either during the first legislative session or during the last year of parliament before its planned expiration, nor before one year after a previous one. In the event of an investiture process failing to elect a regional president within a two-month period from the first ballot, the Assembly was to be automatically dissolved and a fresh election called, which was to be held on the first Sunday 54 days after the call. Any snap election held as a result of these circumstances did not alter the date of the chamber's next ordinary election, with elected lawmakers serving the remainder of its original four-year term.

The election to the Assembly of Madrid was officially called on 29 March 2011 with the publication of the corresponding decree in the BOCM, setting election day for 22 May and scheduling for the chamber to reconvene on 7 June.

=== Electoral system ===
Voting for the Assembly was based on universal suffrage, comprising all Spanish nationals over 18 years of age, registered in the Community of Madrid and with full political rights, provided that they had not been deprived of the right to vote by a final sentence, nor were legally incapacitated. Amendments earlier in 2011 required non-resident citizens to apply for voting, a system known as "begged" voting (Spanish: Voto rogado).

The Assembly of Madrid had one seat per 50,000 inhabitants or fraction above 25,000. All were elected in a single multi-member constituency—corresponding to the autonomous community's territory—using the D'Hondt method and closed-list proportional voting, with a five percent-threshold of valid votes (including blank ballots) regionally. As a result of the aforementioned allocation, the Assembly was entitled to 129 seats, based on the official population figures resulting from the latest revision of the municipal register (as of 1 January 2010).

The law did not provide for by-elections to fill vacant seats; instead, any vacancies arising after the proclamation of candidates and during the legislative term were filled by the next candidates on the party lists or, when required, by designated substitutes.

=== Outgoing parliament ===
The table below shows the composition of the parliamentary groups in the chamber at the time of the election call.

Parliamentary composition in March 2011
Groups	Parties	Legislators	
Groups	Parties	Seats	Total
People's Parliamentary Group	PP	64	64
Socialist Parliamentary Group	PSOE	42	42
United Left Parliamentary Group	IUCM	11	11
Non-Inscrits	INDEP	3 (Note: Alfonso Bosch, Alberto López Viejo and Benjamín Martín Vasco, former PP legislators.)	3

== Parties and candidates ==
The electoral law allowed for parties and federations registered in the interior ministry, alliances and groupings of electors to present lists of candidates. Parties and federations intending to form an alliance were required to inform the relevant electoral commission within 10 days of the election call, whereas groupings of electors needed to secure the signature of at least 0.5 percent of the electorate in the Community of Madrid, disallowing electors from signing for more than one list. Additionally, a balanced composition of men and women was required in the electoral lists, so that candidates of either sex made up at least 40 percent of the total composition.

Below is a list of the main parties and alliances which contested the election:

Candidacy	Parties and alliances	Leading candidate	Ideology	Previous result		Gov.	Ref.
Candidacy	Parties and alliances	Leading candidate	Ideology	Vote %	Seats	Gov.	Ref.
PP	List: People's Party (PP)	Esperanza Aguirre	Conservatism; Christian democracy	53.3%	67	Yes	
PSOE	List: Spanish Socialist Workers' Party (PSOE)	Tomás Gómez	Social democracy	33.6%	42	No	
IUCM–LV	List: United Left of the Community of Madrid (IUCM) – Communist Party of Madrid (PCM) – Revolutionary Workers' Party (POR) – Republican Left (IR); The Greens (LV)	Gregorio Gordo	Socialism; Communism	8.9%	11	No	
UPyD	List: Union, Progress and Democracy (UPyD)	Luis de Velasco	Social liberalism Radical centrism	Did not contest		No	

== Campaign ==
=== Debates ===
2011 Madrilenian regional election debates
Date	Organizer(s)	Moderator(s)	P Present (Note: Denotes a main invitee attending the event.)				
Date	Organizer(s)	Moderator(s)	PP	PSOE	IUCM–LV	Audience	Ref.
8 May	Telemadrid	Víctor Arribas	P Aguirre	P Gómez	P Gordo	6.4% (175,000)	

== Opinion polls ==
The tables below list opinion polling results in reverse chronological order, showing the most recent first and using the dates when the survey fieldwork was done, as opposed to the date of publication. Where the fieldwork dates are unknown, the date of publication is given instead. The highest percentage figure in each polling survey is displayed with its background shaded in the leading party's colour. If a tie ensues, this is applied to the figures with the highest percentages. The "Lead" column on the right shows the percentage-point difference between the parties with the highest percentages in a poll.

=== Graphical summary ===
Local regression trend line of poll results from 27 May 2007 to 22 May 2011, with each line corresponding to a political party.

=== Voting intention estimates ===
The table below lists weighted voting intention estimates. Refusals are generally excluded from the party vote percentages, while question wording and the treatment of "don't know" responses and those not intending to vote may vary between polling organisations. When available, seat projections determined by the polling organisations are displayed below (or in place of) the percentages in a smaller font; 65 seats were required for an absolute majority in the Assembly of Madrid (61 in the 2007 election).

Color key:

Exit poll

Polling firm/Commissioner	Fieldwork date	Sample size	Turnout	PP	PSOE	IUCM–LV	UPyD	Lead
2011 regional election	22 May 2011	—N/a	65.9	51.7; 72	26.3; 36	9.6; 13	6.3; 8	25.4
Ipsos–Eco/FORTA	22 May 2011	?	?	52.6; 72/74	25.0; 33/36	9.8; 12/14	6.0; 8/9	27.6
NC Report/La Razón (Note: "El PP blinda sus feudos". La Razón (in Spanish). 16 May 2011. Archived from the original on 16 September 2011.)	3–10 May 2011	?	?	54.8; 73/76	28.8; 37/39	? 12/13	? 0/6	26.0
Metroscopia/El País	28–29 Apr 2011	600	?	53.4; 75	29.1; 41	9.7; 13	4.3; 0	24.3
GAD/COPE (Note: "El PP amplía su mayoría absoluta en Madrid". COPE (in Spanish). 28 April 2011. Archived from the original on 1 May 2011.)	28 Apr 2011	?	?	54.0; 75/76	28.3; 39/40	10.6; 13/14	3.1; 0	25.7
Obradoiro de Socioloxía/Público (Note: "El escándalo del 'caso Gürtel' no pasa factura electoral a Aguirre". Público (in Spanish). 2 May 2011. Archived from the original on 26 August 2011.)	25–28 Apr 2011	1,200	?	52.3; 73/74	33.3; 46/47	7.0; 9	3.4; 0	19.0
TNS Demoscopia/Antena 3 (Note: "Encuesta de TNS para Antena 3 y Onda Cero. Elecciones 22M. Expectativas electorales en la Comunidad de Madrid" (PDF). TNS Demoscopia (in Spanish). 2 May 2011. Archived from the original on 26 June 2012.)	25–26 Apr 2011	1,000	?	54.5; 75/77	29.3; 41/42	8.6; 11/12	3.2; 0	25.2
NC Report/La Razón	25 Apr 2011	?	?	55.1; 73/76	28.3; 37/39	9.4; 12/13	4.8; 0/6	26.8
Ikerfel/Vocento	15–20 Apr 2011	1,550	?	54.6; 77	30.4; 42	7.3; 10	3.7; 0	24.2
Celeste-Tel/Terra	13–20 Apr 2011	600	?	54.1; 72	28.3; 38	9.4; 12	5.8; 7	25.8
CIS	17 Mar–17 Apr 2011	1,528	?	52.1; 75	28.4; 41	9.1; 13	3.7; 0	23.7
Metroscopia/CEIM (Note: "El PSOE madrileño cosecharía el peor resultado de su historia". Intereconomía (in Spanish). 8 May 2011. Archived from the original on 10 May 2011.) (Note: "IU crece a costa del PSOE en la Comunidad de Madrid (La Gaceta)". Electómetro (in Spanish). 8 May 2011. Archived from the original on 11 May 2011.)	6–15 Apr 2011	4,100	?	53.9; 77	27.1; 38	9.9; 14	4.4; 0	26.8
Sigma Dos/El Mundo	11–14 Apr 2011	500	?	55.1; 76/77	28.8; 40/41	8.4; 11	2.9; 0	26.3
NC Report/La Razón (Note: "El PP lograría la mayoría absoluta más holgada de su historia en la Comunidad de Madrid (La Razón)". Electómetro (in Spanish). 28 February 2011. Archived from the original on 3 March 2011.)	23–25 Feb 2011	1,000	69.1	54.9; 73/76	28.5; 37/39	9.7; 12/13	4.4; 0/6	26.4
NC Report/La Razón (Note: "Aguirre supera el triunfo histórico de 2007". La Razón (in Spanish). 7 February 2011. Archived from the original on 14 March 2012.) (Note: "UPyD podría irrumpir con 6 escaños en la Asamblea de Madrid (La Razón)". Electómetro (in Spanish). 7 February 2011. Archived from the original on 8 February 2011.)	24–27 Jan 2011	1,000	68.6	54.5; 72/75	28.8; 38/40	9.7; 12/13	4.5; 0/6	25.7
DYM/ABC	20–30 Dec 2010	514	?	54.5; 72/74	29.8; 39/40	10.9; 14	3.0; 0/3	24.7
Sigma Dos/El Mundo	27–29 Dec 2010	500	?	54.6; 74/75	29.7; 40/41	9.8; 13	2.3; 0	24.9
Metroscopia/El País	8–18 Nov 2010	3,605	?	52.9; 73	32.8; 45	7.6; 10	3.6; 0	20.1
Sigma Dos/El Mundo	6–7 Oct 2010	800	?	55.4; 77	29.8; 41/42	7.2; 9/10	4.0; 0	25.6
Sigma Dos/El Mundo	24–26 May 2010	500	?	56.2; 75/79	25.5; 33/36	10.2; 13/14	4.6; 0/6	30.7
Metroscopia/El País	2 May 2010	?	?	50.6; 66	32.9; 43	9.0; 11	6.2; 8	17.7
Obradoiro de Socioloxía/Público (Note: "Aguirre pierde ventaja". Público (in Spanish). 19 April 2010. Archived from the original on 21 May 2011.)	22 Mar–13 Apr 2010	804	?	48.9; 65/68	34.0; 45/47	9.3; 12/13	4.5; 0/6	14.9
Sigma Dos/El Mundo	4–5 Nov 2009	500	?	51.2	32.3	8.2	5.0	18.9
2009 EP election	7 Jun 2009	—N/a	50.4	48.6 (64)	35.6 (47)	4.5 (0)	6.9 (9)	13.0
Metroscopia/El País	29 Apr 2009	400	?	50.6; 65	32.8; 42	10.6; 13	–	17.8
2008 general election	9 Mar 2008	—N/a	79.1	49.2 (66)	39.7 (54)	4.7 (0)	3.7 (0)	9.5
2007 regional election	27 May 2007	—N/a	67.3	53.3; 67	33.6; 42	8.9; 11	–	19.7

=== Voting preferences ===
The table below lists raw, unweighted voting preferences.

Polling firm/Commissioner	Fieldwork date	Sample size	PP	PSOE	IUCM–LV	UPyD	Question	X mark	Lead
2011 regional election (Note: Does not include non-resident citizens.)	22 May 2011	—N/a	34.8	17.6	6.5	4.2	—N/a	31.7	17.2
Obradoiro de Socioloxía/Público	25–28 Apr 2011	1,200	39.5	24.9	4.3	2.3	–	–	14.6
CIS	17 Mar–17 Apr 2011	1,528	31.9	17.2	4.8	2.9	29.5	8.4	14.7
Obradoiro de Socioloxía/Público	22 Mar–13 Apr 2010	804	34.4	24.3	6.6	2.7	–	–	10.1
2009 EP election	7 Jun 2009	—N/a	25.1	18.3	2.3	3.5	—N/a	48.3	6.8
2008 general election	9 Mar 2008	—N/a	39.7	31.8	3.8	3.0	—N/a	19.1	7.9
2007 regional election	27 May 2007	—N/a	36.5	22.9	6.1	–	—N/a	31.7	13.6

=== Victory preferences ===
The table below lists opinion polling on the victory preferences for each party in the event of a regional election taking place.

Polling firm/Commissioner	Fieldwork date	Sample size	PP	PSOE	IUCM–LV	UPyD	Other/ None	Question	Lead
CIS	17 Mar–17 Apr 2011	1,528	36.3	22.2	5.8	2.7	14.9	18.0	14.1

=== Victory likelihood ===
The table below lists opinion polling on the perceived likelihood of victory for each party in the event of a regional election taking place.

Polling firm/Commissioner	Fieldwork date	Sample size	PP	PSOE	IUCM–LV	UPyD	Other/ None	Question	Lead
GAD/COPE	28 Apr 2011	?	81.6	7.3	–	–	11.1		74.3
CIS	17 Mar–17 Apr 2011	1,528	79.1	3.7	0.2	0.1	0.4	16.5	75.4

=== Preferred President ===
The table below lists opinion polling on leader preferences to become president of the Community of Madrid.

All candidates

Polling firm/Commissioner	Fieldwork date	Sample size					Other/ None/ Not care	Question	Lead
Polling firm/Commissioner	Fieldwork date	Sample size	Aguirre PP	Gómez PSOE	Gordo IUCM	De Velasco UPyD	Other/ None/ Not care	Question	Lead
CIS	17 Mar–17 Apr 2011	1,528	40.7	19.5	2.8	0.8	13.0	23.2	21.2

Aguirre vs. Gómez

Polling firm/Commissioner	Fieldwork date	Sample size			Other/ None/ Not care	Question	Lead
Polling firm/Commissioner	Fieldwork date	Sample size	Aguirre PP	Gómez PSOE	Other/ None/ Not care	Question	Lead
GAD/COPE	28 Apr 2011	?	51.3	24.8	23.9		26.5
Obradoiro de Socioloxía/Público	25–28 Apr 2011	1,200	47.4	31.7	20.9		15.7
DYM/ABC	20–30 Dec 2010	514	42.0	32.0	–	26.0	10.0
Metroscopia/El País	12 Sep 2010	?	51.6	32.2	16.2		19.4
Obradoiro de Socioloxía/Público	22 Mar–13 Apr 2010	804	37.6	23.8	38.6		13.8

Aguirre vs. Jiménez

Polling firm/Commissioner	Fieldwork date	Sample size			Other/ None/ Not care	Question	Lead
Polling firm/Commissioner	Fieldwork date	Sample size	Aguirre PP	Jiménez PSOE	Other/ None/ Not care	Question	Lead
Metroscopia/El País	12 Sep 2010	?	48.3	38.7	13.0		9.6

=== Predicted President ===
The table below lists opinion polling on the perceived likelihood for each leader to become president.

Polling firm/Commissioner	Fieldwork date	Sample size			Other/ None/ Not care	Question	Lead
Polling firm/Commissioner	Fieldwork date	Sample size	Aguirre PP	Gómez PSOE	Other/ None/ Not care	Question	Lead
Obradoiro de Socioloxía/Público	25–28 Apr 2011	1,200	80.0	6.3	13.7		73.7
Obradoiro de Socioloxía/Público	22 Mar–13 Apr 2010	804	70.9	6.2	22.9		64.7

== Results ==
=== Overall ===
← Summary of the 22 May 2011 Assembly of Madrid election results →
Parties and alliances	Popular vote			Seats	
Parties and alliances	Votes	%	±pp	Total	+/−
People's Party (PP)	1,548,306	51.73	−1.56	72	+5
Spanish Socialist Workers' Party (PSOE)	786,297	26.27	−7.30	36	−6
United Left of the Community of Madrid–The Greens (IUCM–LV)	287,707	9.61	+0.75	13	+2
Union, Progress and Democracy (UPyD)	189,055	6.32	New	8	+8
Ecolo–Greens (Ecolo)^{1}	29,116	0.97	−0.14	0	±0
Citizens for Blank Votes (CenB)	19,220	0.64	New	0	±0
Anti-Bullfighting Party Against Mistreatment of Animals (PACMA)	15,897	0.53	+0.30	0	±0
For a Fairer World (PUM+J)	10,330	0.35	+0.18	0	±0
The Phalanx (FE)	6,424	0.21	+0.12	0	±0
Communist Party of the Peoples of Spain (PCPE)	5,656	0.19	+0.05	0	±0
Citizens–Party of the Citizenry (C's)	4,879	0.16	New	0	±0
Humanist Party (PH)	3,935	0.13	+0.07	0	±0
Spanish Alternative (AES)	3,690	0.12	−0.05	0	±0
Union for Leganés (ULEG)	3,435	0.11	+0.06	0	±0
Liberal Democratic Centre (CDL)	3,169	0.11	New	0	±0
Castilian Party (PCAS)	1,722	0.06	New	0	±0
Centre and Democracy Forum (CyD)	1,639	0.05	New	0	±0
Internationalist Solidarity and Self-Management (SAIn)	1,300	0.04	New	0	±0
Blank ballots	71,458	2.39	+0.66		
Total	2,993,235			129	+9
Valid votes	2,993,235	98.32	−1.23		
Invalid votes	51,114	1.68	+1.23		
Votes cast / turnout	3,044,349	65.86	−1.45		
Abstentions	1,578,401	34.14	+1.45		
Registered voters	4,622,750				
Sources
Footnotes: ^{1} Ecolo–Greens results are compared to The Greens totals in the 2007 election.

Popular vote
PP	51.73%
PSOE	26.27%
IUCM–LV	9.61%
UPyD	6.32%
Others	3.69%
Blank ballots	2.39%

Seats
PP	55.81%
PSOE	27.91%
IUCM–LV	10.08%
UPyD	6.20%

=== Elected legislators ===
The following table lists the elected legislators sorted by order of election:

Elected legislators
#	Name	List
1	Esperanza Aguirre Gil de Biedma	PP
2	Tomás Gómez Franco	PSOE
3	Jaime Ignacio González González	PP
4	Francisco José Granados Lerena	PP
5	María Amparo Valcarce García	PSOE
6	Beatriz María Elorriaga Pisarik	PP
7	Lucía Figar de Lacalle	PP
8	Gregorio Gordo Pradel	IUCM–LV
9	Juan Antonio Barranco Gallardo	PSOE
10	Antonio Germán Beteta Barreda	PP
11	Javier Fernández-Lasquetty Blanc	PP
12	Carmen Menéndez González-Palenzuela	PSOE
13	María Gador Ongil Cores	PP
14	Luis Velasco Rami	UPyD
15	Ana Isabel Mariño Ortega	PP
16	José Carmelo Cepeda García	PSOE
17	David Pérez García	PP
18	Eulalia Vaquero Gómez	IUCM–LV
19	Engracia Hidalgo Tena	PP
20	Matilde Fernández Sanz	PSOE
21	Juan Soler-Espiauba Gallo	PP
22	María Cristina Cifuentes Cuencas	PP
23	José Quintana Viar	PSOE
24	Pedro Muñoz Abrines	PP
25	Regino García-Badell Arias	PP
26	Rosa María Alcalá Chacón	PSOE
27	María Elvira Rodríguez Herrer	PP
28	Antero Ruiz López	IUCM–LV
29	Ramón Marcos Allo	UPyD
30	Esteban Parro del Prado	PP
31	Enrique Cascallana Gallastegui	PSOE
32	Luis Peral Guerra	PP
33	Rosa María Posada Chapado	PP
34	María Encarnación Moya Nieto	PSOE
35	José Ignacio Echeverría Echániz	PP
36	Alicia Delibes Liniers	PP
37	Carmen Villares Atienza	IUCM–LV
38	Eusebio González Jabonero	PSOE
39	Francisco de Borja Sarasola Jáudenes	PP
40	Juan Van Halen Acedo	PP
41	Josefa Dolores Pardo Ortiz	PSOE
42	Regina Plañiol Lacalle	PP
43	María Loreto Ruiz de Alda Moreno	UPyD
44	José María de Federico Corral	PP
45	José Manuel Franco Pardo	PSOE
46	Luis del Olmo Flórez	PP
47	Tania Sánchez Melero	IUCM–LV
48	Eva Piera Rojo	PP
49	María Helena Almazán Vicario	PSOE
50	Bartolomé González Jiménez	PP
51	María Eugenia Carballedo Berlanga	PP
52	Antonio Miguel Carmona Sancipriano	PSOE
53	Pedro Núñez Morgades	PP
54	Bonifacio de Santiago Prieto	PP
55	María Isabel Peces-Barba Martínez	PSOE
56	Francisco Javier Rodríguez Rodríguez	PP
57	María Josefa Amat Ruiz	IUCM–LV
58	Elvira María García Piñeiro	UPyD
59	María Pilar Liébana Montijano	PP
60	José Manuel Freire Campo	PSOE
61	Enrique Ruiz Escudero	PP
62	María Luz Bajo Prieto	PP
63	Carla Delgado Gómez	PSOE
64	Jesús Fermosel Díaz	PP
65	Íñigo Henríquez de Luna Losada	PP
66	José Luis García Sánchez	PSOE
67	Miguel Ángel Reneses González Solares	IUCM–LV
68	María Isabel Redondo Alcaide	PP
69	Sonsoles Trinidad Aboín Aboín	PP
70	María del Carmen Toledano Rico	PSOE
71	Jacobo Ramón Beltrán Pedreira	PP
72	Juan Luis Fabo Ordóñez	UPyD
73	María Nieves Margarita García Nieto	PP
74	Antonio Fernández Gordillo	PSOE
75	Álvaro Moraga Valiente	PP
76	Jesús Adriano Valverde Bocanegra	PP
77	Libertad Martínez Martínez	IUCM–LV
78	Laura Oliva García	PSOE
79	María Nadia Álvarez Padilla	PP
80	Francisco de Borja Carabante Muntada	PP
81	Óscar Iglesias Fernández	PSOE
82	Eduardo Oficialdegui Alonso de Celada	PP
83	Germán Alcayde Fort	PP
84	María Paz Martín Lozano	PSOE
85	Salvador Victoria Bolívar	PP
86	Mauricio Valiente Ots	IUCM–LV
87	Marta María Escudero Díaz-Tejeiro	PP
88	Enrique Normand de la Sotilla	UPyD
89	Mario Lisandro Salvatierra Saru	PSOE
90	Pilar Busó Borús	PP
91	Fernando Díaz Robles	PP
92	María Victoria Moreno Sanfrutos	PSOE
93	Colomán Trabado Pérez	PP
94	José Cabrera Orellana	PP
95	Jesús Miguel Dionisio Ballesteros	PSOE
96	María Espinosa de la Llave	IUCM–LV
97	María Inmaculada Sanz Otero	PP
98	María Carmen González Fernández	PP
99	Josefa Navarro Lanchas	PSOE
100	José Tomás Serrano Guio	PP
101	Raimundo Herraiz Romero	PP
102	Pedro Santín Fernández	PSOE
103	Alberto Reyero Zubiri	UPyD
104	Eva Tormo Mairena	PP
105	Ana Camins Martínez	PP
106	Sonia Conejero Palero	PSOE
107	Arsenio Rubén Bejarano Ferreras	IUCM–LV
108	Ángel Fernández Díaz	PP
109	José Miguel Moreno Torres	PP
110	Juan Segovia Noriega	PSOE
111	Carlos González Pereira	PP
112	María Belén Prado Sanjurjo	PP
113	María Teresa González Ausín	PSOE
114	María del Carmen Martín Irañeta	PP
115	María Isabel Moreno Martínez	IUCM–LV
116	Miguel Aguado Arnáez	PSOE
117	Álvaro González López	PP
118	Gabriel Julio López López	UPyD
119	José María Arribas del Barrio	PP
120	María Julia Martínez Torales	PSOE
121	Ignacio González Velayos	PP
122	Ana Abella Alava	PP
123	Eustaquio Jiménez Molero	PSOE
124	Francisco Javier Hernández Martínez	PP
125	Joaquín Sanz Arranz	IUCM–LV
126	Carmen Pérez-Llorca Zamora	PP
127	Modesto Nolla Estrada	PSOE
128	Antonio González Terol	PP
129	María Begoña García Martín	PP

== Aftermath ==
=== Government formation ===
Investiture; Nomination of Esperanza Aguirre (PP)
Ballot →	15 June 2011
Required majority →	65 out of 129
Yes: • PP (72)	72 / 129
No: • PSOE (36); • IUCM–LV (13); • UPyD (8)	57 / 129
Abstentions	0 / 129
Absentees	0 / 129

=== 2012 investiture ===
On 17 September 2012, Esperanza Aguirre announced her resignation as President of the Community of Madrid, being succeeded by Ignacio González.

Investiture; Nomination of Ignacio González (PP)
Ballot →	26 September 2012
Required majority →	65 out of 129
Yes: • PP (72)	72 / 129
No: • PSOE (34); • IUCM–LV (11); • UPyD (8)	53 / 129
Abstentions	0 / 129
Absentees: • PSOE (2); • IUCM–LV (2)	4 / 129

== Bibliography ==
- Ley Orgánica 3/1983, de 25 de febrero, de Estatuto de Autonomía de la Comunidad de Madrid (Organic Law 3/1983). Official State Gazette (in Spanish). 25 February 1983 [version as of 17 July 2010]. BOE-A-1983-6317.
- Ley Orgánica 5/1985, de 19 de junio, del Régimen Electoral General (Organic Law 5/1985). Official State Gazette (in Spanish). 19 June 1985 [version as of 30 April 2011]. BOE-A-1985-11672.
- Ley 11/1986, de 16 de diciembre, Electoral de la Comunidad de Madrid (Law 11/1986). Official State Gazette (in Spanish). 16 December 1986 [version as of 29 December 2006]. BOE-A-1987-4255.
- Ley 5/1990, de 17 de mayo, reguladora de la facultad de disolución de la Asamblea de Madrid por el Presidente de la Comunidad (Law 5/1990). Official State Gazette (in Spanish). 17 May 1990 [version as of 29 May 1990]. BOE-A-1987-4255.
- Decreto 3/2011, de 28 de marzo, de la Presidenta de la Comunidad de Madrid, por el que se convocan elecciones a la Asamblea de Madrid (PDF) (Decree 3/2011). Official Gazette of the Community of Madrid (in Spanish). 28 March 2011. BOCM-20110329-3.
