= October 2003 Madrilenian regional election =

Election in the Spanish region of Madrid

- 26 October 2003

All 111 seats in the Assembly of Madrid 56 seats needed for a majority
- Opinion polls
- Registered: 4,455,706 ▲0.3%
- Turnout: 2,788,495 (62.6%) ▼6.6 pp
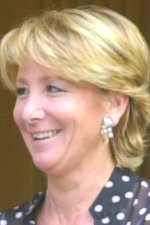

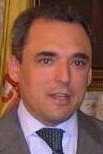

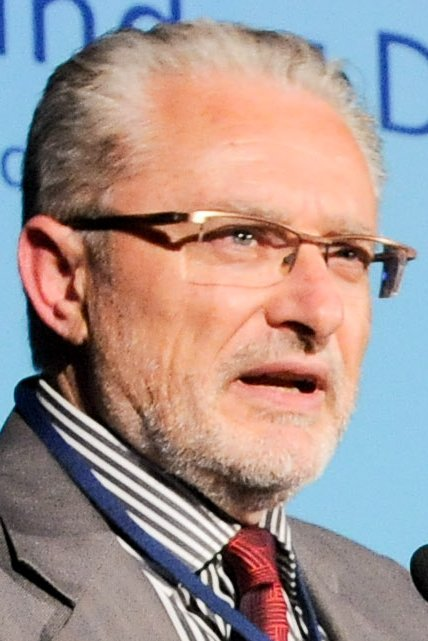
	First party	Second party	Third party
Leader	Esperanza Aguirre	Rafael Simancas	Fausto Fernández
Party	PP	PSOE	IUCM
Leader since	16 October 2002	26 November 2000	11 March 2002
Last election	55 seats, 46.7%	47 seats, 40.0%	9 seats, 7.7%
Seats won	57	45	9
Seat change	▲2	▼2	0
Popular vote	1,346,588	1,083,205	236,013
Percentage	48.5%	39.0%	8.5%
Swing	▲1.8 pp	▼1.0 pp	▲0.8 pp
President before election
Alberto Ruiz-Gallardón (acting)
PP
President after election
Esperanza Aguirre
PP

A regional election was held in the Community of Madrid on 26 October 2003 to elect the 7th Assembly of the autonomous community. All 111 seats in the Assembly were up for election. It was a snap election, held as a result of the parliamentary deadlock resulting from the Tamayazo scandal after the May 2003 election.

The People's Party (PP) recovered the absolute majority it had lost in the previous election. This came at the expense of the Spanish Socialist Workers' Party (PSOE), which suffered from the scandal of the rebel MPs who refused to support a PSOE–IU government led by Rafael Simancas. United Left (IU) saw a slight increase in support but failed to translate its gains into new seats. As a result of the election, Esperanza Aguirre was elected as President of the Community of Madrid, becoming the first woman to be appointed to the office.

== Overview ==
Under the 1983 Statute of Autonomy, the Assembly of Madrid was the unicameral legislature of the homonymous autonomous community, having legislative power in devolved matters, as well as the ability to grant or withdraw confidence from a regional president. The electoral and procedural rules were supplemented by national law provisions.

=== Date ===
The term of the Assembly of Madrid expired four years after the date of its previous ordinary election, with election day being fixed for the fourth Sunday of May every four years. The election decree was required to be issued no later than 54 days before the scheduled election date and published on the following day in the Official Gazette of the Community of Madrid (BOCM). The previous election was held on 25 May 2003, setting the date for election day on the fourth Sunday of May four years later, which was 27 May 2007.

The regional president had the prerogative to dissolve the Assembly of Madrid at any given time and call a snap election, provided that no motion of no confidence was in process, no nationwide election had been called and that dissolution did not occur either during the first legislative session or during the last year of parliament before its planned expiration, nor before one year after a previous one. In the event of an investiture process failing to elect a regional president within a two-month period from the first ballot, the Assembly was to be automatically dissolved and a fresh election called, which was to be held on the first Sunday 54 days after the call. Any snap election held as a result of these circumstances did not alter the date of the chamber's next ordinary election, with elected lawmakers serving the remainder of its original four-year term.

The Tamayazo scandal had resulted in the impossibility of any successful investiture in the Assembly elected at the May 2003 election, with a snap election being widely regarded by political parties as the only way out of the deadlock. However, a discussion sparked on the date in which it was legally feasible to hold such an election: the PP aimed for the parties to agree on the dissolution of parliament as soon as it was certified that no candidate was willing to attempt investiture, whereas the PSOE sought to adhere to the legal two-month period as it attempted to have the two defectors to resign their seats and be replaced by their successive candidates in the electoral list. With the deadline to nominate a candidate for investiture being set at 27 June, a vote was being required for no later than 3 July, thus setting the deadline for parliamentary dissolution on 3 September. After Simancas's failed investiture on 28–30 June and the growing expectation of a snap election in October, parties agreed on law amendments to ensure that early elections called under these circumstances were held on the nearest Sunday after all legal deadlines were met, which for this occasion was 26 October.

The election to the Assembly of Madrid was officially called on 30 August 2003 with the publication of the corresponding decree in the BOCM, setting election day for 26 October and scheduling for the chamber to reconvene on 12 November.

=== Electoral system ===
Voting for the Assembly was based on universal suffrage, comprising all Spanish nationals over 18 years of age, registered in the Community of Madrid and with full political rights, provided that they had not been deprived of the right to vote by a final sentence, nor were legally incapacitated.

The Assembly of Madrid had one seat per 50,000 inhabitants or fraction above 25,000. All were elected in a single multi-member constituency—corresponding to the autonomous community's territory—using the D'Hondt method and closed-list proportional voting, with a five percent-threshold of valid votes (including blank ballots) regionally. As a result of the aforementioned allocation, the Assembly was entitled to 111 seats, based on the official population figures resulting from the latest revision of the municipal register (as of 1 January 2002).

The law did not provide for by-elections to fill vacant seats; instead, any vacancies arising after the proclamation of candidates and during the legislative term were filled by the next candidates on the party lists or, when required, by designated substitutes.

=== Outgoing parliament ===
The table below shows the composition of the parliamentary groups in the chamber at the time of the election call.

Parliamentary composition in March 2011
Groups	Parties	Legislators	
Groups	Parties	Seats	Total
People's Parliamentary Group	PP	55	55
PSOE–Progressives Parliamentary Group	PSOE	45	45
United Left Parliamentary Group	IUCM	9	9
Mixed Parliamentary Group	INDEP	2 (Note: María Teresa Sáez and Eduardo Tamayo, former PSOE legislators.)	2

== Parties and candidates ==
The electoral law allowed for parties and federations registered in the interior ministry, alliances and groupings of electors to present lists of candidates. Parties and federations intending to form an alliance were required to inform the relevant electoral commission within 10 days of the election call, whereas groupings of electors needed to secure the signature of at least 0.5 percent of the electorate in the Community of Madrid, disallowing electors from signing for more than one list.

Below is a list of the main parties and alliances which contested the election:

Candidacy	Parties and alliances	Leading candidate	Ideology	Previous result		Gov.	Ref.
Candidacy	Parties and alliances	Leading candidate	Ideology	Vote %	Seats	Gov.	Ref.
PP	List: People's Party (PP)	Esperanza Aguirre	Conservatism; Christian democracy	46.7%	55	Yes	
PSOE	List: Spanish Socialist Workers' Party (PSOE)	Rafael Simancas	Social democracy	40.0%	47	No	
IUCM	List: United Left of the Community of Madrid (IUCM) – Communist Party of Madrid (PCM) – Revolutionary Workers' Party (POR) – Workers' Revolutionary Party–Revolutionary Left (PRT–IR)	Fausto Fernández	Socialism; Communism	7.7%	9	No	

== Opinion polls ==
The tables below list opinion polling results in reverse chronological order, showing the most recent first and using the dates when the survey fieldwork was done, as opposed to the date of publication. Where the fieldwork dates are unknown, the date of publication is given instead. The highest percentage figure in each polling survey is displayed with its background shaded in the leading party's colour. If a tie ensues, this is applied to the figures with the highest percentages. The "Lead" column on the right shows the percentage-point difference between the parties with the highest percentages in a poll.

=== Voting intention estimates ===
The table below lists weighted voting intention estimates. Refusals are generally excluded from the party vote percentages, while question wording and the treatment of "don't know" responses and those not intending to vote may vary between polling organisations. When available, seat projections determined by the polling organisations are displayed below (or in place of) the percentages in a smaller font; 56 seats were required for an absolute majority in the Assembly of Madrid.

Color key:

Exit poll

Polling firm/Commissioner	Fieldwork date	Sample size	Turnout	PP	PSOE	IUCM	Lead
October 2003 regional election	26 Oct 2003	—N/a	62.6	48.5; 57	39.0; 45	8.5; 9	9.5
Sigma Dos/Antena 3 (Note: Quick count.)	26 Oct 2003	?	?	47.7; 56	39.4; 46	8.2; 9	8.3
Sigma Dos/Antena 3	26 Oct 2003	?	?	48.2; 56/57	38.0; 44/45	9.0; 9/10	10.2
Gallup/RTVE	26 Oct 2003	?	?	49.0; 57/58	37.9; 43/44	8.7; 9/10	11.1
Celeste-Tel/La Razón	19 Oct 2003	?	?	? 56/57	? 44/45	? 10/11	?
Sigma Dos/El Mundo	19 Oct 2003	?	?	49.4; 56/58	? 43/45	? 10	?
Opina	16 Oct 2003	1,500	?	50.5; 58	39.0; 45	7.0; 8	11.5
Opina/El País	12–13 Oct 2003	?	?	49.5; 57/58	39.0; 45/46	7.1; 8	10.5
PP	9–10 Oct 2003	?	?	? 54	? 48	? 9	?
Opina/Cadena SER	4–6 Oct 2003	1,500	?	49.5; 57/58	38.0; 44/45	8.0; 9	11.5
CIS	27 Sep–5 Oct 2003	1,194	63.2	50.4; 57	37.4; 43	10.1; 11	13.0
Infortécnica	1–30 Sep 2003	2,006	59.7	51.4; 56/58	38.5; 43/44	10.1; 10/11	12.9
Sigma Dos/El Mundo	29 Sep 2003	?	?	48.2; 56/57	38.8; 45/46	8.5; 9/10	9.4
PP	28 Sep 2003	?	?	? 57	? 45	? 9	?
TNS Demoscopia/ABC	2–3 Sep 2003	806	?	48.4; 56	39.6; 45	9.4; 10	8.8
Sigma Dos/El Mundo	25 Jun 2003	800	?	48.4; 56/57	39.7; 45/46	7.9; 9	8.7
TNS Demoscopia/Tele 5 (Note: Undecided and/or abstentionists excluded.)	13–14 Jun 2003	600	?	46.4	40.6	7.2	5.8
May 2003 regional election	25 May 2003	—N/a	69.3	46.7; 55	40.0; 47	7.7; 9	6.7

=== Voting preferences ===
The table below lists raw, unweighted voting preferences.

Polling firm/Commissioner	Fieldwork date	Sample size	PP	PSOE	IUCM	Question	X mark	Lead
October 2003 regional election (Note: Does not include non-resident citizens.)	26 Oct 2003	—N/a	30.9	24.8	5.4	—N/a	36.0	6.1
CIS	27 Sep–5 Oct 2003	1,194	30.7	27.1	7.6	19.5	11.5	3.6
Infortécnica	1–30 Sep 2003	2,006	30.7	23.0	6.0	40.3		7.7
TNS Demoscopia/ABC	2–3 Sep 2003	806	29.7	27.7	6.8	–	–	2.0
TNS Demoscopia/Tele 5	13–14 Jun 2003	600	32.0	28.0	5.0	–	–	4.0
May 2003 regional election	25 May 2003	—N/a	31.9	27.4	5.2	—N/a	29.0	4.5

=== Victory preferences ===
The table below lists opinion polling on the victory preferences for each party in the event of a regional election taking place.

Polling firm/Commissioner	Fieldwork date	Sample size	PP	PSOE	IUCM	Other/ None	Question	Lead
Opina	16 Oct 2003	1,500	40.9	29.9	6.4	2.5	20.3	11.0
Opina/Cadena SER	4–6 Oct 2003	1,500	41.3	29.8	6.5	1.3	21.1	11.5
CIS	27 Sep–5 Oct 2003	1,194	34.7	33.8	8.0	3.8	19.8	0.9
TNS Demoscopia/ABC	2–3 Sep 2003	806	31.0	31.0	–	29.0	–	Tie

=== Victory likelihood ===
The table below lists opinion polling on the perceived likelihood of victory for each party in the event of a regional election taking place.

Polling firm/Commissioner	Fieldwork date	Sample size	PP	PSOE	IUCM	Other/ None	Question	Lead
Opina	16 Oct 2003	1,500	70.6	9.1	0.1	–	20.2	61.5
Opina/Cadena SER	4–6 Oct 2003	1,500	64.0	14.5	0.5	0.3	20.6	49.5
CIS	27 Sep–5 Oct 2003	1,194	66.2	9.9	0.0	0.4	23.5	56.3
Infortécnica	1–30 Sep 2003	2,006	56.6	11.5	0.5	0.2	31.2	45.1
TNS Demoscopia/ABC	2–3 Sep 2003	806	75.0	–	–	–	–	?
TNS Demoscopia/Tele 5	13–14 Jun 2003	600	66.0	–	–	–	–	?

=== Preferred President ===
The table below lists opinion polling on leader preferences to become president of the Community of Madrid.

Polling firm/Commissioner	Fieldwork date	Sample size				Other/ None/ Not care	Question	Lead
Polling firm/Commissioner	Fieldwork date	Sample size	Aguirre PP	Simancas PSOE	Fernández IUCM	Other/ None/ Not care	Question	Lead
Opina	16 Oct 2003	1,500	40.9	29.6	6.3	1.6	21.7	11.3
Opina/Cadena SER	4–6 Oct 2003	1,500	40.6	28.5	6.0	1.7	23.2	12.1
CIS	27 Sep–5 Oct 2003	1,194	33.1	30.3	5.1	8.6	22.9	2.8

=== Predicted President ===
The table below lists opinion polling on the perceived likelihood for each leader to become president.

Polling firm/Commissioner	Fieldwork date	Sample size				Other/ None/ Not care	Question	Lead
Polling firm/Commissioner	Fieldwork date	Sample size	Aguirre PP	Simancas PSOE	Fernández IUCM	Other/ None/ Not care	Question	Lead
Opina	16 Oct 2003	1,500	69.3	11.5	0.2	0.3	18.7	57.8
Opina/El País	12–13 Oct 2003	?	69.3	11.5	–	19.2		57.8
Opina/Cadena SER	4–6 Oct 2003	1,500	58.1	17.1	0.7	0.3	23.8	41.0

== Results ==
=== Overall ===
← Summary of the 26 October 2003 Assembly of Madrid election results →
Parties and alliances	Popular vote			Seats	
Parties and alliances	Votes	%	±pp	Total	+/−
People's Party (PP)	1,346,588	48.48	+1.81	57	+2
Spanish Socialist Workers' Party (PSOE)	1,083,205	39.00	−0.99	45	−2
United Left of the Community of Madrid (IUCM)	236,013	8.50	+0.82	9	±0
The Greens of the Community of Madrid (LVCM)	14,067	0.51	−0.41	0	±0
The Greens (LV)	12,665	0.46	−0.92	0	±0
Citizens for Blank Votes (CenB)	8,111	0.29	New	0	±0
New Socialism (NS)	6,176	0.22	New	0	±0
National Democracy (DN)	3,694	0.13	+0.02	0	±0
Family and Life Party (PFyV)	2,326	0.08	−0.05	0	±0
The Phalanx (FE)	2,212	0.08	−0.05	0	±0
Spanish Phalanx of the CNSO (FE–JONS)^{1}	2,036	0.07	−0.01	0	±0
Communist Party of the Peoples of Spain (PCPE)	1,894	0.07	−0.01	0	±0
Romantic Mutual Support Party (PMAR)	1,504	0.05	New	0	±0
Party Association of Widows and Legal Wives (PAVIEL)	1,461	0.05	−0.02	0	±0
Republican Left (IR)	1,396	0.05	−0.03	0	±0
Humanist Party (PH)	1,323	0.05	−0.02	0	±0
Madrilenian Independent Regional Party (PRIM)	1,255	0.05	−0.02	0	±0
Commoners' Land–Castilian Nationalist Party (TC–PNC)	1,135	0.04	−0.02	0	±0
Another Democracy is Possible (ODeP)	904	0.03	−0.03	0	±0
Citizen Unity (UC)	776	0.03	−0.03	0	±0
Federal Progressives (PF)	448	0.02	New	0	±0
Spanish Democratic Party (PADE)	0	0.00	−0.12	0	±0
Blank ballots	48,433	1.74	−0.25		
Total	2,777,622			111	±0
Valid votes	2,777,622	99.61	+0.06		
Invalid votes	10,873	0.39	−0.06		
Votes cast / turnout	2,788,495	62.58	−6.69		
Abstentions	1,667,211	37.42	+6.69		
Registered voters	4,455,706				
Sources
Footnotes: ^{1} Spanish Phalanx of the CNSO results are compared to Independent Spanish Phalanx–Phalanx 2000 totals in the May 2003 election.

Popular vote
PP	48.48%
PSOE	39.00%
IUCM	8.50%
Others	2.28%
Blank ballots	1.74%

Seats
PP	51.35%
PSOE	40.54%
IUCM	8.11%

=== Elected legislators ===
The following table lists the elected legislators sorted by order of election:

Elected legislators
#	Name	List
1	Esperanza Aguirre Gil de Biedma	PP
2	Rafael Simancas Simancas	PSOE
3	Miguel Ángel Villanueva González	PP
4	Matilde Fernández Sanz	PSOE
5	Juan José Güemes Barrios	PP
6	Luis María López Guerra	PSOE
7	Concepción Dancausa Treviño	PP
8	Inés Alberdi Alonso	PSOE
9	Beatriz Elorriaga Pisarik	PP
10	Fausto Fernández Díaz	IUCM
11	Alberto López Viejo	PP
12	Pedro Feliciano Sabando Suárez	PSOE
13	Antonio Germán Beteta Barreda	PP
14	Ruth Porta Cantoni	PSOE
15	Francisco José Granados Lerena	PP
16	Carlos Westendorp Cabeza	PSOE
17	Luis Eduardo Cortés Muñoz	PP
18	María Helena Almazán Vicario	PSOE
19	Rosa María Posada Chapado	PP
20	María Paloma Adrados Gautier	PP
21	Francisco Cabaco López	PSOE
22	Eduardo Cuenca Cañizares	IUCM
23	Luis Peral Guerra	PP
24	María Encarnación Moya Nieto	PSOE
25	María Carmen Álvarez-Arenas Cisneros	PP
26	José Antonio Díaz Martínez	PSOE
27	José Ignacio Echániz	PP
28	María Soledad Mestre García	PSOE
29	Luis Manuel Partida Brunete	PP
30	María Gador Ongil Cores	PP
31	José Quintana Viar	PSOE
32	José Ignacio Echeverría Echániz	PP
33	Miguel Ángel Reneses González Solares	IUCM
34	José Manuel Franco Pardo	PSOE
35	Juan Van-Halen Acedo	PP
36	Manuel Sánchez Cifuentes	PSOE
37	Fernando Martínez Vidal	PP
38	María Ángeles Martínez Herrando	PSOE
39	María Cristina Cifuentes Cuencas	PP
40	Juan Soler-Espiauba Gallo	PP
41	María Isabel Manzano Martínez	PSOE
42	Pedro Muñoz Abrines	PP
43	José Carmelo Cepeda García	PSOE
44	María Caridad García Álvarez	IUCM
45	Paloma Martín Martín	PP
46	Antonio Chazarra Montiel	PSOE
47	Sylvia Enseñat de Carlos	PP
48	Ana María Arroyo Veneroso	PSOE
49	Luis del Olmo Flórez	PP
50	Regino García-Badell Arias	PP
51	Modesto Nolla Estrada	PSOE
52	José María Federico Corral	PP
53	Francisco Hernández Ballesteros	PSOE
54	María Isabel Martínez-Cubells Yraola	PP
55	Margarita María Ferré Luparia	IUCM
56	Lucila María Corral Ruiz	PSOE
57	Álvaro Ramón Renedo Sedano	PP
58	Francisco Contreras Lorenzo	PSOE
59	Elena de Utrilla Palombi	PP
60	Francisco Javier Rodríguez Rodríguez	PP
61	Jorge Gómez Moreno	PSOE
62	Jesús Fermosel Díaz	PP
63	María Patrocinio Las Heras Pinilla	PSOE
64	David Pérez García	PP
65	Francisco Javier Gómez Gómez	PSOE
66	Benjamín Martín Vasco	PP
67	Jorge García Castaño	IUCM
68	Óscar José Monterrubio Rodríguez	PSOE
69	María Carmen Rodríguez Flores	PP
70	Álvaro Moraga Valiente	PP
71	Carmen García Rojas	PSOE
72	Isabel Gema González González	PP
73	Andrés Rojo Cubero	PSOE
74	Concepción Lostau Martínez	PP
75	Alicia Acebes Carabaño	PSOE
76	Francisco de Borja Sarasola Jáudenes	PP
77	Eduardo Sánchez Gatell	PSOE
78	Luis Suárez Machota	IUCM
79	Pilar Busó Borús	PP
80	Laura de Esteban Martín	PP
81	Rafael Gómez Montoya	PSOE
82	Eduardo Oficialdegui Alonso de Celada	PP
83	María Paz Martín Lozano	PSOE
84	Sonsoles Trinidad Aboín Aboín	PP
85	Marcos Sanz Agüero	PSOE
86	Colomán Trabado Pérez	PP
87	Antonio Fernández Gordillo	PSOE
88	Jesús Adriano Valverde Bocanegra	PP
89	José Guillermo Fernando Marín Calvo	IUCM
90	María Maravillas Martínez Doncel	PSOE
91	María Isabel Redondo Alcaide	PP
92	Pablo Morillo Casals	PP
93	Alejandro Fernández Martín	PSOE
94	María Pilar Liébana Montijano	PP
95	Juan Antonio Ruiz Castillo	PSOE
96	Carlos Clemente Aguado	PP
97	Adolfo Navarro Muñoz	PSOE
98	Oliva Cristina García Robredo	PP
99	Enrique Echegoyen Vera	PSOE
100	Jacobo Ramón Beltrán Pedreira	PP
101	María de los Reyes Montiel Mesa	IUCM
102	Federico Jiménez de Parga Maseda	PP
103	María Dolores Rodríguez Gabucio	PSOE
104	Francisco de Borja Carabante Muntada	PP
105	Adolfo Piñedo Simal	PSOE
106	José Cabrera Orellana	PP
107	María Antonia García Fernández	PSOE
108	Pablo Abejas Juárez	PP
109	Francisco Garrido Hernández	PSOE
110	Juan José García Ferrer	PP
111	María Teresa Cristina Calatayud Prieto	PP

== Aftermath ==
=== Government formation ===
Investiture; Nomination of Esperanza Aguirre (PP)
Ballot →	20 November 2003
Required majority →	56 out of 111
Yes: • PP (57)	57 / 111
No: • PSOE (45); • IUCM (9)	54 / 111
Abstentions	0 / 111
Absentees	0 / 111

== Bibliography ==
- Ley Orgánica 3/1983, de 25 de febrero, de Estatuto de Autonomía de la Comunidad de Madrid (Organic Law 3/1983). Official State Gazette (in Spanish). 25 February 1983 [version as of 2 July 2002]. BOE-A-1983-6317.
- Ley Orgánica 5/1985, de 19 de junio, del Régimen Electoral General (Organic Law 5/1985). Official State Gazette (in Spanish). 19 June 1985 [version as of 11 March 2003]. BOE-A-1985-11672.
- Ley 11/1986, de 16 de diciembre, Electoral de la Comunidad de Madrid (Law 11/1986). Official State Gazette (in Spanish). 16 December 1986 [version as of 27 August 2003]. BOE-A-1987-4255.
- Ley 5/1990, de 17 de mayo, reguladora de la facultad de disolución de la Asamblea de Madrid por el Presidente de la Comunidad (Law 5/1990). Official State Gazette (in Spanish). 17 May 1990 [version as of 29 May 1990]. BOE-A-1987-4255.
- Decreto 43/2003, de 29 de agosto, del Presidente de la Comunidad de Madrid, por el que se convocan elecciones a la Asamblea de Madrid (Decree 43/2003). Official State Gazette (in Spanish). 29 August 2003. BOE-A-2003-16866.
