= Gregorio Gordo =

Spanish politician (1958–2021)

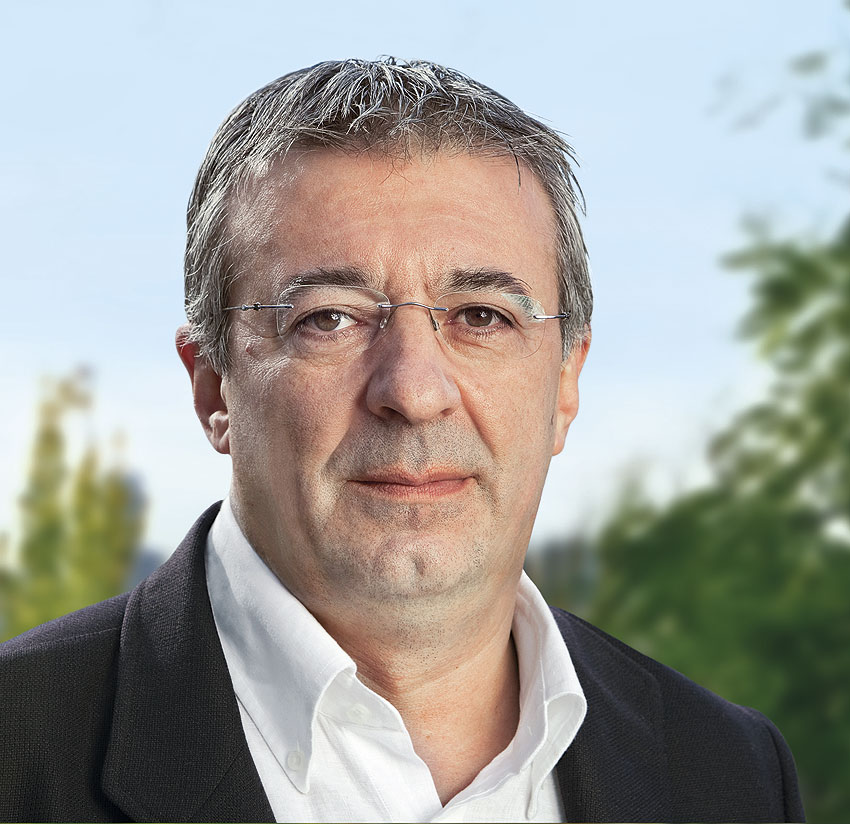

Member of the Assembly of Madrid
- In office 12 June 2007 – 31 March 2015

Getafe city councillor
- In office 1991–2003

Personal details
- Born: 19 August 1958; Madrid
- Died: 20 May 2021 (age 62); Getafe
- Citizenship: Spanish
- Political party: Communist Party of Spain (1983–2015); United Left (1986–2015)
- Occupation: Politician, trade unionist, goldsmith, civil servant

Gregorio "Goyo" Gordo Pradel (19 August 1958 – 20 May 2021) was a Spanish politician and trade unionist. A member of the Assembly of Madrid from 2007 to 2015, he led the United Left of the Community of Madrid from 2009 to 2012.

== Biography ==
Born on 19 August 1958 in Madrid, he joined the Comisiones Obreras (CC.OO.) in 1976.

Gordo, who dropped out from his university studies in law, worked in a goldsmith workshop from 1976 to 1983. He later became a public officer of the Spanish Tax Agency.

He became a member of the Communist Party of Spain in 1983 and also was a founding member of United Left.

He was elected in the 1991 municipal election in Getafe and became a city councillor, serving as such until 2003.

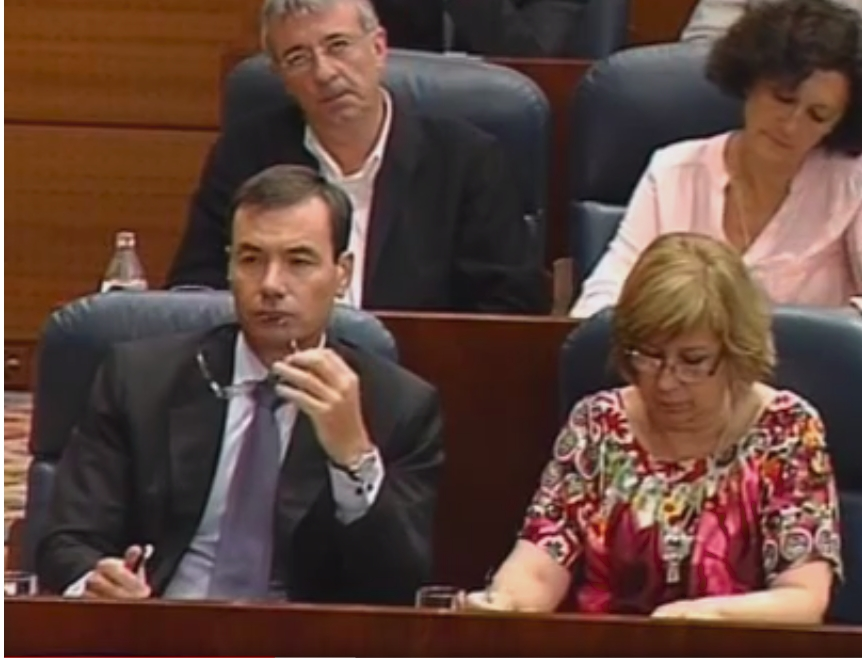
Behind Tomás Gómez and Maru Menéndez during a plenary session of the Assembly of Madrid in 2014

He ran second on the United Left list for the 2007 Madrilenian regional election led by Inés Sabanés, becoming member of the 8th Assembly of Madrid.

He became the new coordinator-general of United Left in March 2015, after his election among the members of their political council (107 positive votes, 7 abstentions). The post had been vacant for a while following the resignation of Fernando Marín in 2008.

He ran first in the United Left–The Greens list for the 2011 Madrilenian regional election, renovating his seat in the regional legislature for its 9th term.

In February 2015, following the credit card misuse scandal of Bankia successor to the Madrid Savings Bank Caja Madrid and the direct implication of the bank's vice-chairman and several other forma board members elected on behalf of the United Left, the national leadership accused the regional leadership of lack of action regarding the activities of its members of the bank, asking for Gordo's resignation. This led to his precautionary suspension of membership in the Communist Party, and his final expulsion from United Left on the basis of a "serious misconduct", following his refusal to renounce to his posts in the organization after repeated requirements by the United Left Federal Council.

In January 2018, informal meetings between Gordo and José Manuel Franco, Secretary-General of the Spanish Socialist Workers' Party of the Community of Madrid (PSOE-M) were reported.

He died from cancer at a hospital in Getafe on 20 May 2021.

Party political offices
Preceded by José Guillermo Fernando Marín Calvo	Coordinator of United Left of the Community of Madrid; March 2009 – December 2012	Succeeded by Eddy Sánchez
