= Luis de Velasco =

The name Luis de Velasco can refer to:

- Don Luís de Velasco (fl. 1561–1571), a Native American also known as Paquiquino (named for the following at baptism)
- Luis de Velasco, 2nd Viceroy of New Spain (1511–1564)
- Luis de Velasco, 1st Marquess of Salinas (c. 1534–1617), son of the previous
- Luis de Velasco y Velasco, 2nd Count of Salazar (1559–1625), son of the previous
- Luis Vicente de Velasco (1711–1762), naval commander
- Luis de Velasco Rami (born 1939), Spanish economist
