= Madrilenian regional election, 2003 =

There were two regional elections held in the Community of Madrid in 2003:

- Madrilenian regional election, May 2003
- Madrilenian regional election, October 2003
