= Juan Lobato =

Spanish politician (born 1984)

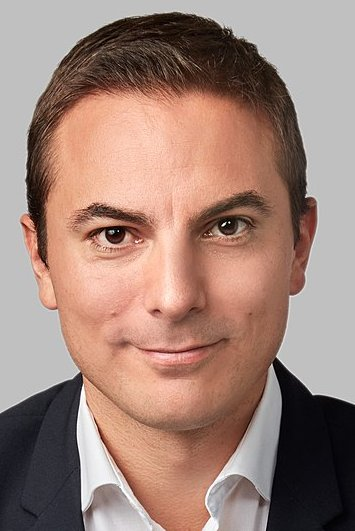

Secretary-General of the Socialist Workers' Party of the Community of Madrid
- In office 23 October 2021 – 27 November 2024
- Preceded by: José Manuel Franco
- Succeeded by: Óscar López Águeda

Mayor of Soto del Real
- In office 15 June 2015 – 16 April 2021
- Preceded by: Encarnación Izquierdo
- Succeeded by: Noelia Barrado

Member of the Senate
- Incumbent
- Assumed office 17 August 2023
- Appointed by: Assembly of Madrid

Member of the Assembly of Madrid
- Incumbent
- Assumed office 8 June 2021
- In office 10 June 2015 – 9 June 2019

Personal details
- Born: Juan Lobato Gandarias; 5 November 1984 (age 41) Madrid, Spain
- Party: PSOE
- Education: Autonomous University of Madrid

Juan Lobato Gandarias (born 5 November 1984) is a Spanish Socialist Workers' Party (PSOE) politician. First elected as a councillor in Soto del Real in 2003, he was the town's mayor from 2015 to 2021. He served in the Assembly of Madrid from 2015 to 2019 and again from 2021. He was his party's leader in the region from 2021 to 2024. In 2023, he was named to the Senate of Spain by the Assembly of Madrid.

== Biography ==
Born in Madrid, Lobato graduated in Business Management and Administration, and Law, from the Autonomous University of Madrid. He was the mayor of Soto del Real from 2015 to 2021, having first been elected to the city council in 2003 when he was 18, and a deputy in the Assembly of Madrid from 2015 to 2019. From 2010, he worked as a State Treasury Technician for the State Tax Administration Agency.

In 2017, he was a candidate for secretary general of the Spanish Socialist Workers' Party (PSOE) in the Community of Madrid. He came second, with 19.74% of the vote, behind José Manuel Franco.

Lobato was put in fourth place on the PSOE's list for the 2021 Madrilenian regional election, led by Ángel Gabilondo. He resigned as mayor of Soto del Real in April, before being re-elected to the Assembly in May. He and Irene Lozano were made the party's assistant spokespeople, behind Hana Jalloul.

In September 2021, Lobato put himself forward again as a candidate for secretary general. He was elected in October, with 61.23% of the votes, ahead of the mayor of Fuenlabrada, Francisco Javier Ayala. Also becoming spokesman of the party in the Assembly of Madrid, he offered to pact with regional president Isabel Díaz Ayuso (PP) so that the budget could be passed without compromises towards Vox.

In July 2023, Lobato was named by the Assembly of Madrid as one of its seven designated seats in the Senate of Spain. He said that it was necessary to build up his profile ahead of the next regional elections possibly in 2027, as a poll had showed that only 65% of the regional public recognised him.

Lobato resigned from the party leadership on 27 November 2024. His resignation was due to a controversy about the alleged leaking of Ayuso's partner's emails. Lobato maintained that neither he nor the PSOE leadership had seen the emails before they were mentioned in the media.

In 2024, Lobato took part in a politicians' special of El rival más débil, the Spanish version of Weakest Link. He came third behind fellow PSOE members Susana Díaz and Víctor Gutiérrez, joking that he was like prime minister Pedro Sánchez as he had been betrayed by Díaz.
