= Rafael Simancas =

Spanish politician (born 1966)

Rafael Simancas MP
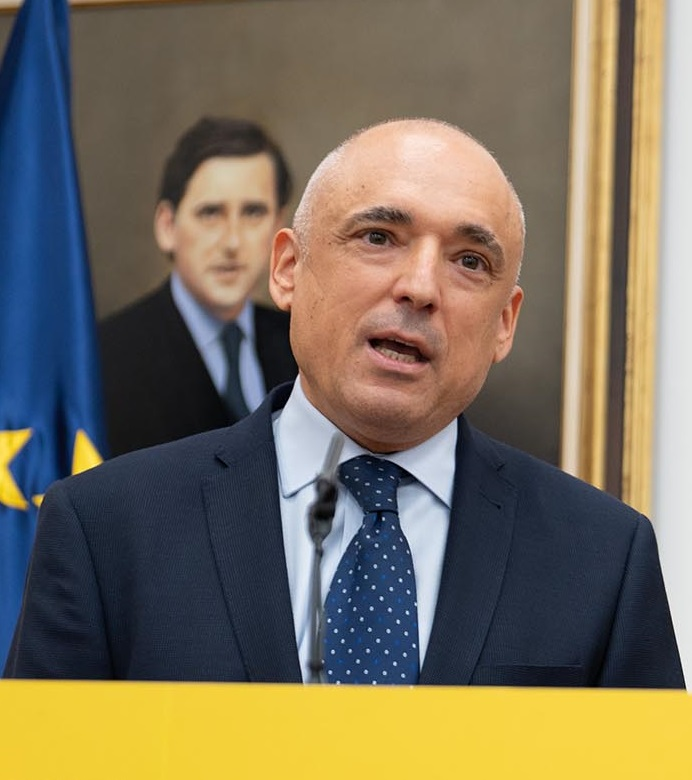

Secretary of State for Relations with the Cortes and Constitutional Affairs
- Incumbent
- Assumed office 21 July 2021
- Prime Minister: Pedro Sánchez
- Preceded by: José Antonio Montilla Martos

Secretary-General of the Spanish Socialist Workers' Party of Madrid
- In office 26 November 2000 – 4 June 2007
- Preceded by: Jaime Lissavetzky
- Succeeded by: Tomás Gómez

Personal details
- Born: Rafael Simancas Simancas; 1 July 1966 (age 60) Kehl, Germany
- Party: Spanish Socialist Workers' Party
- Education: Complutense University of Madrid

Rafael Simancas Simancas (born 1966) is a Spanish politician and member of the Spanish Socialist Workers' Party (PSOE). Since 2021, he is the Secretary of State for Relations with the Cortes and Constitutional Affairs. Formerly, he was the Secretary-General of the PSOE Madrid branch.

== Biography ==
Born on 1 September 1966 in Kehl, West Germany, his parents were immigrants from Córdoba. He graduated in Political Science at the Complutense University of Madrid. He became a member of the Madrid City Council after the 1995 municipal election and renovated his seat in the 1999 election. He served as Secretary-General of the Socialist Party of Madrid from 2000 to 2007, when he was replaced by Tomás Gómez He ran as head of list of the PSOE list in the May 2003, October 2003 and 2007 regional elections. Following his exit from the regional legislature in February 2008, he has been member of the 9th, 10th, 11th and 12th terms of the Congress of Deputies.

In July 2021, Presidency Minister Félix Bolaños appointed him as Secretary of State for Relations with the Cortes and Constitutional Affairs.
