= David Pérez (Spanish politician) =

Spanish politician

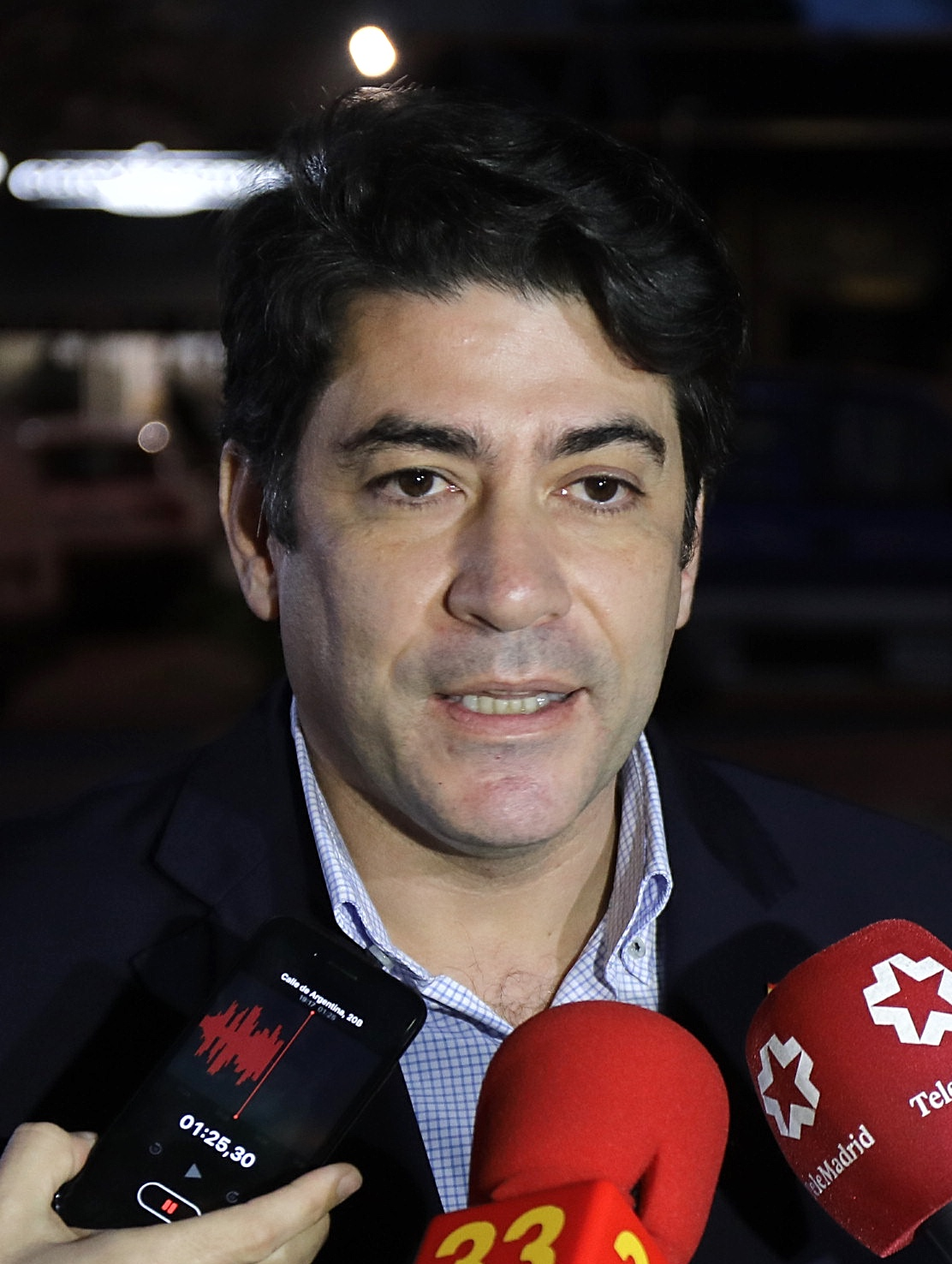
- In 2019

Mayor of Alcorcón
- In office 11 June 2011 – 15 June 2019

Member of the Assembly of Madrid
- Incumbent
- Assumed office 25 May 2003

Personal details
- Born: 8 August 1972 (age 53) Madrid
- Citizenship: Spanish
- Party: PP
- Occupation: Politician

David Pérez García (born 8 August 1972) is a Spanish Conservative politician of the People's Party (PP). A member of the Assembly of Madrid since 2003, he serves as Mayor of Alcorcón from 2011 to 2019.

== Biography ==
=== Early life ===
Born on 8 August 1972 in Madrid, he grew up in the neighborhood of Campamento. He graduated in Information Sciences (Journalism) at the Complutense University of Madrid.

A member of the People's Party (PP), Pérez became a member of the Assembly of Madrid after the May 2003 regional election, in the brief 6th term of the regional legislature, popularly named after the Tamayazo scandal. He renovated his seat at the October 2003, 2007, 2011 and 2015 elections. Pérez soon won the confidence of Esperanza Aguirre, becoming a close confidant and collaborator of the then president of the regional government and chairwoman of the regional branch of the PP, the People's Party of the Community of Madrid. He served as spokesperson of the PP parliamentary group in the legislature between 2008 and 2011.

=== Mayor of Alcorcón ===
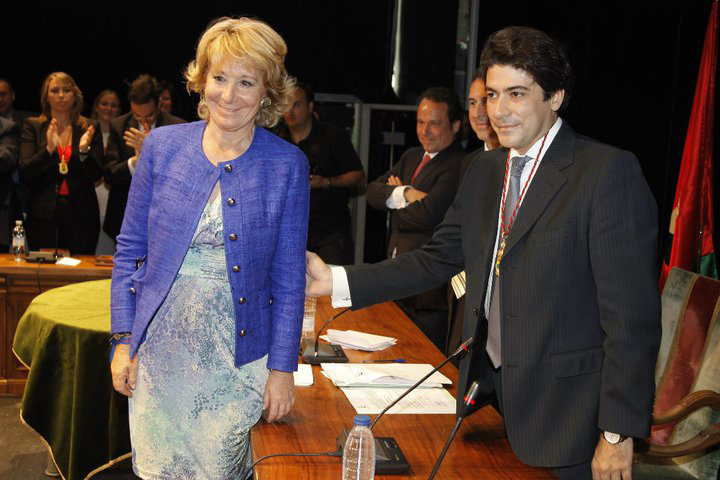
Next to Esperanza Aguirre during his inauguration as Mayor in 2011–

Pérez became the replacement of Fernando Díaz Robles as PP leader in Alcorcón, a suburb of the Spanish capital. He ran 1st in the PP list for the 2011 municipal election in the municipality. The PP obtained a qualified majority, and on 11 June, Pérez became Mayor with a qualified majority of the votes of the plenary.

He became the chairman of the Madrilenian Federation of Municipalities in December 2011.

The PP, while remaining the most voted list, lost its qualified majority in Alcorcón after the 2015 municipal election. In the voting for the investiture of the Mayor Pérez. Retrieved 10 votes vis-à-vis the 13 votes received by the PSOE candidate, Natalia de Andrés and 4 blank votes. As all candidates were short of the 14 votes of the qualified majority, David Pérez renovated the post of Mayor for another term in his condition of head of the electoral list with the most votes.

He ran 20th in the PP list to the Lower house in the 2015 Spanish general election but he was not elected.

== Stances ==
He is considered to be a visible representative of the most conservative wing of the People's Party of the Community of Madrid. Back in 2016 Pérez considered feminists "sometimes to be frustrated women, bitter women, rabid women and women failed as individuals who come to give everyone else lectures about how you should live and how you should think". After this tirade, considered to be "machista" by the opposition, Pérez said sorry and denied to be a machista.

Also in 2016, Pérez broke party discipline after deliberately missing the voting at the plenary of the Assembly of Madrid on the passing of the so-called Law against the LGTB-phobia promoted by the government of Cristina Cifuentes that pursued to fight back against aggressions at members of the mentioned group.

In 2017 he prepared an amendment to be presented at the PP regional congress urging his party to take "policies, actions and legal reforms" to gradually suppress right of abortion.

He endorsed bringing the so-called Eurovegas project to Alcorcón luring Sheldon Adelson with a plot to build the gambling resort. He envisioned Eurovegas as the means to end unemployment.

== Works ==
- — (2003). Técnicas de comunicación política. El lenguaje de los partidos. Madrid: Editorial Tecnos.

Party political offices
Preceded by Antonio Beteta	Spokesperson of the PP Group in the Assembly of Madrid; 2008–2011	Succeeded by Íñigo Henríquez de Luna
Political offices
Preceded by Enrique Cascallana	Mayor of Alcorcón; 2011–present	Succeeded by
