= Sara Hernández =

Spanish politician (born 1976)

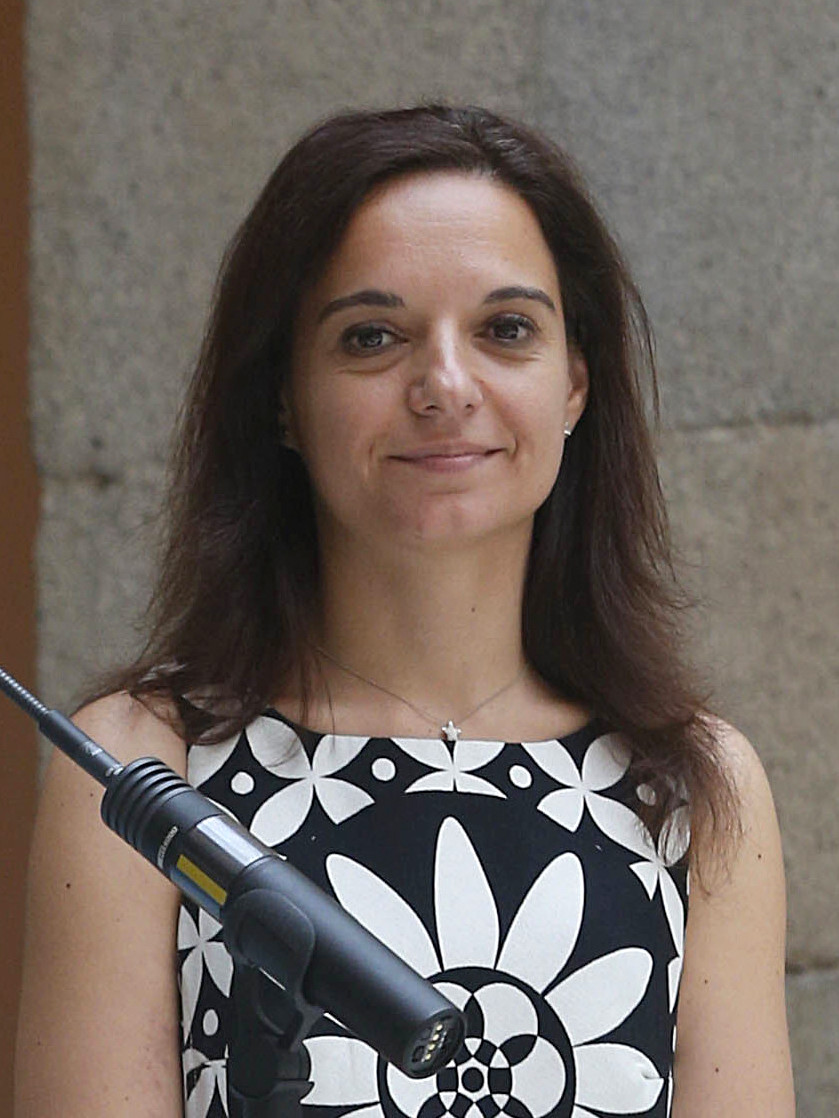

Sara Hernández Barroso (born 13 November 1976) is a Spanish politician of the Spanish Socialist Workers' Party (PSOE). She has been a city councillor in Getafe in the Community of Madrid since 2003 and the mayor since 2015. She was secretary-general of the Spanish Socialist Workers' Party of the Community of Madrid from 2015 to 2017.

== Early life and career ==
Hernández was born in Madrid to parents who emigrated from Castile and León, and she was raised in the suburban town of Getafe from the age of eight. She graduated with a law degree and a master's degree in institutional and political communications from the Charles III University of Madrid.

Hernández joined the Spanish Socialist Workers' Party (PSOE) in 2002. In the 2003 Spanish local elections, she was elected to the city council as number two on the party's list. Re-elected in 2007, she became first deputy mayor to Pedro Castro Vázquez. The party lost power in 2011, though she retained her seat and served as the party's spokesperson in the council, as well as being secretary general of the PSOE in Getafe.

== Mayor of Getafe ==
=== First term: 2015–2019 ===
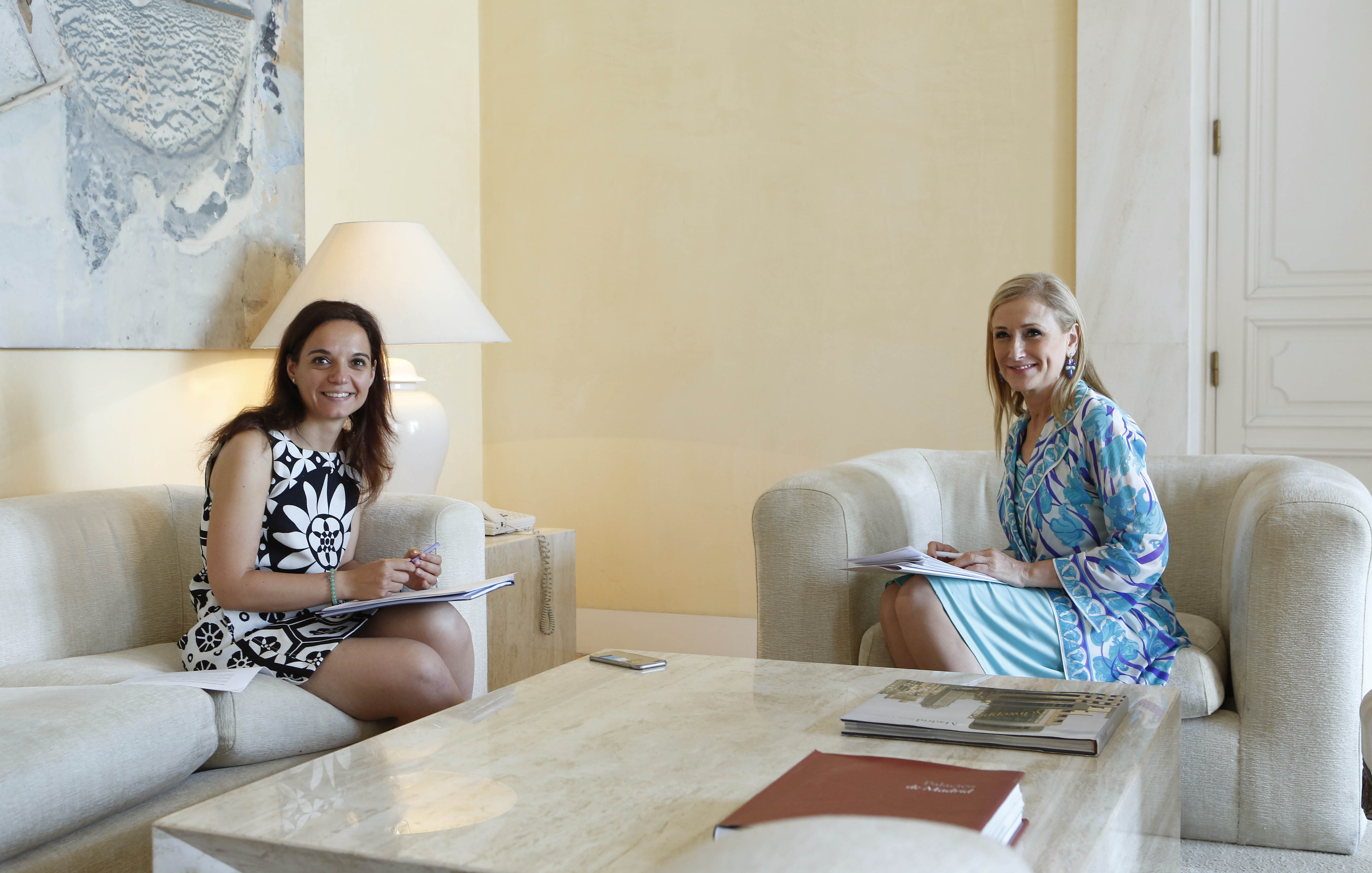
Hernández (left) meeting Cristina Cifuentes, President of the Community of Madrid, in August 2015

In October 2014, Hernández was chosen as the PSOE candidate for the 2015 Spanish local elections in Getafe. She was invested as mayor with the votes of the eight councillors from her party, seven from Ahora Getafe and the one from the United Left (IU); she became the first woman to hold the office.

Hernández was elected secretary-general of the Spanish Socialist Workers' Party of the Community of Madrid with 57.67% of the vote in July 2015, running against Assembly of Madrid deputy Juan Segovia Noriega. She decided against running for re-election of the party office two years later and joined the eventually successful campaign of José Manuel Franco. Before withdrawing her candidacy, she had voiced disagreement with Franco's assertion that the people of the Community of Madrid constitute a nation within Spain.

=== Second term: 2019–2023 ===
Hernández was re-elected for a second term in the 2019 Spanish local elections. Though she did not get support to form a majority government from any other party, she was invested as the leader of the most voted-for party.

In 2021, Hernández's administration distributed sex education leaflets to schools, including by her own words, primary schools. The leaftlets included phrases encouraging female masturbation, such as "turn off the TV and turn on your clitoris" and "masturbation rules!". She defended this in a plenary session by saying "It is a clear gesture of this administration that all boys and girls of Getafe, all teenagers, all young men and young women of the municipality have relations that are clearly and evidently satisfactory, and clearly and evidently equal". The leaflets were removed as a precautionary measure on a court order after a complaint from a Christian group, who took issue with the depiction of the Virgin Mary in them. In the final judgement, the judge ruled that the leaflets attacked the beliefs of Christian pupils and violated the rights of Christian parents to raise their children according to their beliefs. After this judgement, the People's Party (PP) group in the city council tabled a motion of no confidence in Hernández, which was rejected by the PSOE, Podemos and Más Madrid.

=== Third term: 2023–2027 ===
Hernández was re-elected for a third term in the 2023 Spanish local elections, forming a majority with the support of the ten councillors from her party, plus three from Más Madrid and two from Unidas Podemos.

In October 2023, Hernández's administration removed the name of Getafe-born footballer Alfonso Pérez from the city's Estadio Coliseum, which is owned by the municipality and leased to La Liga club Getafe CF. Hernández had taken issue with an interview in which Pérez said that he would force the players of the Spain women's national football team to kiss the nation's flag, in reference to their boycott over the Rubiales affair. The decision was criticised by the President of the Community of Madrid, Isabel Díaz Ayuso of the PP, who said that Pérez had the right to hold opinions contrary to Hernández's.
