= Tomás Gómez (Spanish politician) =

Spanish politician

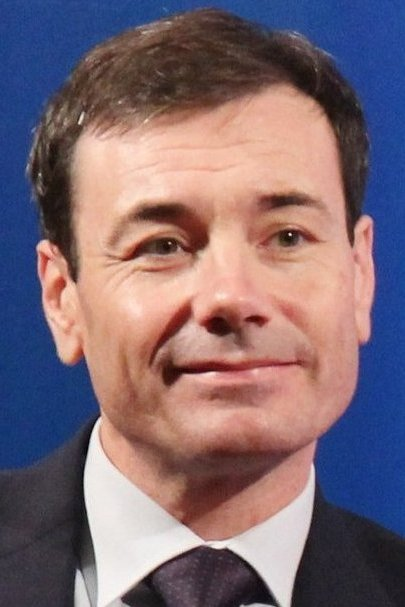

Secretary-General of the Spanish Socialist Workers' Party of Madrid
- In office 27 July 2007 – 11 February 2015
- Preceded by: Rafael Simancas
- Succeeded by: Sara Hernández

Mayor of Parla
- In office 4 July 1999 – 23 October 2008
- Preceded by: José Manuel Ibáñez
- Succeeded by: José María Fraile

Member of the Senate
- In office 8 June 2011 – 13 February 2015
- Constituency: Madrid

Member of the Assembly of Madrid
- In office 29 June 2011 – 27 February 2013

Personal details
- Born: Tomás Gómez Franco; 27 March 1968 (age 58) Enschede, Netherlands
- Party: Spanish Socialist Workers' Party
- Education: Complutense University of Madrid

Tomás Gómez Franco (born 27 March 1968) is a Spanish politician and member of the Spanish Socialist Workers' Party (PSOE), former Secretary-General of the PSOE Madrid branch. Until 2013, Gomez served as a member of the Senate of Spain. In October 2010 he was selected as the PSOE candidate for President of Madrid in the 2011 assembly elections. However, the PSOE received their worst ever result in those elections.

On 11 February 2015, he was dismissed from the PSOE regional leadership by the party's Secretary-General Pedro Sánchez after suspicions of Gómez had been involved in a corruption scandal during his time as Mayor of Parla. Gómez, alongside the party's regional leadership, refused to stand down and accused Sánchez of "authoritarianism", defending his personal honor and announcing possible legal actions against the party's National Executive headed by Sánchez for violating party statutes.

Political offices
Preceded by José Manuel Ibáñez	Mayor of Parla; 1999-2008	Succeeded by José María Fraile
Party political offices
Preceded by Rafael Simancas	Secretary-General of the Spanish Socialist Workers' Party of Madrid; 2007–2015	Succeeded by Sara Hernández
Preceded by Maru Menéndez	Leader of the Socialist Group in the Assembly of Madrid; 2011–2015	Succeeded by José Manuel Franco
