= Ruth Porta =

Spanish politician (1957–2023)

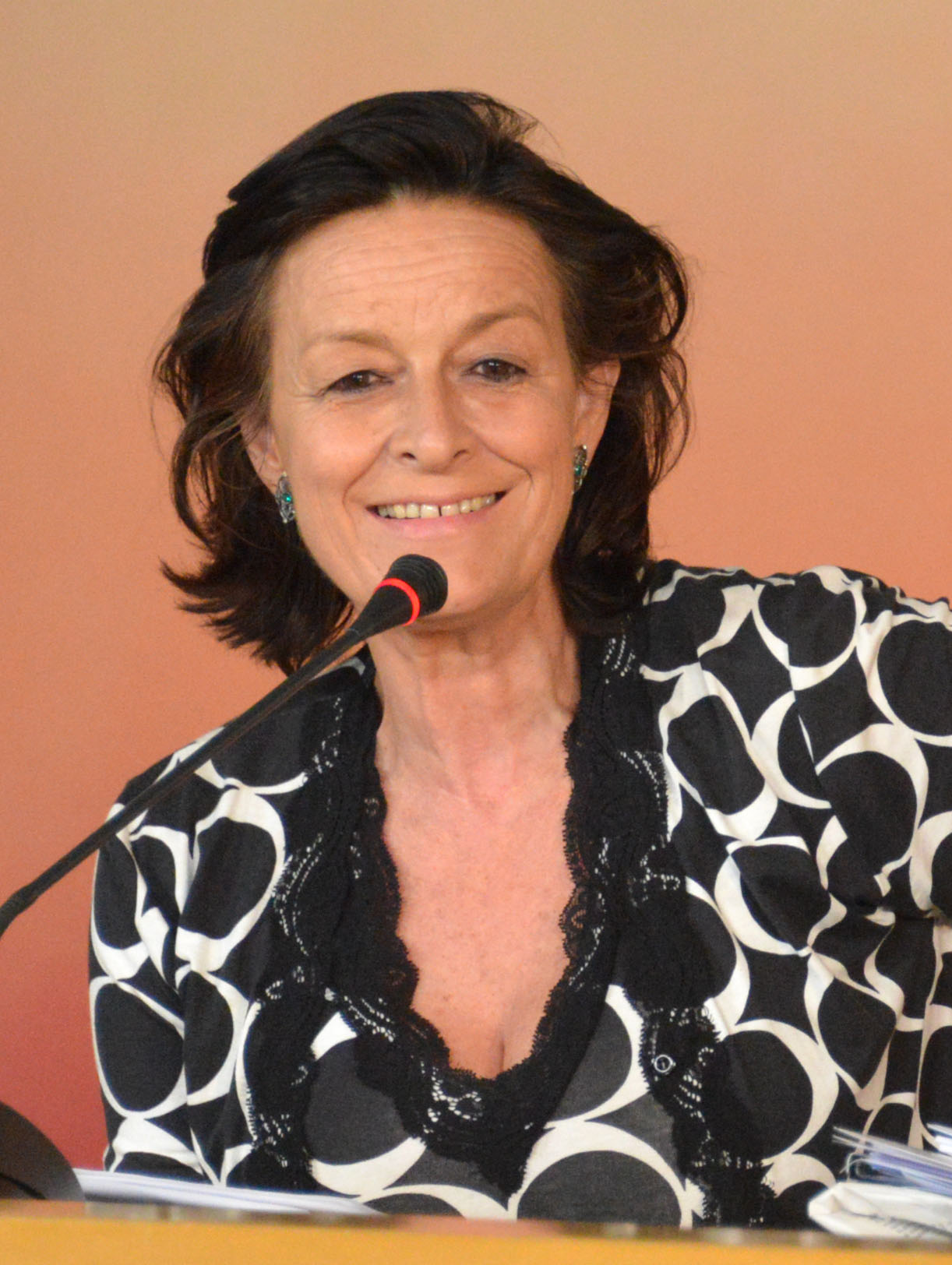
- Porta in 2013

Member of the Senate of Spain
- In office 28 June 2007 – 27 September 2011

Member of the Assembly of Madrid
- In office 10 June 2003 – 8 June 2011

Personal details
- Born: Ruth Porta Cantoni; 22 April 1957 Palma de Mallorca, Spain
- Died: 2 May 2023 (aged 66)
- Party: PSOE–M
- Education: Complutense University of Madrid

Ruth Porta Cantoni (22 April 1957 – 2 May 2023) was a Spanish politician. A member of the Spanish Socialist Workers' Party of the Community of Madrid, she served in the Senate from 2007 to 2011.

Porta died on 2 May 2023, at the age of 66.
