= José Manuel Franco =

Spanish politician (born 1957)

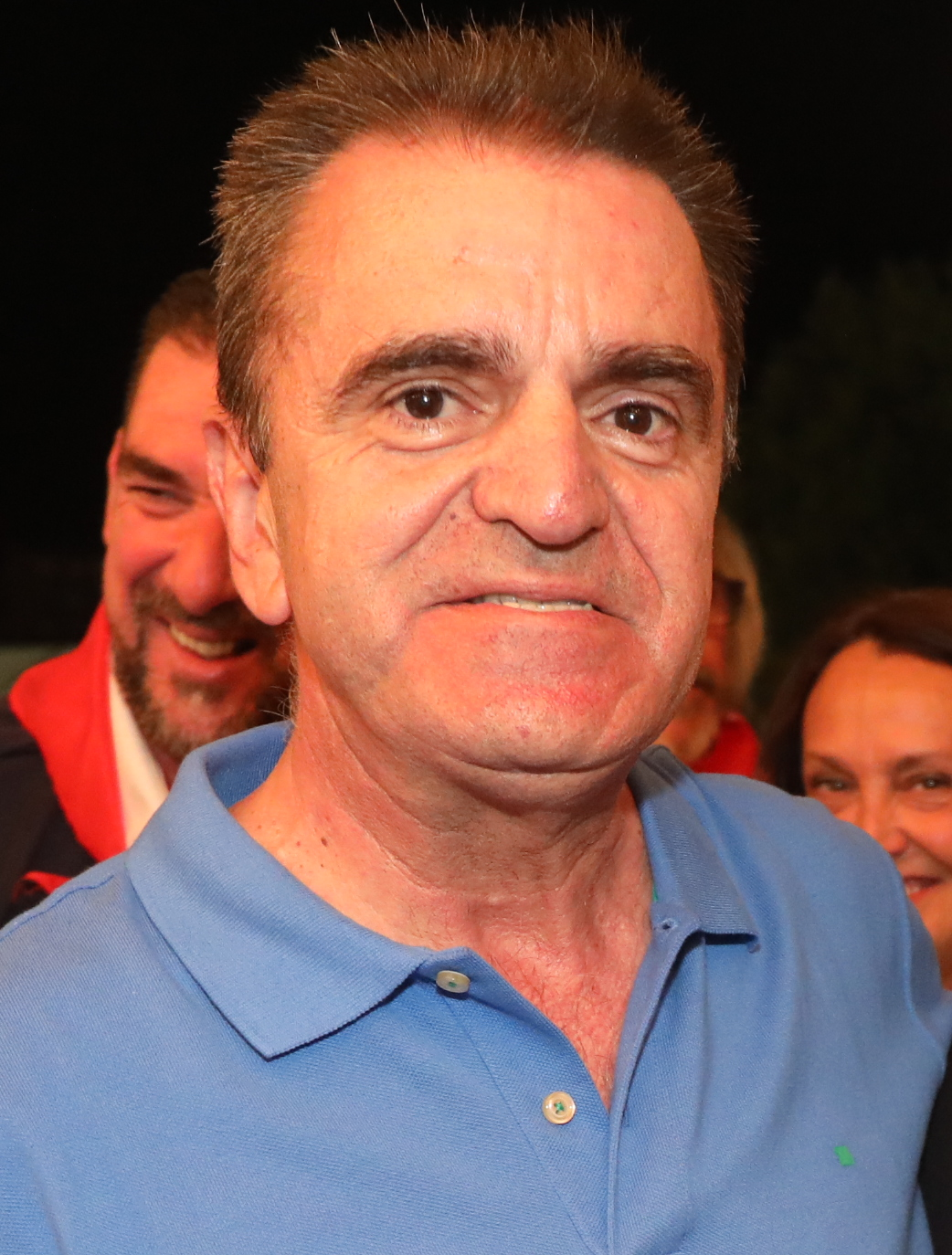
- In August 2018

President of the National Sports Council
- In office 31 March 2021 – 16 June 2023
- Preceded by: Irene Lozano

Member of the Congress of Deputies
- In office 21 May 2019 – 11 February 2020
- Constituency: Madrid

Member of the Assembly of Madrid
- In office 22 June 1995 – 2 April 2019

Member of the Monforte de Lemos City Council
- In office 1984–1986

Personal details
- Born: 8 September 1957 (age 68) A Pobra do Brollón
- Citizenship: Spanish
- Party: PSOE (since 1981)
- Occupation: Politician, civil servant, teacher

José Manuel Franco Pardo (born 1957) is a Spanish politician. A member of the Spanish Socialist Workers' Party (PSOE), he has been the Secretary-General of the PSOE of the Community of Madrid since September 2017. Since 2021, he is the president of the Consejo Superior de Deportes.

== Early life ==
Born in A Pobra do Brollón (province of Lugo) on 8 September 1957, soon after his family moved to Monforte de Lemos. Franco, who dropped university studies in Mathematics early, graduated in law. (Note: From 1995 to 2003 his CV as member of the Assembly of Madrid featured a wrong degree in Mathematics. Corrected from 2003 forward, this caused stir in the media in 2018, as it was revealed in the wider context of the Cifuentes scandal regarding academic titles, and the alleged fraudulent obtention of one of them by the then president of the Community of Madrid, Cristina Cifuentes.) From 1982 to 1987 he worked as math teacher. He is a career civil servant in the Ministry of Defence. Franco, who had joined the Spanish Socialist Workers' Party (PSOE) in 1981, was a member of the Monforte de Lemos city council from 1984 to 1986.

== Regional MP ==
He became a member of the Assembly of Madrid for the first time after the 1995 regional election. He renovated his seat in the 1999, May 2003, October 2003, 2007, 2011 and 2015 elections.

During this spell in the regional legislature, he has served as PSOE spokesperson in the Job Commission, president of the Budget Commission, and as spokesman in the Commission of Transport and Infrastructures. After the forced resignation of Tomás Gómez in February 2015, he became the spokesman of the parliamentary group. After the 2015 election, he became deputy spokesman second to Ángel Gabilondo.

== PSOE regional leader in Madrid ==
In 2017, Franco endorsed Pedro Sánchez in the PSOE primary election campaign, becoming one of Sánchez's most trusted advisors during the campaign. Franco defended the notion that in a federal plurinational state result of a potential reform of the Constitution, Madrid, as one of the entities of that State, in the case it had to be a "nation", so be it, "we should not be scared of the name". He contested the September 2017 primary election to the leadership of the Spanish Socialist Workers' Party of the Community of Madrid (PSOE-M). He won the process (with a support of the 71% of the voters) and became the new Secretary-General of the organization.

== Notes ==
Political offices
Preceded by María Paz García Vera	Government Delegate in the Community of Madrid; 2020-2021	Succeeded by Mercedes Fernández
Preceded by Irene Lozano	President of the National Sports Council; 2021-2023	Incumbent
Party political offices
Preceded by Tomás Gómez Franco	Leader of the Socialist Group in the Assembly of Madrid; 2015	Succeeded by Ángel Gabilondo
Preceded by Sara Hernández Barroso	Secretary-General of the Socialist Workers' Party of the Community of Madrid; 2017-2021	Succeeded by Juan Lobato
