= Spanish Socialist Workers' Party of the Community of Madrid =

Spanish Socialist Workers' Party of the Community of Madrid Partido Socialista Obrero Español de la Comunidad de Madrid
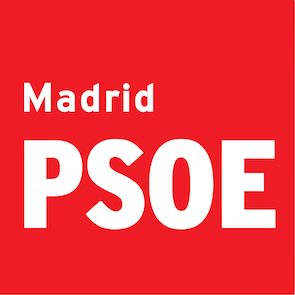
- President: Isaura Leal
- Secretary-General: Óscar López
- Founded: 1879
- Headquarters: Pza. Callao 4; 28013 Madrid, Spain
- Membership (2014): 15,830
- Ideology: Social democracy
- Political position: Centre-left
- National affiliation: Spanish Socialist Workers' Party
- Colors: Red
- Assembly of Madrid: 27 / 135
- Congress of Deputies: 10 / 37
- Senate: 4 / 11
- Local Government (2015-2019): 653 / 1,967

Website
- www.psoemadrid.es

The Spanish Socialist Workers' Party of the Community of Madrid (Spanish: Partido Socialista Obrero Español de la Comunidad de Madrid, PSOE–M), from 2004 to 2015 the Socialist Party of Madrid (Spanish: Partido Socialista de Madrid, PSM–PSOE) and previously the Madrilenian Socialist Federation (Spanish: Federación Socialista Madrileña), is the branch of the Spanish Socialist Workers' Party (PSOE) in the Madrid region.

== Electoral performance ==
=== Assembly of Madrid ===
Assembly of Madrid
Election	Votes	%	#	Seats	+/–	Leading candidate	Status
1983	1,181,277	50.48%	1st	51 / 94	—	Joaquín Leguina	Government
1987	932,878	38.45%	1st	40 / 96	11	Joaquín Leguina	Government
1991	820,510	36.59%	2nd	41 / 101	1	Joaquín Leguina	Government
1995	860,726	29.72%	2nd	32 / 103	9	Joaquín Leguina	Opposition
1999	944,819	36.43%	2nd	39 / 102	7	Cristina Almeida	Opposition
2003 (May)	1,225,390	39.99%	2nd	47 / 111	8	Rafael Simancas	New election
2003 (Oct)	1,083,205	39.00%	2nd	45 / 111	2	Rafael Simancas	Opposition
2007	1,002,862	33.57%	2nd	42 / 120	3	Rafael Simancas	Opposition
2011	786,297	26.27%	2nd	36 / 129	6	Tomás Gómez	Opposition
2015	807,385	25.43%	2nd	37 / 129	1	Ángel Gabilondo	Opposition
2019	884,218	27.31%	1st	37 / 132	0	Ángel Gabilondo	Opposition
2021	612,622	16.80%	3rd	24 / 136	13	Ángel Gabilondo	Opposition
2023	609,718	18.19%	3rd	27 / 135	3	Juan Lobato	Opposition

=== Cortes Generales ===
Cortes Generales
Election	Community of Madrid						
Election	Congress					Senate	
Election	Votes	%	#	Seats	+/–	Seats	+/–
1977	731,380	31.68%	2nd	11 / 32	—	1 / 4	—
1979	769,328	33.34%	1st	12 / 32	1	2 / 4	1
1982	1,439,137	52.09%	1st	18 / 32	6	3 / 4	1
1986	1,054,730	40.81%	1st	15 / 33	3	3 / 4	0
1989	899,723	33.49%	2nd	12 / 33	3	1 / 4	2
1993	1,093,015	34.96%	2nd	13 / 34	1	1 / 4	0
1996	1,046,904	31.42%	2nd	11 / 34	2	1 / 4	0
2000	1,023,212	33.06%	2nd	12 / 34	1	1 / 4	0
2004	1,544,676	44.11%	2nd	16 / 35	4	1 / 4	0
2008	1,401,785	39.68%	2nd	15 / 35	1	1 / 4	0
2011	878,724	26.05%	2nd	10 / 36	5	1 / 4	0
2015	645,645	17.84%	4th	6 / 36	4	0 / 4	1
2016	678,340	19.57%	3rd	7 / 36	1	1 / 4	1
2019 (Apr)	1,031,534	27.27%	1st	11 / 37	4	2 / 4	1
2019 (Nov)	957,401	26.87%	1st	10 / 37	1	2 / 4	0

=== European Parliament ===
European Parliament
Election	Community of Madrid		
Election	Votes	%	#
1987	979,143	40.38%	1st
1989	751,937	35.47%	1st
1994	577,509	24.00%	2nd
1999	954,721	36.84%	2nd
2004	941,954	42.86%	2nd
2009	815,699	35.61%	2nd
2014	420,594	18.95%	2nd
2019	1,043,827	32.30%	1st

== Leadership since 1977 ==
The list of leaders of the PSOE regional party branches in Madrid since 1977 is as follows:

- Alonso Puerta (1977–1979)
- Joaquín Leguina (1979–1991)
- Teófilo Serrano (1991–1994)
- Jaime Lissavetzky (1994–2000)
- Rafael Simancas (2000-2007)
- Caretaker commission presided by Cristina Narbona (June–July 2007)
- Tomás Gómez (2007–2015)
- Caretaker commission presided by Rafael Simancas (February–July 2015)
- Sara Hernández (2015–2017)
- José Manuel Franco (2017–2021)
- Juan Lobato (2021–2024)

== 2021 primary election ==
Following the party's poor results in the May 2021 regional election, José Manuel Franco resigned from the post of Secretary-General. The PSOE's federal executive committee then appointed a PSOE–M managing committee led by Isaura Leal. Three pre-candidates collected endorsements to run in the primary election for post of Secretary–General: Eva Llarandi (PSOE's Secretary General in Paracuellos), Javier Ayala (Mayor of Fuenlabrada), and Juan Lobato (former Mayor of Soto del Real).
