= Luis de Velasco Rami =

Spanish politician (born 1939)

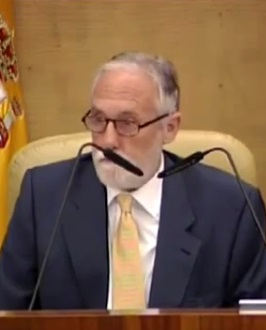
- Luis de Velasco in 2011

Member of the Madrid Assembly
- In office June 2011 – March 2015

Deputy in the Congress of Spain
- In office 22 June 1986 – 28 October 1989
- Constituency: Navarre

Secretary of State of Commerce of Spain
- In office 1982–1986

President of National Institute of foment of exports
- In office 1982–1986

Personal details
- Born: Luis de Velasco Rami; 26 January 1939 (age 87) Valencia, Spain
- Party: PSOE (1976-1994); UPyD (since 2008)
- Occupation: Economist
- Website: luisdevelasco.wordpress.com

Luis de Velasco Rami (born 1939 in Valencia) is a Spanish economist, essayist and politician. A former deputy and Secretary of State of Commerce with the Spanish Socialist Workers' Party (PSOE), he is now affiliated to and a member of the Directive Council of Union, Progress and Democracy (UPyD).

== Biography ==
Born in Valencia in 1939, he lived there until 1961, when he got a degree in law at the University of Valencia. Thereafter, he lived in London and Dublin for two years, and in 1964 he passed the civil service exams and entered the Ministry of Commerce. At the same time, he got a degree in economics.

Between 1967 and 1973 he lived in Chile, working in the Office of Commerce of Spain in the country. After that, in 1976 he returned to Spain, and he joined the PSOE. He was a deputy in the Congress from 1986 to 1989, representing Navarre and Secretary of State of Commerce, but in 1994 he quit the party on ideological grounds.

He was a member of the 9th Madrid Assembly. He was the UPyD candidate for the presidency of the region of Madrid. He got more than 6% of the vote, finishing fourth, and entering the Madrid Assembly with 8 deputies.

On October 23, 2010, he was elected head of the UPyD list for the 2011 elections to the Assembly of Madrid in primary elections.

The candidacy headed by Luis de Velasco achieved 6.30% of the votes and obtained eight deputies in the Assembly of Madrid in the elections held on May 22, 2011.

== Books ==
- “Políticas del PSOE 1982-1995. Del “cambio” a la decepción” (1996)
- “La democracia plana” (1999) (en colaboración con José Antonio Gimbernat)
- “No son sólo algunas manzanas podridas. Sobre las causas últimas de la crisis financiera en EEUU” (2010)
