= Official Gazette of the Community of Madrid =

Government gazette of the Community of Madrid, Spain

Boletín Oficial de la Comunidad de Madrid
- Publisher: Organismo Autónomo Boletín Oficial de la Comunidad de Madrid
- General manager: Pilar Liébana Soto (organismo autónomo)
- Founded: 16 June 1983; 42 years ago
- Language: Spanish
- ISSN: 1889-4410

The Official Bulletin of the Community of Madrid (Spanish: Boletín Oficial de la Comunidad de Madrid; BOCM) is the government gazette of the regional administration of the Community of Madrid, Spain. According to the article #40 of the regional statute of the Community of Madrid, the BOCM publishes the laws passed by the Assembly of Madrid and the rulings issued by the Government of the Community of Madrid.

It was first published on 16 June 1983, and it came to replace the Official Bulletin of the Province of Madrid, the 150 year-long gazette of the Provincial Deputation of Madrid.

It adheres to the following general structure:

I. Sumario (Summary).
II. Comunidad de Madrid (Community of Madrid)

1. Disposiciones Generales (General Provisions).
2. Autoridades y personal (Authorities and personnel).
3. Otras Disposiciones (Other Provisions).
4. Anuncios (Announcements).

III. Disposiciones y anuncios del Estado (State provisions and announcements).
IV. Administración local (Local administration).
V. Administración de Justicia (Administration of Justice).
VI. Otros anuncios (Other announcements).

It is typically published daily except Sundays, Good Friday, Christmas Day, and New Year's Day. Its premises are located at the calle de Valportillo in Alcobendas and at 51 calle de Fortuny in Madrid.
