= Francisco Granados =

Spanish politician

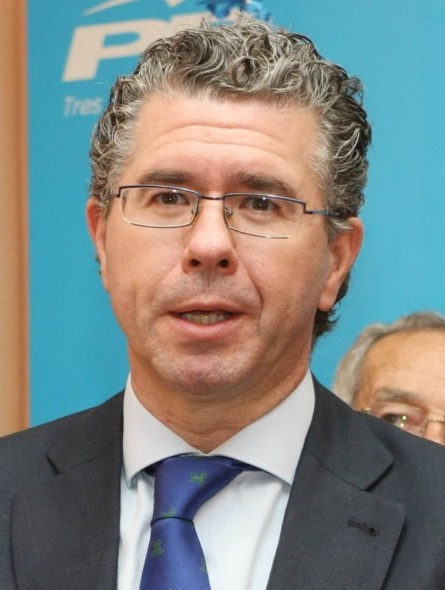
Granados in 2011

Francisco José Granados Lerena (Valdemoro, 23 January 1964) is a Spanish politician. Involved in the infamous "Púnica" corruption case (actually named after him in a pun) (Note: "Granados" is the plural common form for Punica granatum (pomegranate) in Spanish.) he was held in preventive detention from October 2014 to June 2017. A prominent figure of the People's Party of the Community of Madrid in his capacity as Esperanza Aguirre's lieutenant in the regional branch of the PP, he has served as Mayor of Valdemoro (1999–2003), Minister in the regional government of the Community of Madrid as well as a member of the regional legislature.
