= Pedro Muñoz Abrines =

Spanish politician (born 1967)

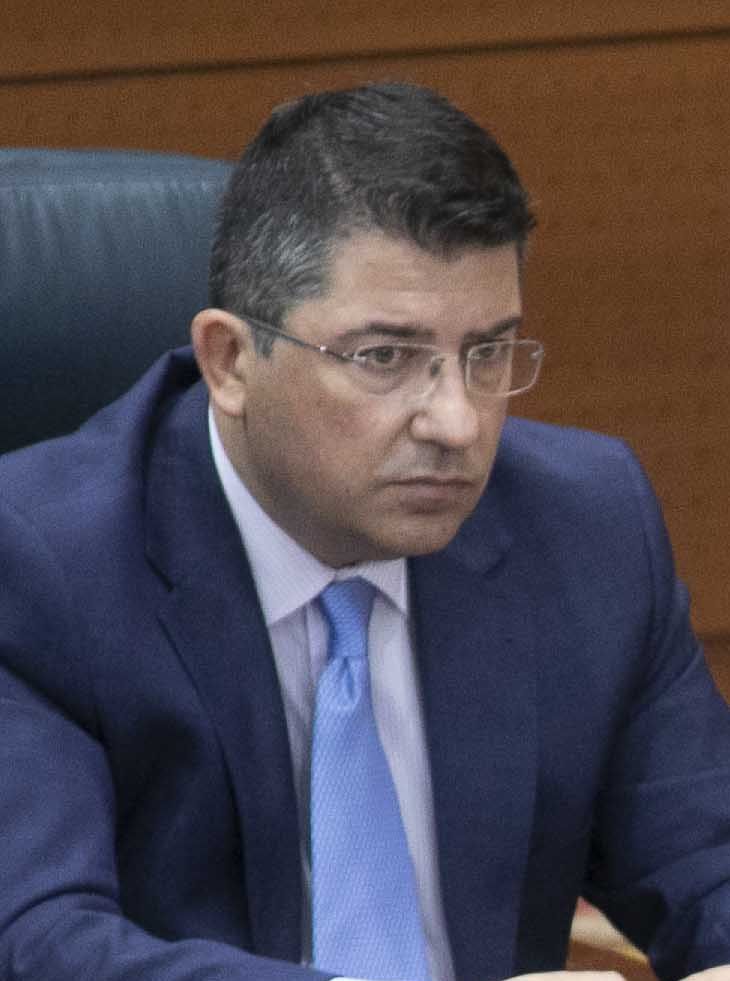
- Muñoz in 2018

Member of the Congress of Deputies
- Incumbent
- Assumed office 17 August 2023
- Constituency: Madrid

Personal details
- Born: 9 August 1967 (age 58)
- Party: People's Party

Pedro Muñoz Abrines (born 9 August 1967) is a Spanish politician serving as a member of the Congress of Deputies since 2023. From 1991 to 2023, he was a member of the Assembly of Madrid.
