= Luis Peral Guerra =

Spanish politician (born 1950)

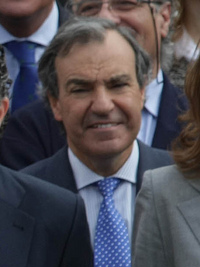
- In 2011

Senator
- In office 28 June 2007 – 8 July 2015

Minister of Education of the Community of Madrid
- In office 22 November 2003 – 20 June 2007
- Preceded by: Carlos Mayor Oreja
- Succeeded by: Lucía Figar

Minister of Labour of the Community of Madrid
- In office September 2001 – 2003

Member of the Assembly of Madrid
- In office 30 June 1999 – 9 January 2017

Madrid city councillor
- In office 9 April 1979 – 30 June 1987

Personal details
- Born: 5 November 1950 (age 75) Madrid
- Citizenship: Spanish
- Party: UCD, PDP, PP
- Occupation: Politician

Luis Peral Guerra (born 1950) is a Spanish Christian-Democrat politician. A former senator, city councillor of Madrid and member of the Assembly of Madrid, he served as Minister of Labor and Minister of Education of the Government of the Community of Madrid.

== Biography ==
Born on 5 November 1950 in Madrid, son of real estate developer and architect Luis Peral Buesa and Mariela Guerra Zunzunegui; he is the grandson of General Luis Peral Sáez, aide-de-camp of Francisco Franco and of Juan Bautista Guerra García, lawyer and Member of Parliament for Palencia from the CEDA, murdered at the Monte Saja (Cantabria) in October 1936, during the Civil War.

PhD in History, with International Mention, from Universidad CEU-San Pablo, Madrid. He was awarded a "Summa cum laude" for his thesis "Economic Policies of the Second Spanish Republic. Spain in the Great Depression". During the PhD program he has completed stays at the London School of Economics and at the University of Edinburgh.

He obtained before Master (Licenciado) degrees in Economics and in Law from Universidad Complutense de Madrid.

Professor of Contemporary Economic History at the Master of Contemporary History at Universidad CEU-San Pablo de Madrid.

A member of the City Council of Madrid between 1979 and 1987, he had been elected for the first time in the 1979 municipal election as candidate of the Union of the Democratic Centre (UCD); he renovated his seat for a second term in the 1983 election, this time as candidate of the electoral coalition between People's Alliance, the People's Democratic Party and the Liberal Union (AP-PDP-UL).

From June 1980 to November 1981 he was the Chief of the Technical Staff of the MInister of Transports, Tourism and Communications, José Luis Álvarez.

Following the 1995 accession of the People's Party (PP) to the Government of the Community of Madrid with 1995 Alberto Ruiz-Gallardón as regional president, Peral was appointed Vice-Minister of Public Works, Urbanism and Transports, becoming the right-hand of Luis Eduardo Cortés. From 1995 to 2001 the extension of Madrid underground Metro was doubled with 114 new kilometers. 101.000 new state-subsidized apartments were built, 12.663 of them by the Instituto de la Vivienda de Madrid (IVIMA) and 2.700 families that lived in shanty dwellings were housed in apartments by the Instituto de Realojamiento e Integración Social (IRIS). New roads were built, including M.45 Motorway, where the shadow toll system was employed.

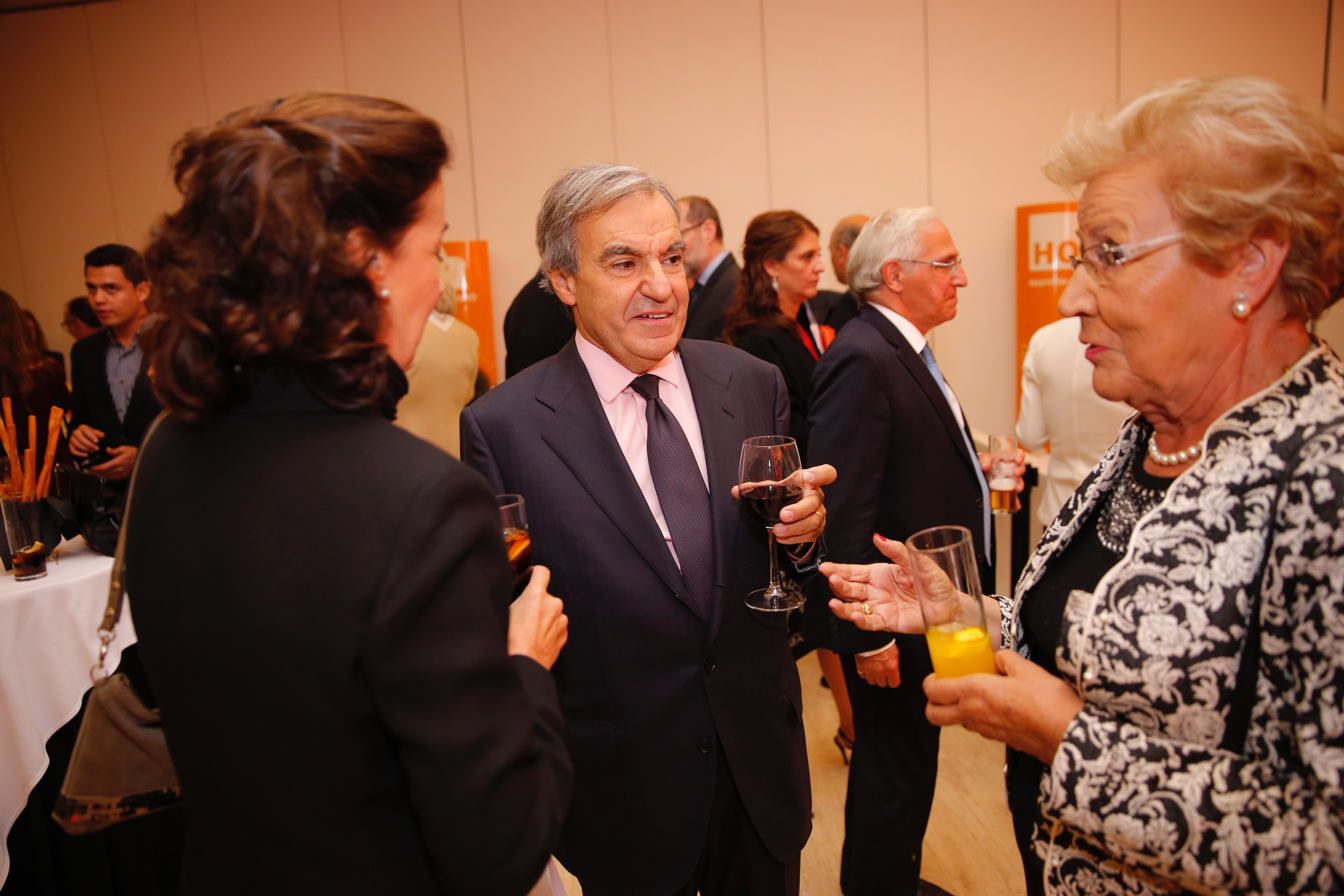
Peral in 2016 during the gala for the HazteOír Awards.

He ran as the 22nd candidate in the PP list for the 1999 regional election in Madrid, becoming a member of the regional legislature for the first time; he renovated the seat in the next five terms of the regional legislature.

In the context of a cabinet reshuffle that took place in September 2001 in which the number of regional government ministries increased from 9 to 11, Peral was appointed as the new Minister of Labor. While he headed the Labour Department occupational training was promoted as well as jobs for disabled persons, through the Regional Employment Service, as well as job safety with the negotiation with trade unions and employers of the first Regional Plan for the Prevention of Job Hazards.

Once the government of Esperanza Aguirre started, Peral became Minister of Education. He was the only minister from the Ruiz-Gallardón era, remaining in the cabinet after the transition of power in 2003. While he headed the Education Department 165 state owned educational centers were built (72 infant schools, 75 primary schools and 18 secondary schools), there were 53.000 new infant schools places for children from 0 to 3 years, the Spanish-English Bilingual Program was developed, as well as the new Priority State Schools Plan. School grants for meals and textbooks were very much increased. In March 2005 the Education Department and 19 entities from the educational community signed the Agreement for the Improvement of the Educational Quality 2005-2008, with a budget of 1.600 million euros. In October of the same year took place the signing of the Financing Plan for Madrid Region Public Universities 2006-2010 and in December 2006 the Investment Plan 2007-2011 for those universities was signed.

During the Aguirre Government, in his capacity as regional minister of Education, he chaired the board of trustees of the Cardenal Cisneros Foundation (owner of the Centro de Enseñanza Superior Cardenal Cisneros).

Between 2007 and 2015, during the 8th, 9th and 10th terms of the Cortes Generales, Peral served as Senator, designated by the regional legislature. Spokesman of the Partido Popular (PP) for Interior (2008-2011) and Education (2011-2015), he took part representing the PP in the Traffic Law modification in 2009, in the 2010 Asylum Law and in the 2013 Law for the Improvement of Quality in Education (LOMCE). He promoted amendments in the modifications of the Penal Code in 2010 and 2015 (especially in the articles related with human trafficking and sexual crimes against minors), in the 2009 Immigration Law and in the 2010 Abortion Law. During the X Legislature, Luis Peral made 15 parliamentary questions in the Senate Plenary sessions and 138 in the Senate Committees and promoted 3 Motions in Plenary sessions and 4 in Committees, including a Motion about support to the Family, a Motion for the dissolution of city councils governed by the political arm of ETA terrorist group, according to the Political Parties Law and a Motion about Human Rights Violations in Central Africa.

A member of the sector of the PP opposed to abortion and surrogacy, during his mandate as Minister of Education (2003–2007) the region delayed the implementation of the subject of Educación para la Ciudadanía promoted by the national government of José Luis Rodríguez Zapatero. (Note: He also personally awarded the Ultra-Conservative lobby HazteOir in 2004. He claimed the decision had been taken by a jury.) Peral broke the party discipline in July 2016 when he deliberately missed the voting for the Law against the LGTB-Phobia promoted by the PP government presided by Cristina Cifuentes, after his request for a separate voting for 6 of the 81 articles of that law was rejected by the PP parliamentary group. He resigned his seat as member of the Assembly in December 2016 alleging "personal reasons", and also announced the end of his political activity.

Member of the Board of the Foundations Educación y Evangelio, Horizontes Abiertos and NEOS and of the Consejo Nacional de la Asociación Católica de Propagandistas (ACdP).

== Bibliography ==
- Muñoz Ramírez, Alicia (2016). Movilización contra educación para la ciudadanía y los derechos humanos. Castilla-la Mancha, Castilla y León y Madrid. Universidad de Salamanca. ISBN 978-84-9012-601-1.
