= Government of Ignacio González =

- 9th Government of the Community of Madrid
- 2012–2015
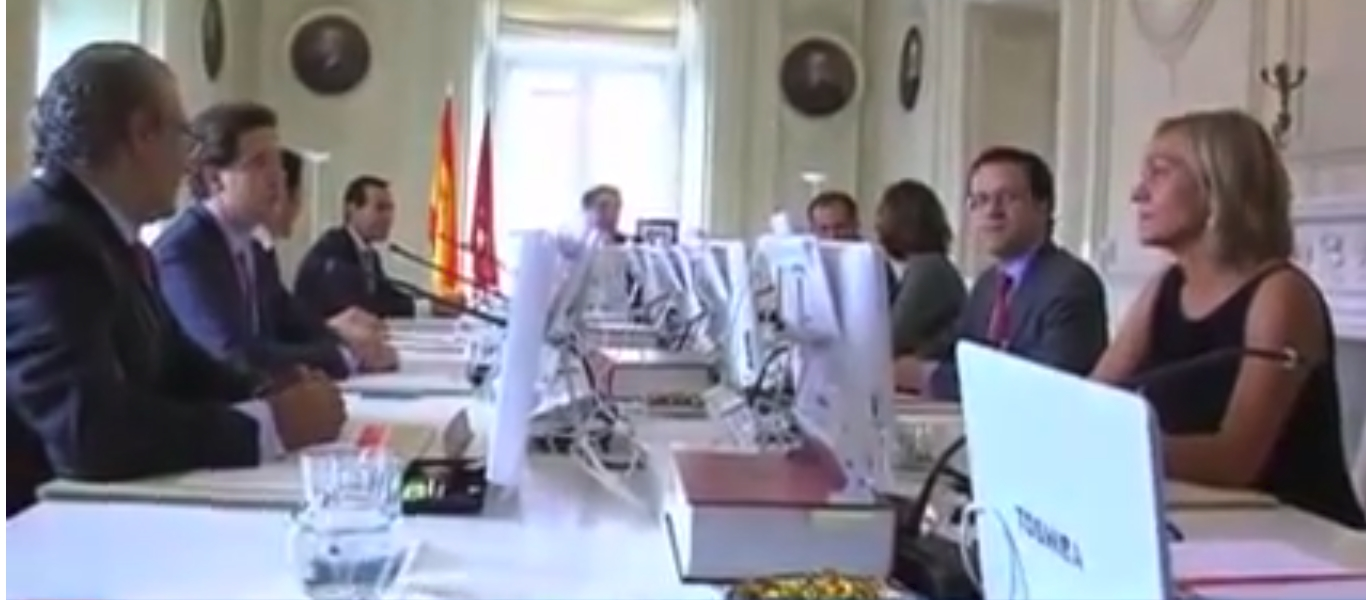
- The government in October 2012.
- Date formed: 28 September 2012
- Date dissolved: 26 June 2015

People and organisations
- Monarch: Juan Carlos I (2012–2014); Felipe VI (2014–2015)
- President: Ignacio González
- No. of ministers: 8 (Note: Does not include the President.)
- Total no. of members: 12
- Member party: PP
- Status in legislature: Majority government
- Opposition party: PSOE
- Opposition leader: Tomás Gómez (2012–2015); José Manuel Franco (2015)

History
- Outgoing election: 2015 regional election
- Legislature term: 9th Assembly
- Budget: 2013, 2014, 2015
- Predecessor: Aguirre III
- Successor: Cifuentes

The government of Ignacio González was formed on 28 September 2012, following the latter's election as President of the Community of Madrid by the Assembly of Madrid on 26 September and his swearing-in on 27 September, as a result of the resignation of the former president, Esperanza Aguirre, out of personal motives. It succeeded the third Aguirre government and was the Government of the Community of Madrid from 28 September 2012 to 26 June 2015, a total of 1,001 days, or 2 years, 8 months and 29 days.

The cabinet comprised members of the PP and a number of independents. It was automatically dismissed on 25 May 2015 as a consequence of the 2015 regional election, but remained in acting capacity until the next government was sworn in.

== Investiture ==
Investiture; Ignacio González (PP)
Ballot →	26 September 2012
Required majority →	65 out of 129
Yes: • PP (72)	72 / 129
No: • PSOE (34); • IUCM–LV (11); • UPyD (8)	53 / 129
Abstentions	0 / 129
Absentees: • PSOE (2); • IUCM–LV (2)	4 / 129

== Cabinet changes ==
González's government saw a number of cabinet changes during its tenure:

- On 27 January 2014, Minister of Health Javier Fernández-Lasquetty announced his resignation from the post after a decision from the Superior Court of Justice of Madrid to maintain the precautionary suspension of the outsourcing process of six public hospitals in Madrid. He was replaced by Javier Rodríguez.
- On 4 December 2014, Javier Rodríguez was dismissed as Health minister after being questioned by health professionals and the opposition for a number of controversial statements on the Ebola-infected nurse during the virus disease crisis in Spain. He was replaced in his post by Javier Maldonado.

From 25 May 2015, González's cabinet took on acting duties for the duration of the government formation process resulting from the 2015 regional election.

- On 4 June, two ministers renounced their posts: Salvador Victoria (Presidency, Justice and Spokesperson) and Lucía Figar (Education, Youth and Sports), who had been indicted for their alleged involvement in the Púnica affair. They were replaced four days later in acting capacity by Javier Hernández Martínez and Manuel Pérez Gómez, respectively.

== Council of Government ==
The Council of Government was structured into the office for the president of the Community of Madrid and eight ministries.

← González Government → (28 September 2012 – 26 June 2015)
Portfolio	Name	Party	Took office	Left office	Ref.
President	Ignacio González	PP	27 September 2012	25 June 2015	
Minister of the Presidency, Justice and Spokesperson of the Government	Salvador Victoria	PP	28 September 2012	4 June 2015	
Minister of Economy and Finance	Enrique Ossorio	PP	28 September 2012	26 June 2015	
Minister of Transport, Infrastructures and Housing	Pablo Cavero	PP	28 September 2012	26 June 2015	
Minister of Education, Youth and Sports	Lucía Figar	PP	28 September 2012	4 June 2015	
Minister of the Environment and Territory Planning	Borja Sarasola	PP	28 September 2012	26 June 2015	
Minister of Health	Javier Fernández-Lasquetty	PP	28 September 2012	27 January 2014	
Minister of Social Affairs	Jesús Fermosel	PP	28 September 2012	26 June 2015	
Minister of Employment, Tourism and Culture	Ana Isabel Mariño	PP	28 September 2012	26 June 2015	
=== Changes January 2014 ===
Portfolio	Name	Party	Took office	Left office	Ref.
Minister of Health	Javier Rodríguez	PP	28 January 2014	4 December 2014	
=== Changes December 2014 ===
Portfolio	Name	Party	Took office	Left office	Ref.
Minister of Health	Javier Maldonado	PP (Ind.)	4 December 2014	26 June 2015	
=== Changes 2015 ===
Portfolio	Name	Party	Took office	Left office	Ref.
Minister of the Presidency, Justice and Spokesperson of the Government	Javier Hernández Martínez was appointed as acting officeholder from 8 to 26 June 2015.				
Minister of Education, Youth and Sports	Manuel Pérez Gómez was appointed as acting officeholder from 8 to 26 June 2015.				

== Notes ==
Preceded by Aguirre III	Government of the Community of Madrid; 2012–2015	Succeeded by Cifuentes
