= Government of Ángel Garrido =

- 11th Government of the Community of Madrid
- 2018–2019
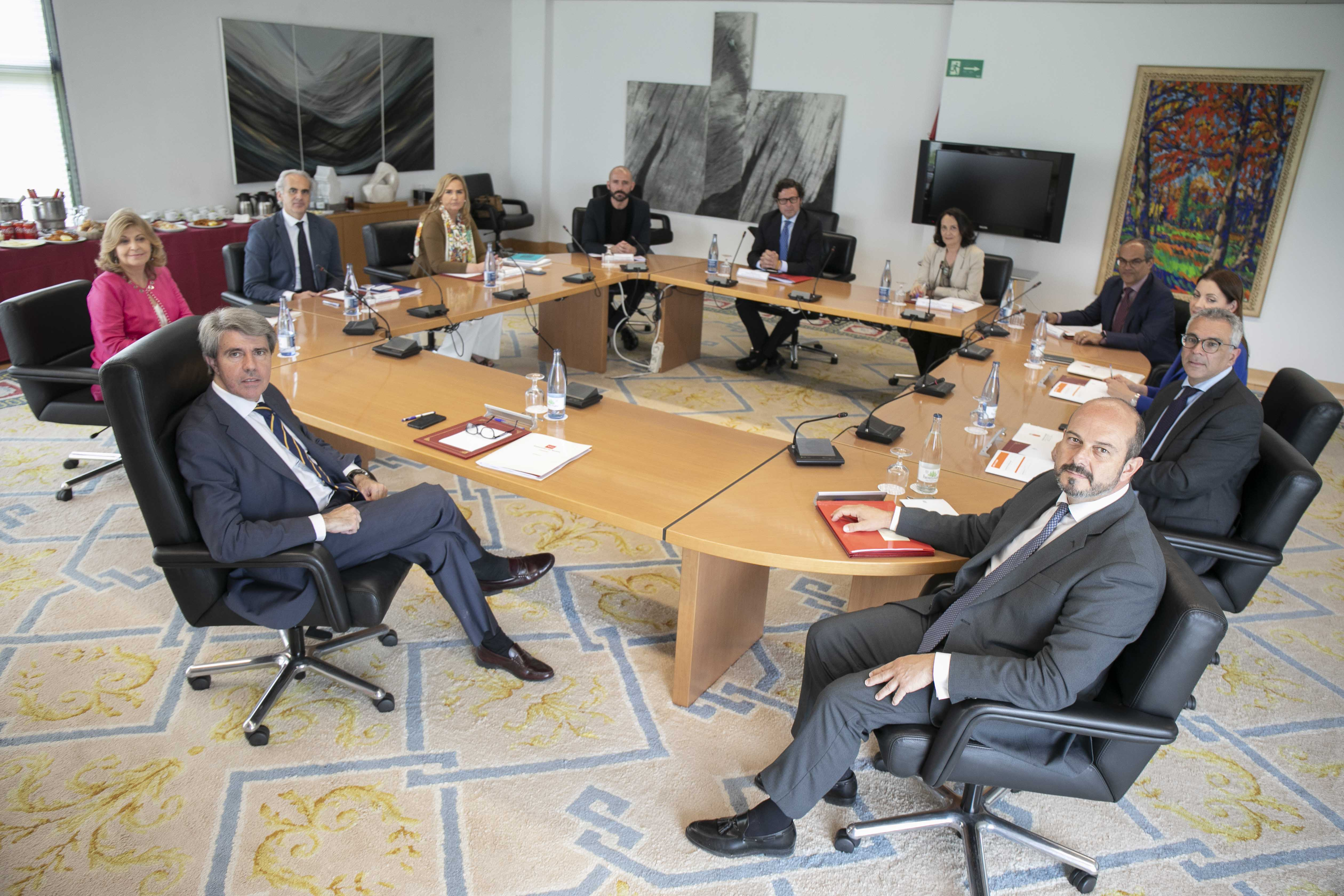
- The government in May 2018.
- Date formed: 22 May 2018
- Date dissolved: 20 August 2019

People and organisations
- Monarch: Felipe VI
- President: Ángel Garrido (2018–2019); Pedro Rollán (2019; acting)
- Vice President: Pedro Rollán
- No. of ministers: 9 (Note: Does not include the President.)
- Total no. of members: 9
- Member party: PP
- Status in legislature: Minority government
- Opposition party: PSOE
- Opposition leader: Ángel Gabilondo

History
- Outgoing election: 2019 regional election
- Legislature term: 10th Assembly
- Predecessor: Cifuentes
- Successor: Ayuso I

The government of Ángel Garrido was formed on 22 May 2018, following the latter's election as President of the Community of Madrid by the Assembly of Madrid on 18 May and his swearing-in on 21 May, as a result of the resignation of the former president, Cristina Cifuentes, over a string of scandals involving the fraudulent obtention of a master's degree, the subsequent document forgery to cover it up and the leaking of a 2011 shoplifting video in which she was involved. It succeeded the Cifuentes government and was the Government of the Community of Madrid from 22 May 2018 to 20 August 2019, a total of 455 days, or 1 year, 3 months and 2 days.

The cabinet comprised members of the PP and a number of independents. It was automatically dismissed on 13 April 2019 as a consequence of Garrido's resignation as president in order to run in his party's lists to the 2019 European Parliament election, but remained in acting capacity until the next government was sworn in. Two weeks later, and just four days ahead of the April 2019 Spanish general election, Garrido defected to the Citizens (Cs) party.

== Investiture ==
Investiture; Ángel Garrido (PP)
Ballot →	18 May 2018
Required majority →	65 out of 129
Yes: • PP (48); • C's (17)	65 / 129
No: • PSOE (37); • Podemos (27)	64 / 129
Abstentions	0 / 129
Absentees	0 / 129

== Cabinet changes ==
The only change during the tenure of Garrido's government was the resignation of Ángel Garrido himself on 11 April 2019 in order to be able to be included within the People's Party (PP)'s lists to the 2019 European Parliament election as a result of the law barring incumbent members of regional members from running. A mere two weeks later on 24 April, and just a couple of days ahead of the April 2019 Spanish general election, Garrido announced his defection to Citizens (Cs).

As a result of the president's resignation, the whole cabinet was forced to step down on 13 April and remain in acting capacity until a new government was sworn in, with vice president and minister of the presidency Pedro Rollán serving as acting president in the meantime.

== Council of Government ==
The Council of Government was structured into the office for the president, the vice president and nine ministries.

← Garrido Government → (22 May 2018 – 20 August 2019)
Portfolio	Name	Party	Took office	Left office	Ref.
President	Ángel Garrido	PP	19 May 2018	11 April 2019	
President	Pedro Rollán served in acting capacity from 11 April to 17 August 2019.				
Vice President, Minister of the Presidency and Spokesperson of the Government	Pedro Rollán	PP	22 May 2018	20 August 2019	
Minister of Economy, Employment and Finance	Engracia Hidalgo	PP	22 May 2018	20 August 2019	
Minister of the Environment and Territory Planning	Carlos Izquierdo Torres	PP	22 May 2018	20 August 2019	
Minister of Health	Enrique Ruiz Escudero	PP	22 May 2018	20 August 2019	
Minister of Social Policies and Family	María Dolores Moreno	PP (Ind.)	22 May 2018	20 August 2019	
Minister of Transport, Housing and Infrastructures	Rosalía Gonzalo	PP	22 May 2018	20 August 2019	
Minister of Education and Research	Rafael van Grieken	PP (Ind.)	22 May 2018	20 August 2019	
Minister of Culture, Tourism and Sports	Jaime Miguel de los Santos	PP (Ind.)	22 May 2018	20 August 2019	
Minister of Justice	Yolanda Ibarrola	PP (Ind.)	22 May 2018	20 August 2019	

== Notes ==
Preceded by Cifuentes	Government of the Community of Madrid; 2018–2019	Succeeded by Ayuso I
