= Third government of Esperanza Aguirre =

3rd government of Esperanza Aguirre
- 8th Government of the Community of Madrid
- 2011–2012
- Date formed: 17 June 2011
- Date dissolved: 28 September 2012

People and organisations
- Monarch: Juan Carlos I
- President: Esperanza Aguirre (2011–2012); Ignacio González (2012; acting)
- Vice President: Ignacio González
- No. of ministers: 8 (Note: Does not include the President.)
- Total no. of members: 9
- Member party: PP
- Status in legislature: Majority government
- Opposition party: PSOE
- Opposition leader: Tomás Gómez

History
- Election: 2011 regional election
- Legislature term: 9th Assembly
- Predecessor: Aguirre II
- Successor: González

The third government of Esperanza Aguirre was formed on 17 June 2011, following her election as President of the Community of Madrid by the Assembly of Madrid on 15 June and her swearing-in on the next day, as a result of the People's Party (PP) emerging as the largest parliamentary force at the 2011 Madrilenian regional election with a third straight absolute majority of seats. It succeeded the second Aguirre government and was the Government of the Community of Madrid from 17 June 2011 to 28 September 2012, a total of 469 days.

The cabinet comprised only members of the PP. It was automatically dismissed on 27 September 2012 when Aguirre resigned as president, but remained in acting capacity until the next government was sworn in.

== Investiture ==
Investiture; Esperanza Aguirre (PP)
Ballot →	15 June 2011
Required majority →	65 out of 129
Yes: • PP (72)	72 / 129
No: • PSOE (36); • IUCM–LV (13); • UPyD (8)	57 / 129
Abstentions	0 / 129
Absentees	0 / 129

== Council of Government ==
The Council of Government was structured into the offices for the president, the vice president and eight ministries.

← Aguirre III Government → (17 June 2011 – 28 September 2012)
Portfolio	Name	Party	Took office	Left office	Ref.
President	Esperanza Aguirre	PP	16 June 2011	17 September 2012	
President	Ignacio González served in acting capacity from 17 to 27 September 2012.				
Vice President and Spokesperson of the Government; Minister of Culture and Sports	Ignacio González	PP	17 June 2011	28 September 2012	
Minister of the Presidency and Justice	Regina Plañiol	PP	17 June 2011	28 September 2012	
Minister of Economy and Finance	Percival Manglano	PP	17 June 2011	28 September 2012	
Minister of Transport and Infrastructures	Antonio Beteta	PP	17 June 2011	24 December 2011	
Minister of Education and Employment	Lucía Figar	PP	17 June 2011	28 September 2012	
Minister of Environment and Territory Planning	Ana Isabel Mariño	PP	17 June 2011	28 September 2012	
Minister of Health	Javier Fernández-Lasquetty	PP	17 June 2011	28 September 2012	
Minister of Social Affairs	Salvador Victoria	PP	17 June 2011	28 September 2012	
=== Changes December 2011 ===
Portfolio	Name	Party	Took office	Left office	Ref.
Minister of Transport and Infrastructures	Regina Plañiol took on the ordinary discharge of duties from 24 December to 25 January 2012.				
Minister of Transport and Infrastructures	Pablo Cavero	PP	25 January 2012	28 September 2012	

== Notes ==
Preceded by Aguirre II	Government of the Community of Madrid; 2011–2012	Succeeded by González
