= Government of Cristina Cifuentes =

- 10th Government of the Community of Madrid
- 2015–2018
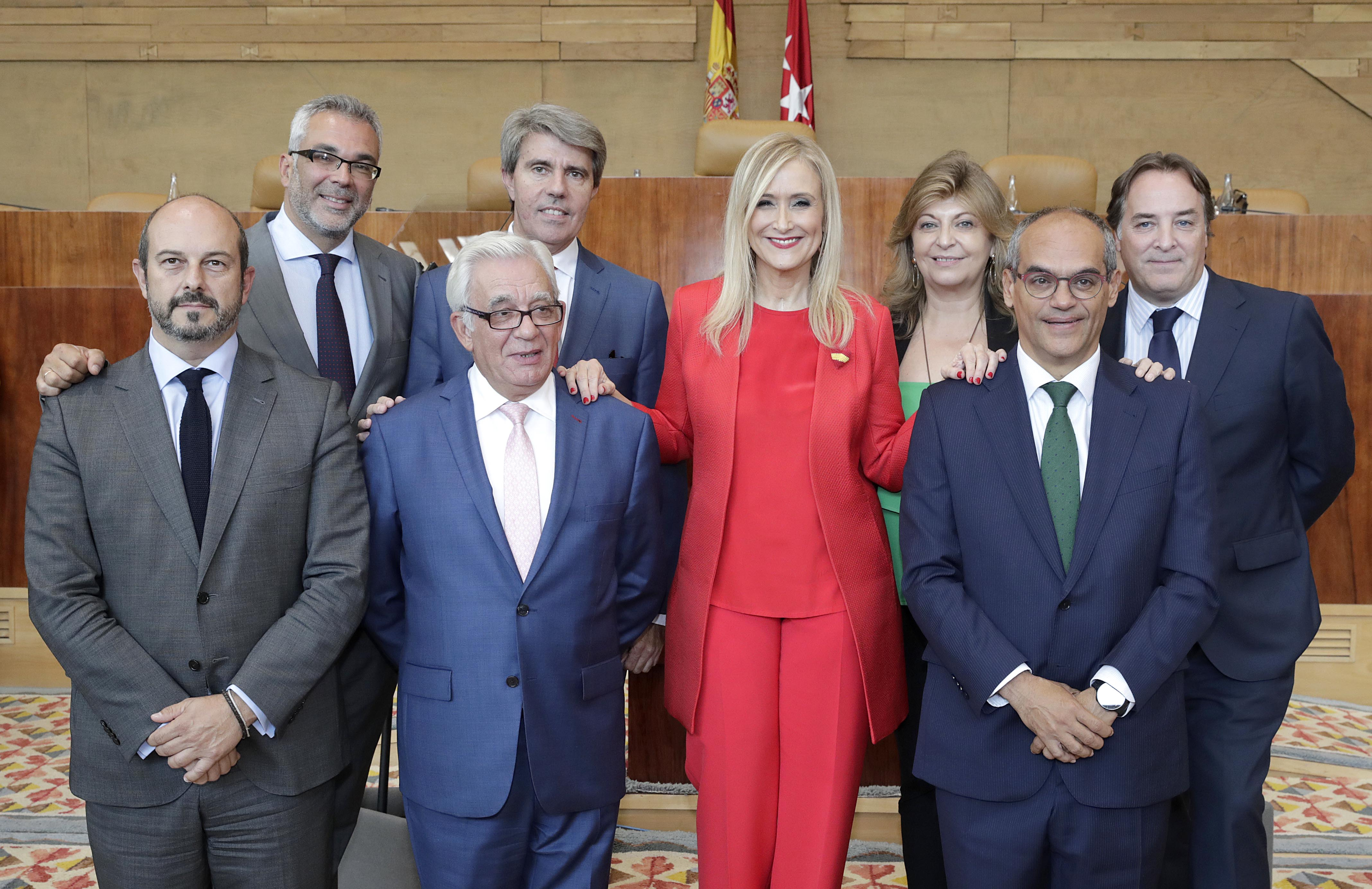
- The government in September 2017.
- Date formed: 26 June 2015
- Date dissolved: 22 May 2018

People and organisations
- Monarch: Felipe VI
- President: Cristina Cifuentes (2015–2018); Ángel Garrido (2018; acting)
- No. of ministers: 7 (Note: Does not include the President.) (2015–2017); 8 (2017–2018)
- Total no. of members: 10
- Member party: PP
- Status in legislature: Minority government
- Opposition party: PSOE
- Opposition leader: Ángel Gabilondo

History
- Election: 2015 regional election
- Legislature term: 10th Assembly
- Budget: 2016, 2017, 2018
- Predecessor: González
- Successor: Garrido

The government of Cristina Cifuentes was formed on 26 June 2015, following the latter's election as President of the Community of Madrid by the Assembly of Madrid on 24 June and her swearing-in on 25 June, as a result of the People's Party (PP) emerging as the largest parliamentary force at the 2015 Madrilenian regional election. It succeeded the González government and was the Government of the Community of Madrid from 26 June 2015 to 22 May 2018, a total of 1,061 days, or 2 years, 10 months and 26 days.

The cabinet comprised members of the PP and a number of independents. It was automatically dismissed on 28 April 2018 as a consequence of Cifuentes's resignation as president, but remained in acting capacity until the next government was sworn in.

== Investiture ==
Investiture; Cristina Cifuentes (PP)
Ballot →	24 June 2015
Required majority →	65 out of 129
Yes: • PP (48); • C's (17)	65 / 129
No: • PSOE (37); • Podemos (27)	64 / 129
Abstentions	0 / 129
Absentees	0 / 129

== Cabinet changes ==
Cifuentes's government saw a number of cabinet changes during its tenure:

- On 23 September 2017, it was announced that the Environment, Local Administration and Territory Planning and Health ministers, Jaime González Taboada and Jesús Sánchez Martos respectively, would be removed from office, effective from 25 September, as a result of their involvement in a number of political controversies and corruption scandals. The move led to a larger reshuffle on 26 September which saw Pedro Rollán being appointed to fill the Environment, Local Administration and Territory Planning portfolio and replaced in his own Transport, Housing and Infrastructures ministry by Rosalía Gonzalo; Enrique Ruiz Escudero becoming new Minister of Health and a restructuring of two cabinet posts: the Education, Youth and Sports ministry became the Ministry of Education and Research, maintained by Rafael van Grieken; and the Culture, Tourism and Sports portfolio, whose attributions had been subsumed into the President's office in 2015, was re-established as an independent ministry under Jaime Miguel de los Santos.
- On 25 April 2018, Cifuentes resigned as regional president following a string of scandals starting in March, involving the fraudulent obtention of a master's degree, the subsequent document forgery to cover it up and the leaking of a 2011 shoplifting video in which she was involved. As a result, Minister of the Presidency Ángel Garrido served as acting president until being confirmed to the post on 19 May 2018.

== Council of Government ==
The Council of Government was structured into the office for the president and seven ministries. From September 2017, the number of ministries was increased to eight.

← Cifuentes Government → (26 June 2015 – 22 May 2018)
Portfolio	Name	Party	Took office	Left office	Ref.
President	Cristina Cifuentes	PP	25 June 2015	25 April 2018	
President	Ángel Garrido served in acting capacity from 25 April to 19 May 2018.				
Minister of the Presidency, Justice and Spokesperson of the Government	Ángel Garrido	PP	26 June 2015	22 May 2018	
Minister of Economy, Employment and Finance	Engracia Hidalgo	PP	26 June 2015	22 May 2018	
Minister of the Environment, Local Administration and Territory Planning	Jaime González Taboada	PP	26 June 2015	25 September 2017	
Minister of Health	Jesús Sánchez Martos	PP (Ind.)	26 June 2015	25 September 2017	
Minister of Social Policies and Family	Carlos Izquierdo Torres	PP	26 June 2015	22 May 2018	
Minister of Education, Youth and Sports	Rafael van Grieken	PP (Ind.)	26 June 2015	26 September 2017	
Minister of Transport, Housing and Infrastructures	Pedro Rollán	PP	26 June 2015	26 September 2017	
=== Changes September 2017 ===
Portfolio	Name	Party	Took office	Left office	Ref.
Minister of the Environment, Local Administration and Territory Planning	Pedro Rollán	PP	26 September 2017	22 May 2018	
Minister of Health	Enrique Ruiz Escudero	PP	26 September 2017	22 May 2018	
Minister of Education and Research (Note: The Ministry of Education, Youth and Sports was rebranded as the Ministry of Education and Research on 26 September 2017.)	Rafael van Grieken	PP (Ind.)	26 September 2017	22 May 2018	
Minister of Transport, Housing and Infrastructures	Rosalía Gonzalo	PP	26 September 2017	22 May 2018	
Minister of Culture, Tourism and Sports (Note: On 26 September 2017, the Office of Culture, Tourism and Sports attached to the regional president's office was restructured into the Ministry of Education, Youth and Sports.)	Jaime Miguel de los Santos	PP (Ind.)	26 September 2017	22 May 2018	

== Notes ==
Preceded by González	Government of the Community of Madrid; 2015–2018	Succeeded by Garrido
