= Isabel Díaz Ayuso =

Spanish politician (born 1978)

The Most Excellent Isabel Díaz Ayuso
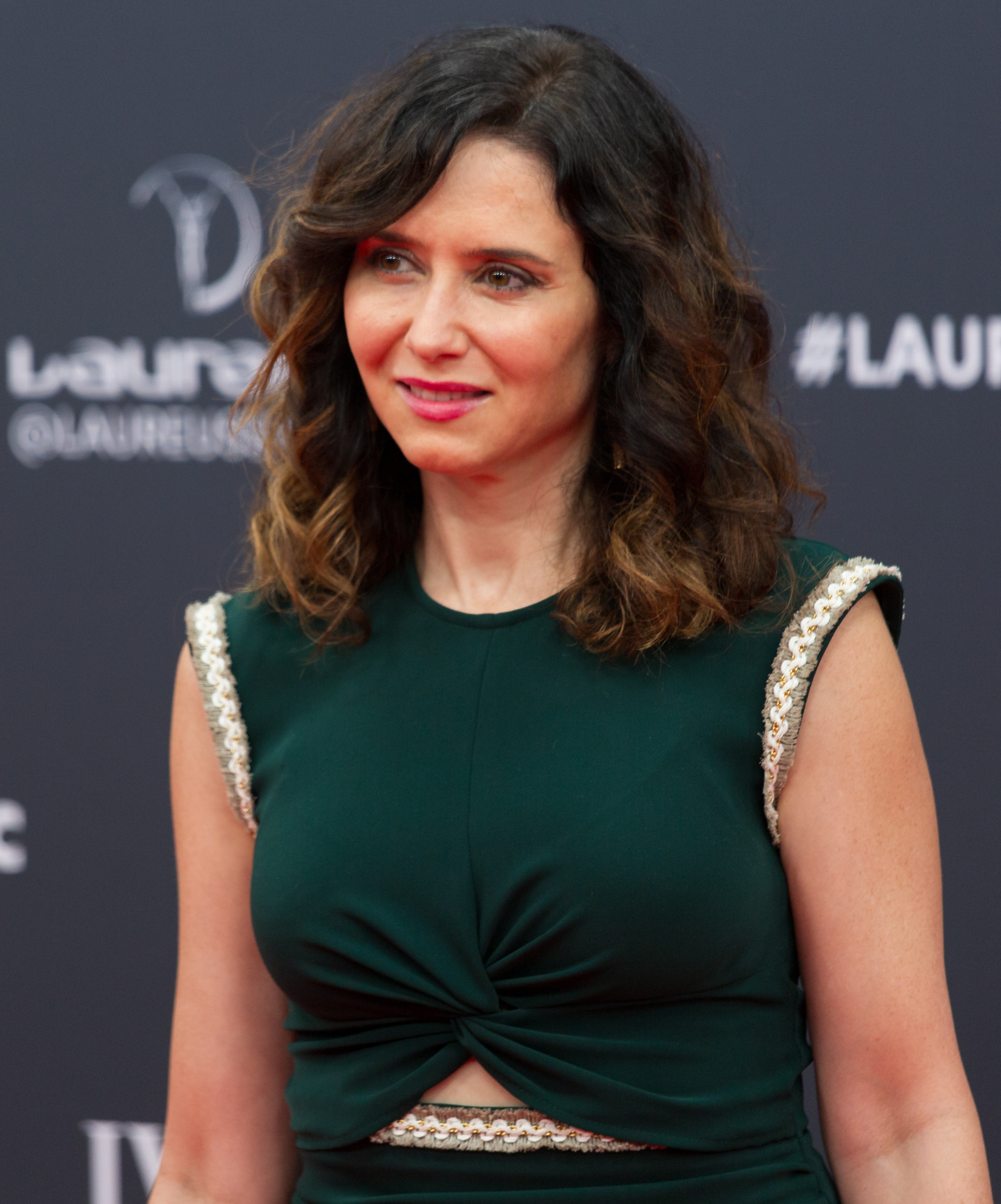
- Díaz Ayuso in 2024

President of the Community of Madrid
- Incumbent
- Assumed office 19 August 2019
- Vice President: Ignacio Aguado (2019−2021); Enrique Ossorio (2022–2023)
- Preceded by: Ángel Garrido (acting, Pedro Rollán Ojeda)

President of the People's Party of the Community of Madrid
- Incumbent
- Assumed office 21 May 2022
- Secretary-General: Alfonso Serrano
- Preceded by: Cristina Cifuentes (acting, Pío García-Escudero)

Deputy Councillor of the Presidency and Justice of the Community of Madrid
- In office 26 September 2017 – 22 May 2018
- President: Cristina Cifuentes
- Preceded by: Enrique Ruiz Escudero
- Succeeded by: José Enrique Núñez Guijarro

Member of the Assembly of Madrid
- Incumbent
- Assumed office 11 June 2019
- In office 15 July 2011 – 26 September 2017

Personal details
- Born: 17 October 1978 (age 48) Madrid, Spain
- Party: People's (since 2005)
- Spouse: Sergio Hernández (m. 2008; div. 2011)
- Domestic partner(s): Alberto González (2021–2026)
- Education: Complutense University of Madrid

Isabel Natividad Díaz Ayuso (Spanish: [isaˈβel ˈdi.aθ aˈʝuso]; born 17 October 1978) is a Spanish politician who has served as the president of the Community of Madrid since 2019. She is also the president of the People's Party of the Community of Madrid since 2022.

A member of the People's Party, and the vice-secretary of communication and spokeswoman of the party's Madrilenian branch, she was the regional candidate for president of the Community of Madrid ahead of the 2019 Madrilenian autonomous election. Although her party did not win the most seats in the autonomous elections for the first time since May 1991, she was later elected president by the Assembly of Madrid. Her administration represented several firsts: it was the first time that the region was run by a coalition government—formed by Ayuso's own conservative People's Party (PP) and Citizens—and it was the first time that Vox propped up an autonomous executive in Madrid. Under her leadership, the regional branch of the People's Party has obtained both its worst result (in 2019) and its best result ever (in 2021) in number of votes.

== Personal life ==
Born on 17 October 1978 in Madrid in the Chamberí district, her parents were involved in the trade of medical and orthopaedic goods. She has a degree in journalism from the Complutense University of Madrid (UCM) and a master's degree in Political Communication and Protocol.

Her partner between 2016 and 2020 was the hairdresser Jairo Alonso. From 2021 to 2026 she was in a relationship with Alberto González Amador.

Ayuso was baptized as a Catholic but became irreligious at age nine after her grandfather's death. During the COVID-19 pandemic, she returned to the Catholic faith, stressing the importance of seeing people pray for her well-being.

She is a co-owner of a property management business she inherited from her father.

== Political career ==
Diaz Ayuso in 2015

Affiliated to the Popular Party (PP) in 2005, when Pablo Casado was the president of New Generations in Madrid, in 2006, she was hired by Alfredo Prada, Minister of Justice and the Interior of the Government of the Community of Madrid, for his press department, gaining the confidence of Esperanza Aguirre. Specialized in political communication, she directed the online area of the PP, taking charge of Cristina Cifuentes' digital campaign in 2015.

A candidate on the PP list for the 2011 Madrid Assembly elections, she was not elected as a Member of Parliament at the time. She entered the ninth legislature of the regional parliament on 15 July, filling the vacancy caused by Engracia Hidalgo's resignation. She renewed her act as a deputy in the 2015 elections. During the X legislature she served as deputy spokesperson for her group, a position she abandoned along with her status as a deputy when she was appointed vice-counselor of the Presidency and Justice of the regional government.

On 11 January 2019, PP president Pablo Casado appointed her to lead the party in the 2019 Madrilenian regional election. In that election on 26 May, the PP list obtained 22.23% of valid votes and 30 seats, the second most voted list after the PSOE, with 27.31% of valid votes and 37 seats.

== Presidency of the Community of Madrid ==
=== First Madrid government ===
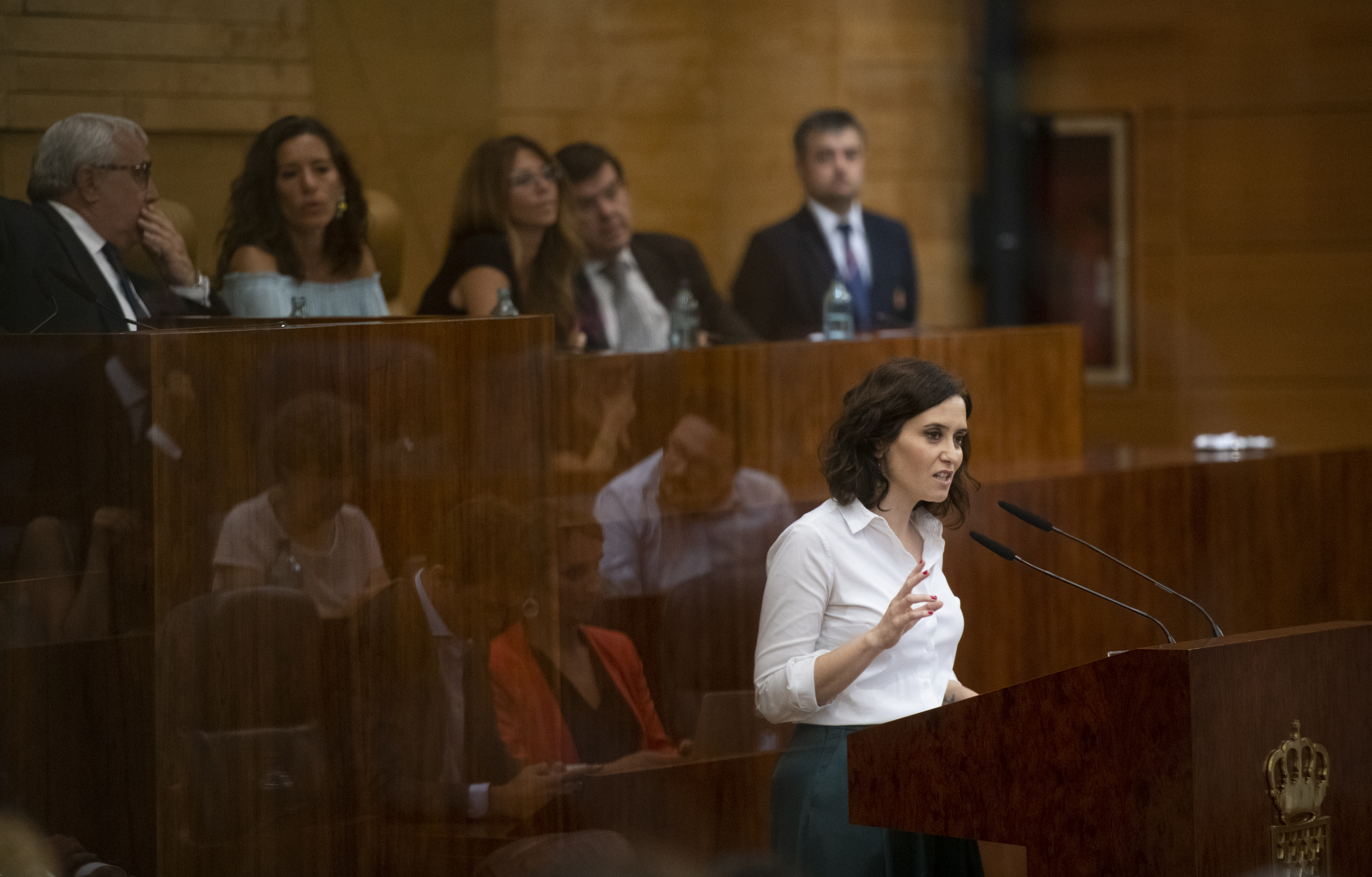
Díaz Ayuso at the Assembly of Madrid, during the investiture session

Proposed as a candidate for the Presidency of the Community of Madrid by the President of the Assembly of Madrid, Juan Trinidad, who had previously prevented an investiture session for Ángel Gabilondo by scheduling an investiture session without a candidate in July 2019, Díaz Ayuso was sworn in as President of the regional government on 14 August, with 68 votes in favour (corresponding to members of the Popular, Citizens' and Vox parliamentary groups in Madrid) and 64 against (corresponding to members of the Socialist, Más Madrid and United We Can-Madrid en Pie parliamentary groups).

In January 2020, she hired Miguel Ángel Rodríguez Bajón as chief of staff. Her vice president, Ignacio Aguado, then explained his disagreement with the decision.

On 1 December 2020, Díaz Ayuso inaugurated the Hospital Isabel Zendal, praised by her government but heavily criticised by the opposition for its cost overruns and its use as an "advertising campaign".

After Storm Filomena, the opposition criticised her government performance, accusing it of "lack of anticipation" against the incidences caused by the storm, that seriously damaged some infrastructure and parks in the region as well as trapping many citizens of the region for the night on the road, with snow accumulation of more than 50 centimeters in some points.

=== COVID-19 pandemic ===
Six months after Díaz Ayuso's inauguration as President of the Community of Madrid, the COVID-19 pandemic reached Spain with special virulence in the Community of Madrid. In accordance with the state of alarm decreed by the Spanish government on 14 March 2020, the government of the Community of Madrid, like the other autonomous communities, took immediate measures [required clarification] such as the closure of schools and leisure centres, shows and sports events, retired people's day centres, religious celebrations, the closure of hotels and tourist accommodation, shops considered not to be of basic need and the limitation of travel to those needed to go to work or buy food. It also adopted protection measures in public transport, and tax reductions in the payment of Business Tax (IAE) and Property Tax (IBI) for leisure, hotel and commercial premises, travel agencies and large stores, on the condition that they maintain the jobs until the end of the year. Presential activity was suspended in all Community Citizen Service offices, and remote work was encouraged.

In view of the saturation of hospital services, Díaz Ayuso's government used the ferial enclosure IFEMA as an emergency hospital, which emploed 5,500 hospital beds in order to attend to all patients. IFEMA hospital was built in a record time of less than 2 weeks, and the idea of the emergency hospital gave rise to the future Zendal Hospital, inaugurated a few months later. Hotels in Madrid were also used to look after less sick patients. Ayuso stopped appearing before the Madrid Assembly on 5 March 2020, and the chamber was closed for more than a month.

Díaz Ayuso was criticised for delivering high-quality FFP2 and FFP3 protective masks to the citizens of the Community of Madrid for free, which arguably could result in these kinds of masks becoming scarce in hospitals – it was later revealed that hospitals were also well-supplied with this equipment. In May 2020, during the coronavirus pandemic in Spain, her Director General of Public Health, Yolanda Fuentes, resigned, disagreeing with Díaz Ayuso's decision to request the transfer from phase 0 to phase 1 of the confinement, because it was not based on "health criteria", a position Ayuso reportedly took after a meeting with businessmen.

Díaz Ayuso opposed the request of her coalition partners, the Citizens party, for the army to intervene in retirement homes. However, the army did so, against her own criteria, finding corpses and people "in extreme situations and in poor sanitary conditions.

In October 2020, Alberto Reyero, the regional minister responsible for nursing homes, announced his resignation, wishing "good luck and success in the task that she has ahead" to Díaz Ayuso. He also mentioned that "the unity of the institutions is the most successful way to defeat the virus", criticizing the confrontation between the regional and national administrations. However, six days later, the central government approved the State of Alarm for the Community of Madrid following unsuccessful talks and confrontation between Díaz Ayuso and PM Pedro Sánchez. On 20 October 2020, two health officials of the Ayuso administration (the manager of Primary Attention and the manager of Hospitals) handed in their resignation.

=== 2021 snap election ===
On 10 March 2021, following an announcement by the Spanish Socialist Workers' Party (PSOE) and Citizens (Cs) to bring down the People's Party-led government in the Region of Murcia, Díaz Ayuso announced the breakup of her alliance with Cs in her own region and called a snap election in the Community of Madrid scheduled for 4 May. However, both the PSOE and Más Madrid preventively filed motions of no confidence in an attempt to thwart Díaz Ayuso's move.

She approved tax reform in April 2021 to lower the estate and gift tax.

Following her party's victory in the May elections, she was able to form a new government of the People's Party of the Community of Madrid with the external support of Vox, after her former colleagues of Citizens failed to gain a single seat.

=== Second Madrid government ===
On 31 August 2021, she announced her intention to contest the leadership of the regional branch of the party, a position left vacant since the resignation of former President Cristina Cifuentes.

In February 2022, Spanish media revealed Diaz Ayuso's People's Party made repeated attempts to illegally spy on her in the hope of obtaining sensitive information and blackmailing her out of the race to seize control of the Madrid branch of the party. The party's federal leadership closed in on then-unreleased allegations Ayuso's brother was involved in €1.5 M worth of healthcare material purchased by her administration at the height of the COVID-19 pandemic in April 2020 in Spain. When disclosed, she reacted by insisting her brother's business deals were performed according to law and received no special treatment, whilst publicly accusing her party's top officials of conspiring against her. The scandal was sealed with the resignation of both PP President Pablo Casado and Deputy President García Egea, Ayuso herself managing to survive relatively unscathed and emboldened in her bid for the party's leadership in Madrid.

Between 200,000 and 670,000 demonstrators gather on 13 November 2022 in Madrid to defend the public health system in the region and against a proposed reform of the sector. The demonstration is aimed at the health policies of Isabel Diaz Ayuso, who wants to develop public-private partnerships and restructure the community care system. According to the unions, these services have been under pressure for several years, due to a lack of resources and personnel, and to poor regional management.

=== Third Madrid government ===
Following the 2023 Madrilenian regional election, the People's Party obtained its first absolute majority under her leadership, which allowed her to govern without the need of the far-right Vox for the first time.

== Political positions ==
Díaz Ayuso is neoliberal on economic issues. She has been described as a populist by several international newspapers, including Politico, The Guardian, and The Times.

Having broken in as leader of the PP candidacy with a harsh speech close in style to that of José María Aznar, Esperanza Aguirre and Pablo Casado, Díaz Ayuso declared herself to be "next to Vox, not in front of it". In May 2021, she stated that "when they call you a fascist you know you’re doing something right." In April 2021, she stated that she and PP "agreed on fundamental issues" with the far-right party Vox and "that will continue to be the case."

In 2023, she called for the Basque nationalist party EH Bildu to be banned, claiming that "ETA is still alive" in the party. She has claimed that former Podemos secretary general Pablo Iglesias Turrión was "born from evil, to do evil."

Some of her positions and comments strained relations with her 2019-2021 government partners, Ciudadanos, which led to an early election. She has been compared to current American president Donald Trump by several of her critics.

=== Social issues ===
In the same month of April, when she was already the candidate for the presidency of the Community of Madrid, she proposed that children conceived but not born yet be counted as members of family units for the purpose of applying for social aid or school places. She did not clarify whether these aids would be maintained in the event that the baby was not born. In February 2020, she stated that the LGBT law of the Community of Madrid approved by her predecessor in office – who also belonged to the People's Party and of which she herself voted in favour – was a consequence of "tyrannical progressivism" and that, if it were up to her, "some articles would have to be repealed".

During a heated debate with Rocío Monasterio, the president of Vox Madrid, Díaz Ayuso stated that she does not want to repeal the LGBT law or any other social laws. Instead, she believed that these laws can be "improved upon". In December 2023, Díaz Ayuso's government approved reforms to the regional LGBT laws that eliminated penalties for discrimination based on sexual orientation and gender identity, becoming the first jurisdiction in Europe to do so.

=== Colonialism ===
She joined a chorus of politicians, including Spain's Socialist Prime Minister Pedro Sánchez, that repudiated the demand for an apology for colonialism by the President of Mexico, Andrés Manuel López Obrador. Ayuso accused the Mexican President of instigating an "indigenism that is the new communism", and later said that indigenous movements across Latin America were promoting "a simplistic revision of Spanish history", the wrecking of "Spain's legacy in the Americas…[such as] the mixing and fusion of cultures that have forged such strong Atlantic links", and that Spain "took Spanish and... Catholicism, and therefore civilisation and freedom, to the American continent". She further disagreed with Pope Francis's statement that the Catholic Church should ask forgiveness for its actions in Mexico.

In May 2026. Ayuso participated in an event titled "Celebration of Evangelization and Mestizaje in Mexico: Malinche and Cortés" in Mexico City (at Frontón México, after a planned cathedral venue was reportedly changed). She defended the Spanish Conquest as a positive process of "hope, joy, alliances" and five centuries of mestizaje, paying tribute to figures like Hernán Cortés and Queen Isabella. This drew strong backlash in both Spain and Mexico. Ayuso had previously called Mexico a "narco-state" and President Claudia Sheinbaum responded by criticizing Ayuso's views on the Conquest, calling such vindications of Cortés "destined for defeat".

The Mexican newspaper El Pais noted that Díaz Ayuso spells the country as "Méjico"; The spelling with "j" was introduced by Spain's Real Academia Española in a spelling reform around 1815, concurrent with the Mexican war of independence from Spain, and the "j" spelling was suggested by RAE until the early 21st century. However, in Mexico itself the spelling with "x" has been used universally since its independence, with Mexicans "resist[ing] the change of the spelling of their country's name." The spelling "México" is now recommended by the RAE, as elsewhere in the Spanish-speaking world.

=== Climate ===
Regarding climate change, she says it "has always existed" and dismissed "apocalyptic claims" as part of a "communist plot". In April 2019, she claimed night traffic jams were a "hallmark" of the city of Madrid, lamenting their disappearance with the start-up of the low-emission zone Madrid Central. Later, in an interview with El País, she clarified that "... I love the nightlife here, I have lived it with intensity. I hate traffic jams: I hate them. I just miss that nightlife and everyone has understood what I meant".

== Controversies ==
=== Public procurements to relatives ===
In April 2020 during the COVID-19 pandemic in Spain, the Community of Madrid used an emergency procedure — bypassing a public tender process — to award more than 1.5 million euros to the company Priviet Sportive, S.L., for the importation of 250,000 face masks. The company operated within the textile sector, with no connection to the healthcare field, and was owned by Daniel Alcázar, a childhood friend of the Díaz Ayuso family. In that transaction, the brother of Díaz Ayuso, Tomás, received a payment of 55,850 euros for handling the arrangements to procure the supplies in China and transport them to Madrid. The company paid a total of 563,542 euros for the masks and sold them to the regional government for nearly triple that amount—1,512,500 euros, described by some media as one of the pandemic's most expensive adjudications.

In February 2022, it emerged that another company where Tomás Díaz Ayuso also worked, Artesolar Iluminación, S.A., had signed 18 contracts with the Community of Madrid. Ten of these were entered into after his sister assumed the presidency, amounting to a cost of 70,000 euros for the Community. All of the contracts were minor, and therefore did not require a public tender process, to which the company issued a statement clarifying that Tomás Díaz Ayuso was not a member of its staff and had merely acted as an external consultant for certain projects, while denying that any external sales agent had played a role in securing the contracts.

=== Appointment as distinguised alumna by the Complutense University of Madrid ===
In January 2023 she was named a distinguished alumna of the Complutense University of Madrid at the proposal of its rector, Joaquín Goyache—a decision that triggered a crisis within the university itself and led to the resignation of several high-ranking officials. A segment of the academic community expressed its opposition to granting this recognition to Ayuso, while also raising concerns regarding the motivations behind it. Of the eight individuals honored that day, Ayuso was the only one who did not receive the endorsement of the Faculty Board of the Faculty of Information Sciences. At the awards ceremony—which saw a significant police presence to prevent any incidents—the student with the top academic record in Audiovisual Communication from the previous year spoke out against the appointment of the regional president. The issue resurfaced following the regionwide strikes in the education community against the regional government for its alleged underfunding.

=== Judicial investigation into her romantic partner ===
Alberto González Amador, partner of Díaz Ayuso since 2021, has been accused of defrauding the tax authorities of 350,951 euros between 2020 and 2021 through a scheme involving false invoices and shell companies, according to a complaint filed by the Madrid Provincial Prosecutor's Office. The investigation focuses on two alleged counts of tax fraud and one count of document forgery attributed to González Amador, who reportedly used these tactics to lower his corporate tax liability during the pandemic. Companies owned by him—Maxwell Cremona Ingeniería y Procesos para el Fomento del Medioambiente and Masterman & Whitaker Medical Supplies and Health Process Engineering—allegedly submitted 15 false invoices for 3.7 million euros in fictitious expenses, thereby claiming tax deductions for income that was never generated and evading approximately 350,000 euros in taxes over two consecutive years. Ultimately, he was summoned to testify as a person under investigation for two tax offenses and one count of document forgery.

On October 23, 2024, it was revealed that his partner had attempted to claim a tax deduction for—among other personal expenses—the rental of two vehicles while they were both on vacation in 2021, while the Community of Madrid had reserved the VIP lounge at Barajas Airport for those two trips.

=== Healthcare ===
==== COVID-19 pandemic and deaths in elderly care homes ====
In March 2020, her government approved a document that established "exclusion criteria" denying hospital transfers for ill elderly individuals living in care homes within the Community of Madrid. The opposition labeled these "the protocols of shame", and they were also denounced by the regional Minister for Social Policy, Alberto Reyero (of the Citizens political party) who resigned from his position because of this document. The number of people who died during the worst months of the pandemic—March and April 2020—without receiving hospital care has been estimated at 7,291. This figure includes both individuals who died in care homes due to COVID-19 or symptoms consistent with the disease, as well as others who died from different causes.

In November 2020, the High Court of Justice of Madrid upheld the legality of the protocols approved by the Madrid Regional Ministry of Health, concluding that they contained "general and secondary objectives that cannot be deemed unreasonable, given the pandemic that the country was beginning to experience—at a time when there was a complete lack of understanding regarding its scale and how to address it—and which, from the very outset, raised red flags about the potential for the healthcare and social care system to be overwhelmed."

In 2024, the Ayuso administration sought to block—through the courts—the release of police reports concerning nursing homes during the pandemic, citing the need to protect the personal data contained within them, as well as the significant volume of documentation that would be involved in their preparation. The regional government also noted that these reports had always been available to members of the regional assembly. It further announced that citizens who requested access via the Transparency Portal would be able to consult the documents in person at the offices of the Department of the Interior—by appointment and specifying which nursing home’s reports they wished to review. However, it proved controversial that Ayuso, when speaking to the media, justified the failure to transfer elderly residents to hospitals by stating that "they were going to die anyway."

==== Low investment, privatization and waiting lists ====
The opposition has frequently criticized the fact that the Community of Madrid, under the presidency of Díaz Ayuso, allocates the lowest per capita budget for public healthcare in Spain. According to data from December 2024, per capita healthcare investment in Madrid for 2025 was projected at 1,482 euros—well below the national average of 1,944 euros. This trend has remained consistent in recent years, with Madrid ranking last in terms of initially budgeted per capita healthcare investment since 2021—a year in which only Andalusia ranked lower.

Since the COVID-19 pandemic, the number of pending medical appointments within the public healthcare system of the Community of Madrid has continued to rise, reaching a new record of over one million (1,029,742) in August 2024, according to official data from the regional Department of Health. This figure surpasses the previous peak recorded in May of the same year and reflects a sustained increase since February 2020, when there were 683,878 pending appointments. The total number of pending medical appointments in Madrid is calculated by combining three categories: 743,777 people awaiting outpatient consultations, 188,912 awaiting diagnostic tests, and 97,053 awaiting surgical procedures. Despite the time that has passed since the pandemic, the Community of Madrid has failed to reverse this upward trend—a fact that highlights the persistent strain on the healthcare system and raises questions regarding the effectiveness of the regional government’s management in this area. The Community of Madrid attributes the high number of pending appointments to an increase in healthcare activity and population growth, with the region’s population now approaching seven million. Furthermore, regional officials maintain that the most critical metric is not the total number of pending appointments, but rather the length of wait times, noting that Madrid has one of the shortest average wait times for surgery. While the national average is 128 days, the average wait time in Madrid as of August 2024 stands at 65.2 days. Critics, however, point out that before reaching the surgical waiting list, patients must first see a specialist—a stage where Madrid faces one of the most significant bottlenecks in Spain, which substantially delays the actual start of the care process. Más Madrid has frequently accused the regional government of having no genuine intention to reduce waiting lists, as this situation provides a financial benefit to publicly owned but privately managed hospitals—most notably the Quirón Hospital Group. These facilities generate revenue for every patient referred to them from overburdened public hospitals, effectively turning the collapse of the system into a highly lucrative business for these private entities. Since 2015, the public healthcare system in the Madrid region has lost nearly 1,000 hospital beds—a reduction that, in terms of capacity, is equivalent to the complete disappearance of La Paz University Hospital, one of the largest in the region.

===== Torrejón hospital =====
On December 3, 2025, the newspaper El País released audio recordings from a meeting in which Pablo Gallart, executive director of Ribera Salud—the private entity managing the Torrejón hospital—instructed his managers to deliberately lengthen waiting lists and reject patients or less profitable medical procedures in order to maximize the company’s profits. This sparked controversy over the alleged violation of patient rights at a public hospital whose management had been privatized. Furthermore, it emerged that four executives had previously filed internal complaints via the company’s ethics channel, flagging directives to prioritize "profitable" procedures, increase waiting lists, and reuse single-use medical supplies, practices that violate health regulations and could jeopardize patient safety. Following this, the four executives who had reported such "malpractice in patient care" were dismissed.

Following the controversy, the CEO of Ribera Salud requested to be "disassociated" from responsibilities regarding the hospital. Ribera Salud stated that the dismissals were due to a "loss of confidence" and not retaliation, asserting that an internal audit had uncovered no evidence of serious regulatory, criminal, or administrative misconduct; consequently, the company closed the complaints filed by the executives.

=== Tax policy and accusations of fiscal dumping ===
Díaz Ayuso has been frequently criticized for requesting more resources for the Community of Madrid while implementing policies to reduce or eliminate taxes—measures that, according to critics, would lower regional government revenue. In 2021, the only two taxes specific to the Community of Madrid were abolished.

Its tax management has occasionally been criticized as "fiscal dumping"—the argument being that the practice of significantly lowering taxes to attract taxpayers from other regions can create unfair competition and undermine the funding of public services in other autonomous communities. In November 2021, the President of the Basque Government, Iñigo Urkullu, described the policy of the Community of Madrid’s government as fiscal dumping. He questioned whether a region could pursue a tax policy like Madrid’s "and then demand compensation from the Spanish government for lower tax revenue". To this, Ayuso replied: "They look at us with envy and criticize us out of resentment." In October 2023, Ayuso dismissed the criticisms made by Spanish Prime Minister Pedro Sánchez regarding "tax dumping" in Madrid as "provincial" (or "uncouth"), and defended the fiscal autonomy of the Community of Madrid. In December 2024, Ayuso criticized the proposal for a unique financing arrangement for Catalonia, labeling it "unfair", while arguing that fiscal measures should not be uniform across all regions.

=== Israel support ===
Before holding high-level positions, Ayuso traveled to Israel in the autumn of 2018, visiting Jerusalem, the Golan Heights and Israeli settlements in the West Bank—which are considered illegal by most of the international community. She also posed for a photograph with a tank and declared, "I consider myself pro-Israel". Ayuso reportedly met with David Elhayani, a leader of settlers in the Jordan Valley and president of the Yesha organization—a group that encompasses Israeli settlers in the occupied territories, supports the expansion of Israeli settlements and maintains close ties to Prime Minister Benjamin Netanyahu.

Isabel Díaz Ayuso has consistently expressed support for Israel in her statements, especially since the start of its offensive against Gaza in October 2023. In response to accusations from the opposition of "complicity" in thegenocide in Gaza, she stated in the Madrid Assembly: "Genocide is the systematic extermination or elimination of a human group based on race, ethnicity, religion, political affiliation, or nationality. And the only ones here who have spoken of genocide are you and your leader [in a mention to Sumar leader Yolanda Díaz]—back when she called for the extermination of Israel 'from the river to the sea'. Mind you, she then threw on a shawl—a little cardigan—and went off to take selfies at the Vatican [...] And what are the Palestinian authorities doing to protect their own people? No water, no education—just tunnels used to systematically bombard Israel [...] Yet, when other genocides occur—like those in Africa, for instance—in Nigeria alone, there have been 10,000 murders between 2022 and 2024—you remain completely silent, while still finding time for selfies at the Vatican, of course [...] Or consider the many delegations that cannot participate in the Olympic Games because they are women. In many countries, women are denied the chance to compete in the Olympics. Have you said anything about that? Have you ever tried to boycott such events? Of course not—because your problem is the same as it has always been: antisemitism."

Díaz Ayuso expressed support for the Israel-Premier Tech cycling team at the 2025 Vuelta a España—at a time when their participation in the event was a source of controversy—and refused to label Israel’s war in Gaza as a genocide, unlike other regional leaders from the People's Party who did so.

Following the cancellation of the final stage of the 2025 Vuelta a España prompted by protests from pro-Palestinian demonstrators objecting to the participation of the Israel-Premier Tech team, Ayuso described the protests as reminiscent of "Sarajevo at war". Prior to this, she had visited and greeted the Israeli team, Israel-Premier Tech; following the incident, she announced that she would award the Gold Medal of the Community of Madrid to the Vuelta a España, and the International Medal to its winner, Jonas Vingegaard.

In September 2025, several educational institutions in the Community of Madrid received verbal instructions from the Department of Education to remove symbols of support for Palestine—such as flags or related activities—and, although Isabel Díaz Ayuso has denied issuing a formal order to that effect, she has publicly endorsed the ban, stating: "I ask that they stop indoctrinating in the classrooms". However, Ayuso herself had previously promoted campaigns of solidarity with Ukraine in schools following the Russian invasion.

=== Use of properties belonging to the Community of Madrid ===
==== Use of luxury penthouse as office ====
On July 29, 2026, it emerged that the public company Planifica Madrid—which operates under the auspices of the Community of Madrid—had acquired a 485-square-meter luxury penthouse, featuring a terrace of approximately 200 square meters in the Chamberí district, the same area where the regional president lived. The purchase was justified on the grounds that it would serve as a temporary meeting space for Díaz Ayuso while the headquarters of the regional presidency, located in the Real Casa de Correos at Puerta del Sol, underwent renovation. Later, officials from the Madrid regional government indicated that the space would also be used for meetings of the Governing Council and for other institutional purposes.

Neither the purchase of the penthouse nor the price paid for it was publicly disclosed on the Community of Madrid’s transparency portal. Various media outlets reported that it cost 6.3 million euros, while the seller paid a 3% commission—amounting to €189,000—to the luxury real estate agency that handled the transaction. Opposition parties questioned the decision to purchase a property with such characteristics and at such a price using the tax money of Madrid residents rather than renting temporary office space or utilizing one of the many buildings already owned by the Community of Madrid, pointing out among other things that a 200-square-meter outdoor terrace is not necessary "for holding meetings". Furthermore, it was noted that this news coincided with the listing on Idealista.com of the apartment and penthouse where Ayuso lives with her partner, Alberto González Amador, for 3.42 million euros and the fact that there was no public works tender for the Real Casa de Correos listed on the portal where the Community of Madrid’s public contracts are published was pointed out by some critics to argue that the penthouse had been purchased as a residence for the president.

Following the controversy, the Community of Madrid announced that it would put the penthouse—along with four other properties—up for sale, and that the proceeds would be used for the reconstruction of the Sierra Oeste region of Madrid, which was severely affected by the 2026 forest fires in Spain. However, no offers were received to purchase the penthouse.

=== Birthday travels abroad ===
Opposition groups in the Madrid Assembly have pointed out that some of Ayuso’s official trips have coincided with her birthday, alleging that these journeys may be more personal or recreational in nature than institutional and that this has become a recurring practice. Specifically, they highlighted trips to Austin (United States) in 2025, Brussels (Belgium) in 2024, and New York (United States) in 2023. The official account maintains that the trips are entirely institutional. According to her team, the primary objective is "to attract investment, businesses, and events to the Community of Madrid, thereby strengthening its image as a competitive and attractive destination on the international stage". Socialist spokesperson Mar Espinar called for the travel expenses to be made public, questioning whether "the people of Madrid are paying for Ayuso’s whims" and noting that this is "the second time she has celebrated her birthday in the U.S." Más Madrid has filed a formal proposal in the Madrid Assembly requesting the detailed publication of the objectives, costs, and participants for all official trips taken by senior officials of the regional government.

=== International Medal of the Community of Madrid ===
Díaz Ayuso has been criticized for awarding the International Medal of the Community of Madrid to controversial figures, and for co-opting this institutional symbol to bolster her own political narrative.

==== Javier Milei ====
On June 21, 2024, Díaz Ayuso presented the International Medal of the Community of Madrid to Javier Milei, President of Argentina, during a ceremony at the Real Casa de Correos in Madrid. The official justification for the award was that it recognized the "historical, cultural, linguistic, and economic ties" between Argentina and the Madrid region, and served as a gesture of institutional courtesy toward a foreign head of state". Furthermore, Ayuso framed the presentation by praising Milei’s defense of "freedom", highlighting his "firmness and courage" in the face of what she termed "totalitarian projects" and she championed measures that, in her view, "promote economic freedom and liberal reforms".

==== United States ====
On February 11, 2026, during "The Hispanic Prosperity Gala" held at Mar-a-Lago—the official residence of U.S. President Donald Trump—Isabel Díaz Ayuso announced that she would award the International Medal of the Community of Madrid to the United States. She described the U.S. as "the primary beacon of the free world", a nation that "Madrid has always looked upon with admiration", and praised "every step they take forward in defense of hispanidad" This move drew criticism even from right-leaning media outlets. Vicente Vallés, a presenter for Antena 3 Noticias, characterized it as "another step in the Madrid regional president’s progressive shift toward attitudes aligned with Trumpism", noting: "You have just heard Isabel Díaz Ayuso refer to the United States as 'the beacon of the free world' at a time when Donald Trump is actively seeking to dismantle the global order by distancing himself from democratic European allies and drawing closer to autocrats. [...] She also spoke of the steps the United States is taking in defense of hispanidad even as Trump has launched a campaign targeting Hispanic immigrants. For months, the paramilitary-style force known as ICE has been detaining—often with excessive violence—immigrants who have arrived in the U.S. from Latin American countries. People have been killed by their gunfire, and children have even been taken into custody as a means to force the capture of their parents". Following the backlash, Ayuso defended the award, stating that "it is not being given to a government, but to a nation, in recognition of its 250 years of independence".

=== Clashes with Pedro Sánchez and "me gusta la fruta" ===
The relationship between Díaz Ayuso and Pedro Sánchez, prime minister of Spain, is described as one of "confrontation", with Ayuso often openly insulting and attacking Sánchez and Sánchez using the controversies surrounding her to attack her figure and policies. Díaz Ayuso has often called him a "dictator" and a "tyrant", an "abuser" and a "mafia boss". Sánchez has frequently criticized her fiscal policies and the state of the healthcare system in the region, as well as using the controversies and scandals surrounding her figure and that of her romantic partner to attack her. One of the most famous incidents occurred in the Congress of Deputies, where after Sánchez brought up the economic scandal of González Amador during his investiture debate, Isabel Díaz Ayuso—who was present at the time— allegedly called him "hijo de puta" ("son of a bitch"). Later, she justified herself by stating that was she said was "me gusta la fruta" ("I love fruit"). This prompted members and supporters of the People's Party—most notably national and regional deputy Noelia Núñez—to wear T-shirts and other items bearing the slogan. "Me gusta la fruta" has therefore a common euphemism used by the regional president and her associates to insult the prime minister.

== Honours ==
In September 2021 Díaz Ayuso was awarded the Bruno Leoni Prize in recognition of the policies implemented by the Community of Madrid to address the COVID-19 epidemic, avoiding indiscriminate lockdowns and aiming to preserve individual freedoms and economic activities. The prize is awarded by Istituto Bruno Leoni, an Italian classical-liberal think tank. This was the first instance of a government personality being selected while in office. Previously, the prize had been awarded to personalities such as Nobel laureates Vernon L. Smith and Mario Vargas Llosa, academics (Richard Pipes and Deirdre McCloskey), and democracy activists (Leopoldo López and Canan Arın).

== Electoral history ==
Electoral history of Isabel Díaz Ayuso
Election	List	Constituency	List position	Result
Madrilenian regional election, May 2011	People's Party	Madrid	74th (out of 129)	Not elected (entered later in the regional Parliament)
Madrilenian regional election, May 2015	People's Party	Madrid	23rd (out of 129)	Elected
Madrilenian regional election, May 2019	People's Party	Madrid	1st (out of 132)	Elected
Madrilenian regional election, May 2021	People's Party	Madrid	1st (out of 136)	Elected
Madrilenian regional election, May 2023	People's Party	Madrid	1st (out of 136)	Elected

Political offices
Preceded by Enrique Ruiz Escudero	Deputy Councillor of the Presidency and Justice of the Community of Madrid; 2012–2015	Succeeded by José Enrique Núñez Guijarro
Preceded by Ángel Garrido (acting, Pedro Rollán Ojeda)	President of the Community of Madrid; 2019–present	Incumbent
Party political offices
Preceded by Enrique Ossorio	Leader of the Popular Group in the Assembly of Madrid; 2019	Succeeded by Alfonso Serrano Sánchez-Capuchino
Preceded by Cristina Cifuentes (acting, Pío García-Escudero)	President of the People's Party of the Community of Madrid; 2022–present	Incumbent
