= Ángel Garrido =

Spanish politician (born 1964)

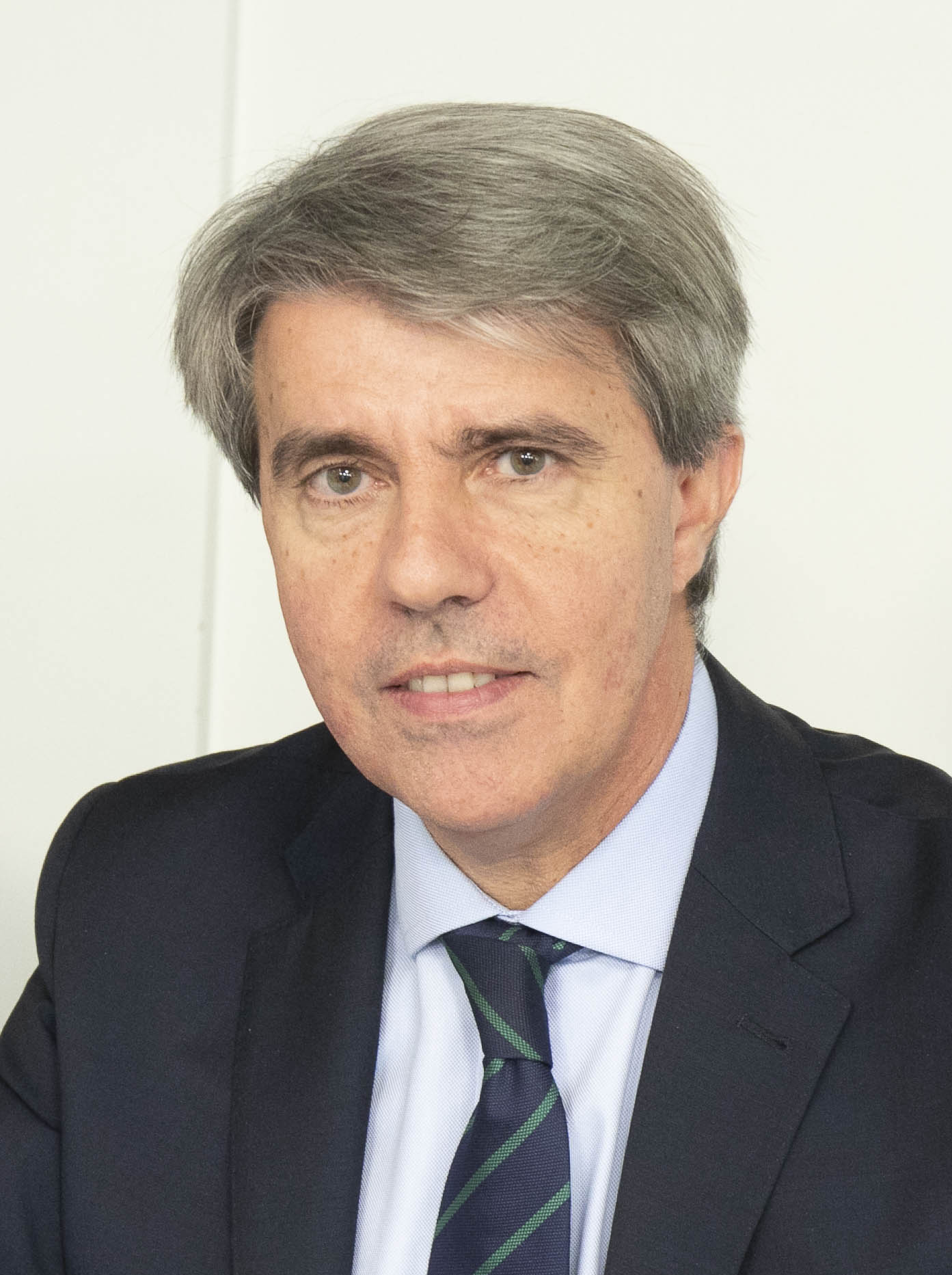
- Garrido in October 2018

Councillor of Transport, Mobility and Infrastructure of the Community of Madrid
- In office 20 August 2019 – 11 March 2021
- Monarch: Felipe VI
- President: Isabel Díaz Ayuso
- Preceded by: Rosalía Gonzalo (Transport, Housing and Infrastructure)
- Succeeded by: David Pérez García

President of the Community of Madrid
- In office 19 May 2018 – 11 April 2019; Acting: 25 April – 19 May 2018
- Monarch: Felipe VI
- Preceded by: Cristina Cifuentes
- Succeeded by: Pedro Rollán (acting)

Councillor of the Presidency and Justice of the Community of Madrid
- In office 27 June 2015 – 19 May 2018
- Monarch: Felipe VI
- President: Cristina Cifuentes
- Preceded by: Salvador Victoria
- Succeeded by: Pedro Rollán (Presidency); Yolanda Ibarrola (Justice)

Member of the Assembly of Madrid
- In office 10 June 2019 – 10 March 2021
- In office 9 June 2015 – 2 April 2019

Personal details
- Born: 7 April 1964 (age 62) Madrid, Spain
- Party: PP (1991–2019); Cs (2019–2021)
- Education: Universidad Politécnica de Madrid
- Occupation: Politician

Ángel Garrido García (born 7 April 1964) is a Spanish politician who served as President of the Community of Madrid between April 2018 and April 2019. He was a member of the People's Party until 24 April 2019, only four days ahead of the 2019 Spanish general election, when he announced he was joining Citizens.

== Biography ==
=== Early life ===
Born on 7 April 1964 in Madrid, his father was from Ávila while his mother came from Jaén. He took his basic education at the Tajamar School, a centre for males linked to the Opus Dei located in the current district of Puente de Vallecas. He took his college education at the Technical University of Madrid's School of Mining Engineering, where he graduated as mining engineer. He worked in the private sector in the area of logistics.

=== Municipal politics ===
Briefly affiliated to the Democratic and Social Centre (CDS), he joined the People's Party (PP) in 1991; he also joined the New Generations youth wing. Endorsed within the party ranks by Feliciano Blázquez, he ran third in the party list for the 1995 municipal election in Pinto and was elected councillor for the 1995–1999 period, his first public office. He became the PP's spokesperson in the plenary of the city council.

He was included in the PP list for the 1999 Madrid municipal election headed by José María Álvarez del Manzano. Elected as municipal councillor, he began his 16-year spell in the city council of the Spanish capital. He was subsequently re-elected in the 2003, 2007 and 2011 elections. Throughout this period, he presided over the districts of Villa de Vallecas, Latina, Chamberí, Usera and Retiro. From 2004 to 2008, Garrido was also a member of the Executive Secretariat of Regional Policy of the People's Party of the Community of Madrid, where he befriended Cristina Cifuentes and Jaime González Taboada.

=== Member of the regional government ===
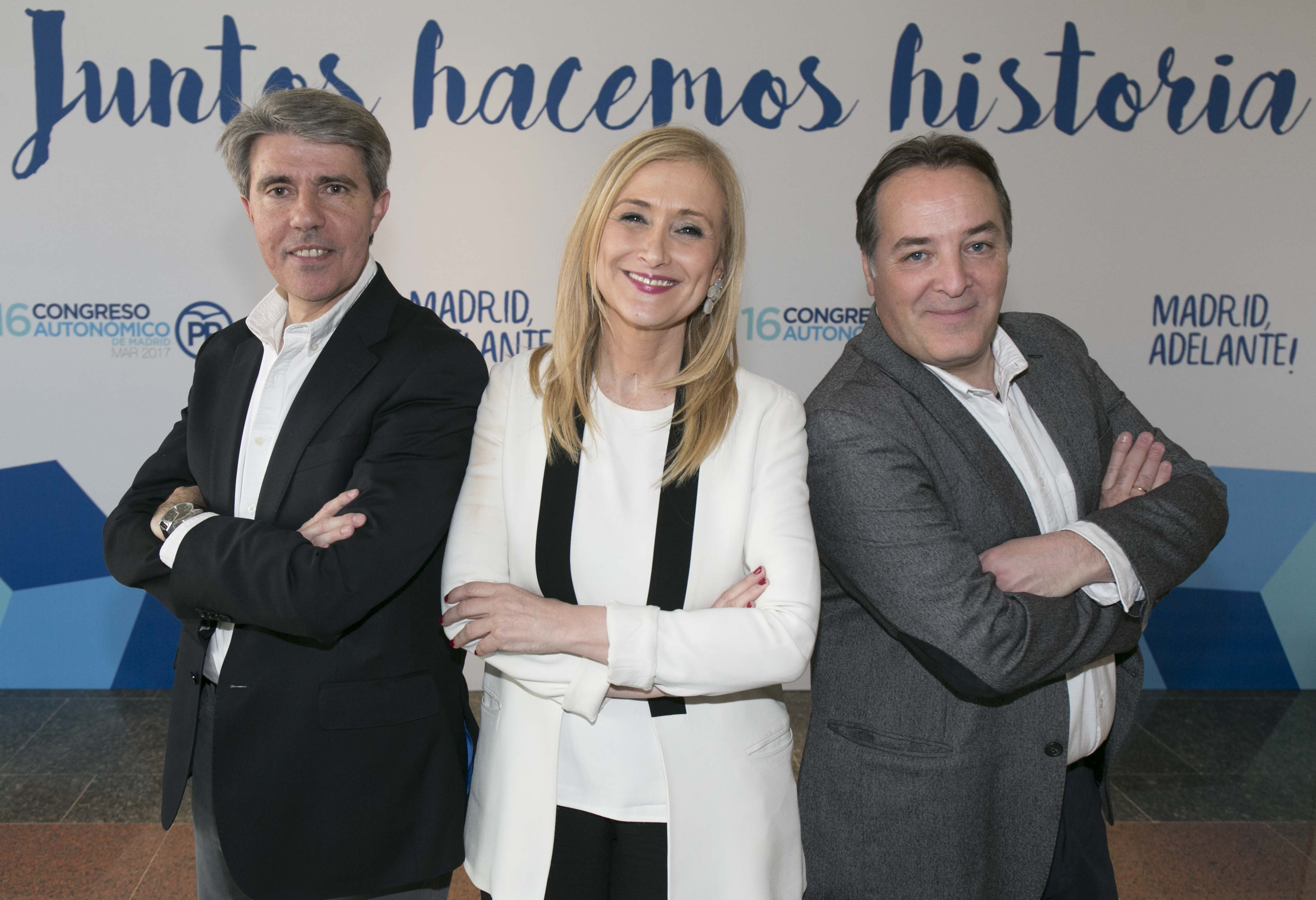
Garrido and Jaime González Taboada siding next to Cristina Cifuentes during the 2017 PP Regional Congress

After the 2015 election to the Assembly of Madrid in which he ran second in the candidature of the People's Party after Cristina Cifuentes, he was assigned to negotiate the investiture of the later as regional president with Citizens.

After the resignation of Esperanza Aguirre as leader of the regional branch of the PP in February 2016, he was appointed President of the Electoral Committee.

After the celebration of the regional Congress of March 2017, he was elected at the Comité Ejecutivo Autonómico of People's Party of the Community of Madrid, presided by Cristina Cifuentes as Secretrary.

=== Presidency of the Community of Madrid ===
On 25 April 2018 Cifuentes resigned as President of the Community of Madrid, after the release of a 2011 video that shows her being detained in a supermarket for shoplifting, and in the wake of strong evidence that her master's degree was fraudulently obtained. Ángel Garrido became then acting president of the regional government. Following his investiture by the regional parliament on 17–18 May, he was sworn into office on 21 May 2018. Once Isabel Díaz Ayuso was designated as the leader of the PP list in the upcoming 2019 Madrilenian regional election and Garrido was selected as candidate within the PP list for the 2019 European Parliament election, the latter handed in his resignation as regional president on 11 April 2019.

== Electoral history ==
Electoral history of Ángel Garrido
Election	List	Constituency	List position	Result
Pinto local election, 1995	PP	–	3rd (out of 21)	Elected
Madrid local election, 1999	PP	–	28th (out of 53)	Elected
Madrid local election, 2003	PP	–	29th (out of 55)	Elected
Madrid local election, 2007	PP	–	16th (out of 57)	Elected
Madrid local election, 2011	PP	–	16th (out of 57)	Elected
Spanish general election, 2011	PP	Madrid	36th (out of 36)	Unelected
Madrid regional election, 2015	PP	–	2nd (out of 129)	Elected

Political offices
Preceded by Salvador Victoria	Councillor of the Presidency and Justice of the Community of Madrid; 2015–2018	Succeeded by Pedro Rollán Ojeda; Yolanda Ibarrola
Preceded by Cristina Cifuentes	President of the Community of Madrid; 2018–2019	Succeeded by Isabel Díaz Ayuso (acting, Pedro Rollán Ojeda)
Preceded by Rosalía Gonzalo López	Councillor of Transportation, Mobility and Infrastructure of the Community of Madrid; 2019–2021	Succeeded by David Pérez García
Party political offices
Preceded by Juan Carlos Vera	Secretary-general of the People's Party of the Community of Madrid; 2017–2018	Succeeded by Juan Carlos Vera
