= María Pachón Monge =

Spanish military officer

- Born: 1981 (age 44–45); La Zarza-Perrunal, Huelva, Spain

María Pachón Monge (born 1981) is a military officer in the Spanish Air and Space Force, known for being the first publicly recognized trans woman in the Spanish Armed Forces.

== Life and career ==
Pachón began her transition in 2002, alongside the initial clinical and psychological evaluations that were required at the time in Spain to officially change one's gender. In 2006, she joined the military after undergoing a gender reassignment surgery the previous year.

In 2015, the Spanish Association of Transsexuals awarded her the Transexualia prize, recognizing her personal commitment. The then-president of the Community of Madrid, Cristina Cifuentes, attended the awards ceremony.

Multiple media outlets have called Pachón the first trans person in the Spanish Armed Forces. Pachón has said she believes that Spanish society still has a long way to go in terms of equality for the LGBTQ community.
