= Rosalía Gonzalo =

Spanish politician

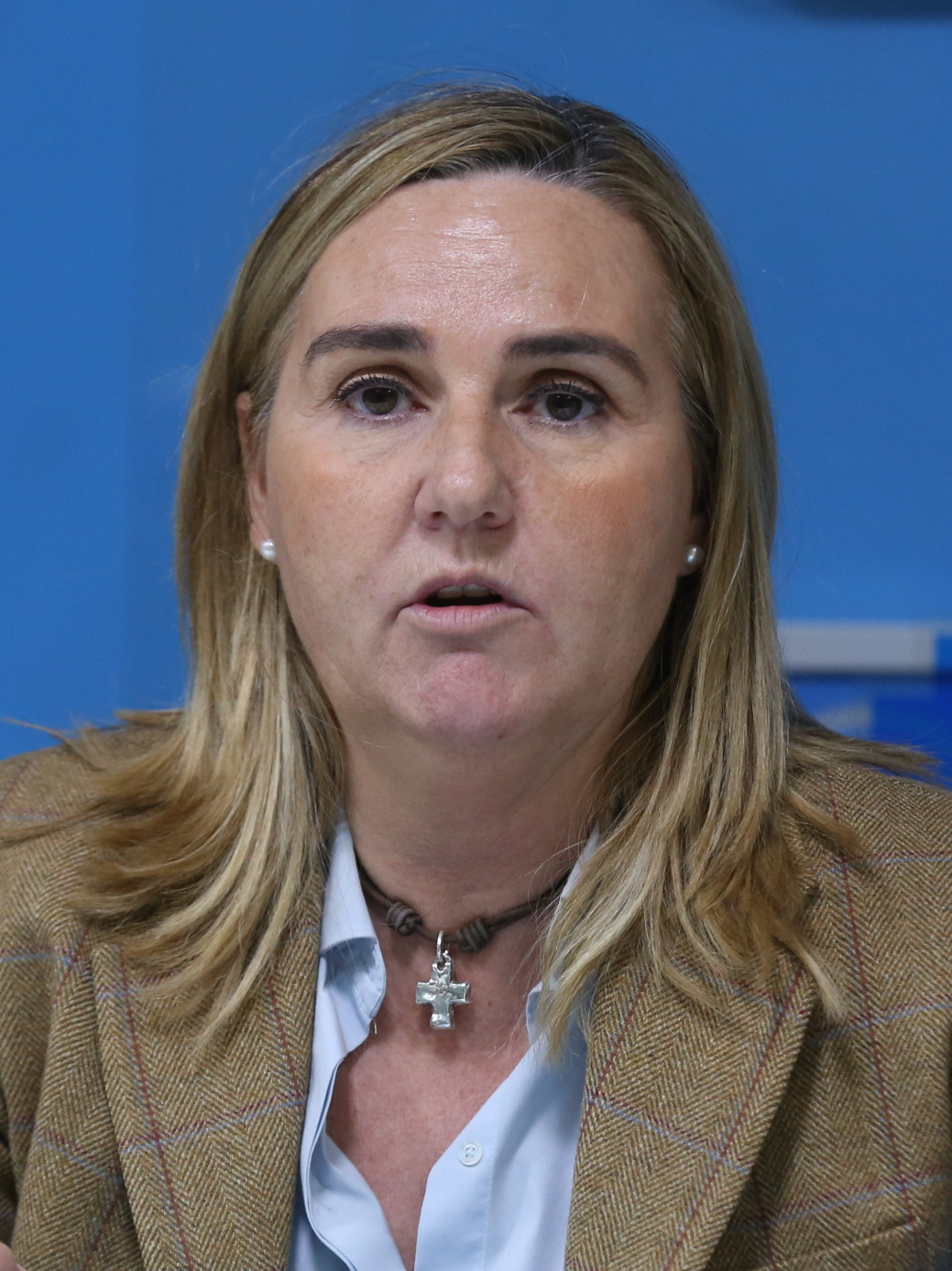

Minister of Transport, Housing and Infrastructures of the Community of Madrid
- Incumbent
- Assumed office 27 September 2017
- Preceded by: Pedro Rollán

Personal details
- Born: 2 May 1969 (age 57) Guadalajara, Spain
- Party: People's Party
- Education: Complutense University of Madrid

Rosalía Gonzalo López (born 1969) is a Spanish politician, member of the People's Party (PP).

== Career ==
Born on 2 May 1969 in Guadalajara. She graduated in Sociology in the Universidad Complutense de Madrid. She was chief of staff of Cristina Cifuentes when the later was in charge of the Delegation of the Government in the Community of Madrid (2012–2015). Elected as MP in the 2015 regional election within the People's Party list, she became First Secretary of the regional parliament's board. In the midst of a reshuffle of the regional government, Cifuentes appointed her as Minister of Transport, Housing and Infrastructures of her cabinet in September 2017. She kept the same office in the new Garrido cabinet formed in May 2018.
