= President of the Community of Madrid =

Political position in Madrid

- Coat of arms of the Community of Madrid

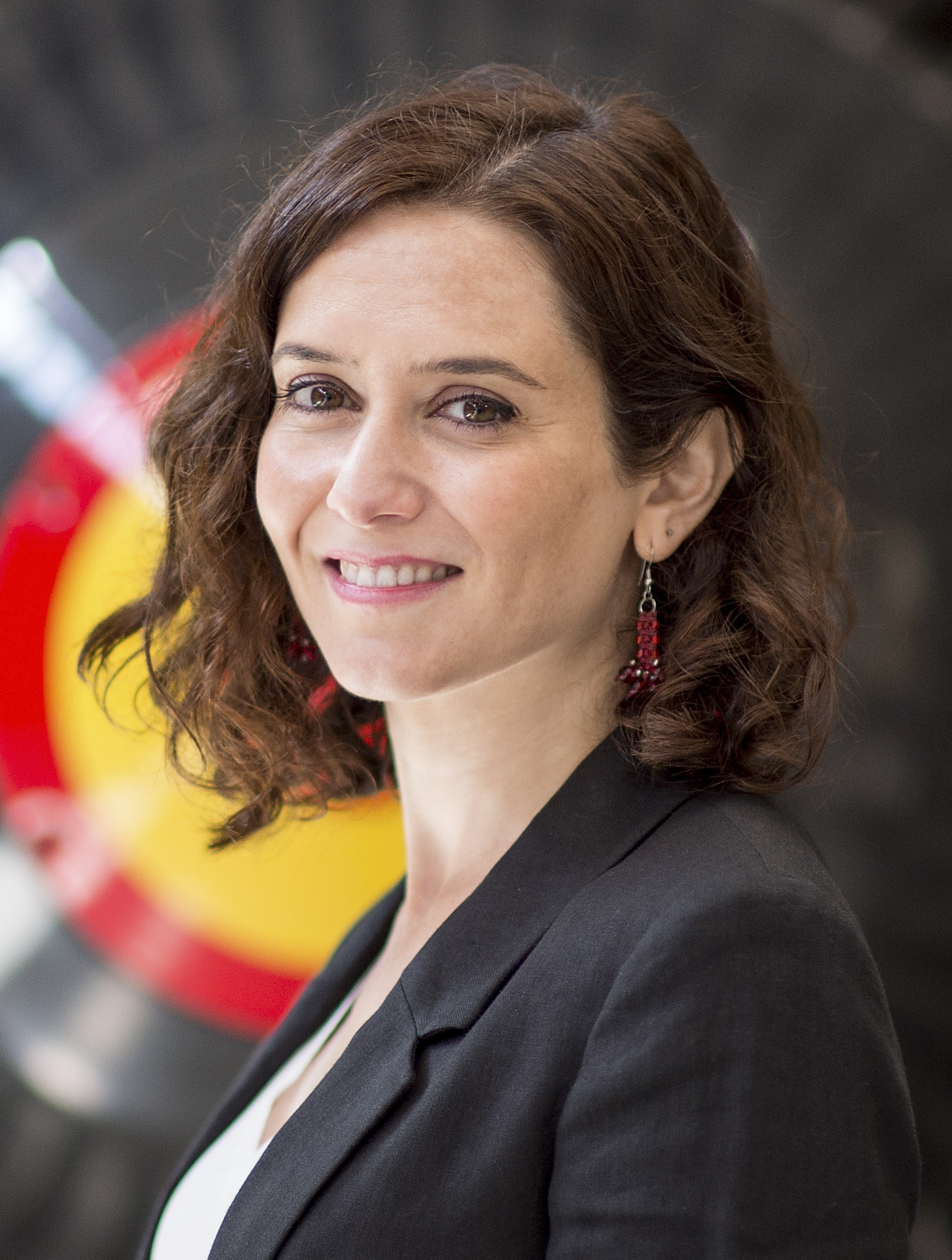
- Incumbent; Isabel Díaz Ayuso since 17 August 2019
- Style: Excelentisimo/a señor/a (The Most Excellent)
- Nominator: Assembly of Madrid
- Appointer: The Monarch countersigned by the Prime Minister
- Term length: Four years
- Inaugural holder: Joaquín Leguina
- Formation: 15 June 1983
- Website: Comunidad de Madrid

The president of the Community of Madrid is the highest-ranking officer of the Autonomous Community of Madrid and the head of the executive branch. The office is currently held by Isabel Díaz Ayuso of the People's Party.

== Origins and election ==
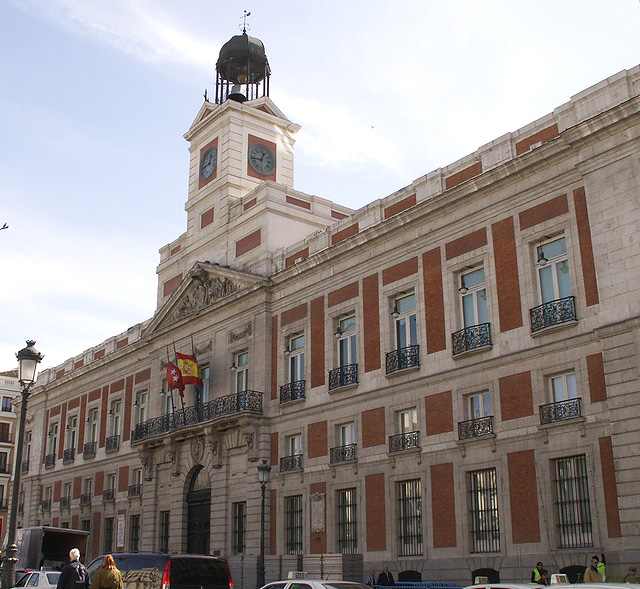
The Royal Post Office is the current seat of the office of the President of Madrid

In the process of the democracy restoration in Spain between 1975–1978, the nationalist and regionalist parties pressed to grant home rule to parts of Spain. Finally, the Constitution stated that any province or group of provinces could form an autonomous community and thus be granted partial home rule. The Autonomous Community of Madrid (Spanish Comunidad Autónoma de Madrid) was created in 1982, and since then regional elections are held every 4 years.

The citizens of the Autonomous Communities of Spain do not elect a person for presidency of their community: but rather they elect the regional legislature, and that legislature elects the regional president. A candidate needs a majority (that is supposed to be loyal to him/her during the whole term) to be elected, but the top-voted party can be denied the right to form the government. This situation, though infrequent in nationwide elections, often happens in local/regional legislatures throughout Spain: the most usual coalition is between the Socialist Party (PSOE) and the United Left (IU).

In Madrid, such a coalition was formed in the 2nd term, in which the incumbent Socialist Joaquín Leguina obtained the most votes but not a majority, once more in the 3rd term, allowing him to remain in office even after having obtained fewer votes than the People's Party (PP), and once more in the 6th term, by the PSOE candidate Rafael Simancas. However, this last coalition ultimately failed due to the dissidence of two PSOE Assembly Members, which denounced the pact with IU as being too wide and unrepresentative of the people's will due to the planned power balance. Elections were repeated after a few weeks and Partido Popular won, then by absolute majority.

Since then, the People's Party victories by absolute majority were repeated in 2007 and 2011's regional elections. After the resignation of President Esperanza Aguirre, nominally due to personal matters in late 2012, her deputy president Ignacio González held the post. The People's Party obtained the most votes in 2015 but lost its absolute majority. Its candidate Cristina Cifuentes was invested president after an agreement with Citizens. She was replaced by her deputy Ángel Garrido when she resigned after evidence of both a fake master's degree and petty shoplifting came out.

== List of officeholders ==
Governments:

- PSOE
- PP
- Mixed coalition

Portrait	Name (Birth–Death)	Term of office			Party	Government Composition	Election	Monarch (Reign)	Ref.
Portrait	Name (Birth–Death)	Took office	Left office	Duration	Party	Government Composition	Election	Monarch (Reign)	Ref.
	Joaquín Leguina (born 1941)	15 June 1983	22 July 1987	12 years and 15 days	PSOE	Leguina I PSOE	1983	King; Juan Carlos I (1975–2014)	
	Joaquín Leguina (born 1941)	22 July 1987	13 July 1991	12 years and 15 days	PSOE	Leguina II; PSOE	1987	King; Juan Carlos I (1975–2014)	
	Joaquín Leguina (born 1941)	13 July 1991	30 June 1995	12 years and 15 days	PSOE	Leguina III; PSOE	1991	King; Juan Carlos I (1975–2014)	
	Alberto Ruiz-Gallardón (born 1958)	30 June 1995	8 July 1999	8 years and 144 days	PP	Gallardón I PP	1995	King; Juan Carlos I (1975–2014)	
	Alberto Ruiz-Gallardón (born 1958)	8 July 1999	21 November 2003	8 years and 144 days	PP	Gallardón II; PP	1999	King; Juan Carlos I (1975–2014)	
	Alberto Ruiz-Gallardón (born 1958)	8 July 1999	21 November 2003	8 years and 144 days	PP	Gallardón II; PP	May 2003	King; Juan Carlos I (1975–2014)	
	Esperanza Aguirre (born 1952)	21 November 2003	20 June 2007	8 years and 301 days	PP	Aguirre I PP	Oct. 2003	King; Juan Carlos I (1975–2014)	
	Esperanza Aguirre (born 1952)	20 June 2007	16 June 2011	8 years and 301 days	PP	Aguirre II; PP	2007	King; Juan Carlos I (1975–2014)	
	Esperanza Aguirre (born 1952)	16 June 2011	17 September 2012 (resigned)	8 years and 301 days	PP	Aguirre III; PP	2011	King; Juan Carlos I (1975–2014)	
During this interval, Vice President Ignacio González served as acting officeholder.						Aguirre III; PP	2011	King; Juan Carlos I (1975–2014)	
	Ignacio González (born 1960)	27 September 2012	25 June 2015	2 years and 271 days	PP	González; PP	2011	King; Juan Carlos I (1975–2014)	
	Ignacio González (born 1960)	27 September 2012	25 June 2015	2 years and 271 days	PP	González; PP	2011	King; Felipe VI (2014–present)	
	Cristina Cifuentes (born 1964)	25 June 2015	25 April 2018 (resigned)	2 years and 304 days	PP	Cifuentes; PP	2015	King; Felipe VI (2014–present)	
During this interval, Minister of the Presidency Ángel Garrido served as acting officeholder.						Cifuentes; PP	2015	King; Felipe VI (2014–present)	
	Ángel Garrido (born 1964)	19 May 2018	11 April 2019 (resigned)	327 days	PP	Garrido; PP	2015	King; Felipe VI (2014–present)	
During this interval, Vice President Pedro Rollán served as acting officeholder.						Garrido; PP	2015	King; Felipe VI (2014–present)	
	Isabel Díaz Ayuso (born 1978)	17 August 2019	19 June 2021	7 years and 21 days	PP	Ayuso I PP–Cs until Mar 2021; PP from Mar 2021	2019	King; Felipe VI (2014–present)	
	Isabel Díaz Ayuso (born 1978)	19 June 2021	23 June 2023	7 years and 21 days	PP	Ayuso II; PP	2021	King; Felipe VI (2014–present)	
	Isabel Díaz Ayuso (born 1978)	23 June 2023	Incumbent	7 years and 21 days	PP	Ayuso III; PP	2023	King; Felipe VI (2014–present)	
