= Lucía Figar =

Spanish politician

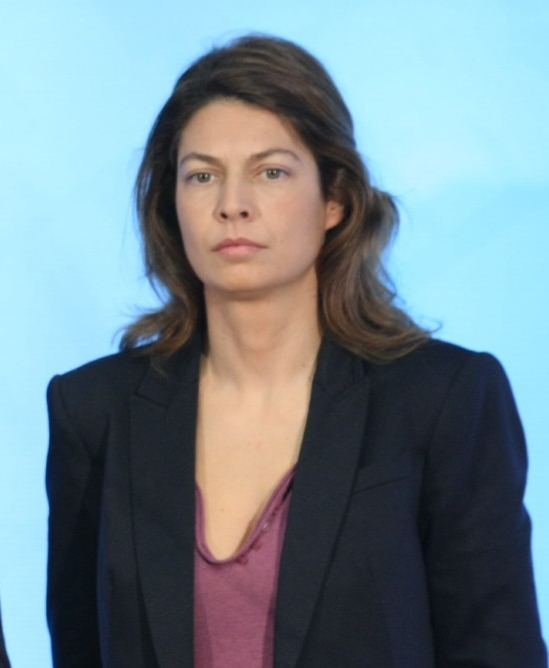
Lucía Figar (2011)

Lucía Figar de Lacalle (born Madrid, 4 February 1975) is a Spanish politician in the People's Party (PP). She was the Minister of Education, Youth and Sports in the Government of the Community of Madrid during the period of 2012 to 2015, when she resigned after being charged in Operación Púnica. She serves as secretary of Communication in the People's Party of the Madrid Community.

She is noted as a representative figure of the so-called Clan de Becerril, a generation of PP cadres tasked with the privatization of public education and health services.
