= Yolanda Ibarrola =

Spanish lawyer and politician

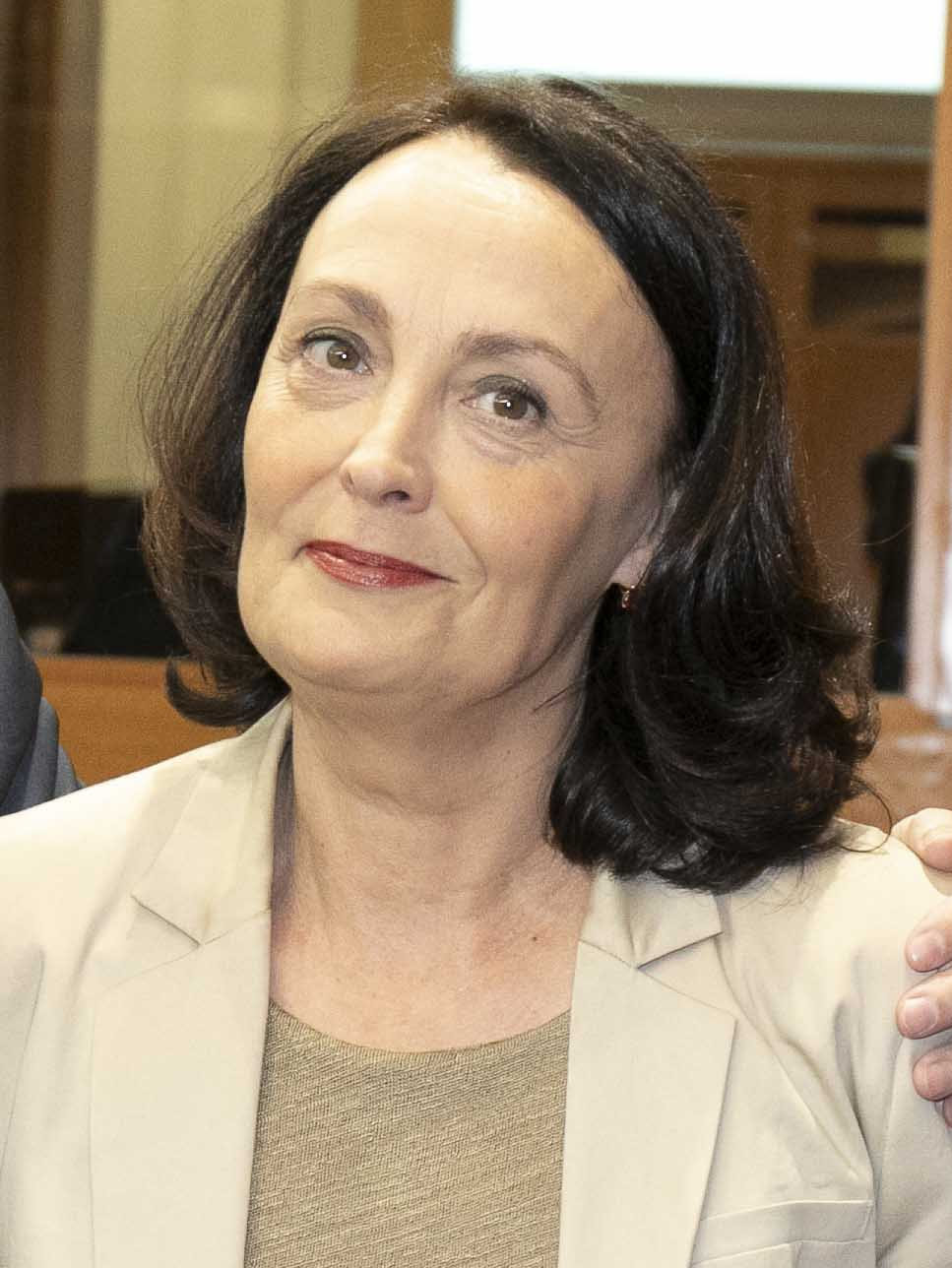

Minister of Justice of the Community of Madrid
- Incumbent
- Assumed office 22 May 2018

Personal details
- Born: 1964 (age 61–62) Madrid, Spain
- Education: Complutense University of Madrid
- Occupation: Lawyer and politician

Yolanda Ibarrola de la Fuente (born 1964) is a Spanish lawyer and politician. She has exercised her political activity within the structure of the regional government of the Community of Madrid.

== Biography ==
Born in 1964 in Madrid. She graduated in Law in the Complutense University of Madrid and became a lawyer. She incorporated into the regional government of the Community of Madrid in 2001 and later became vice-minister of Justice and Public Administrations.

She was acting minister of Justice of the Community of Madrid between May and October 2003 in the caretaking cabinet formed by Alberto Ruiz-Gallardón after the so-called "Tamayazo" scandal.

Director General of European Affairs and Cooperation with the State of the Community of Madrid between 2015 and 2017, and then Director General of Justice since 2017, she was appointed as minister of Justice of the regional cabinet presided by Ángel Garrido and formed in 2018. She assumed office on 22 May.
