= Pedro Rollán =

Spanish politician (born 1969)

The Most Excellent Pedro Rollán
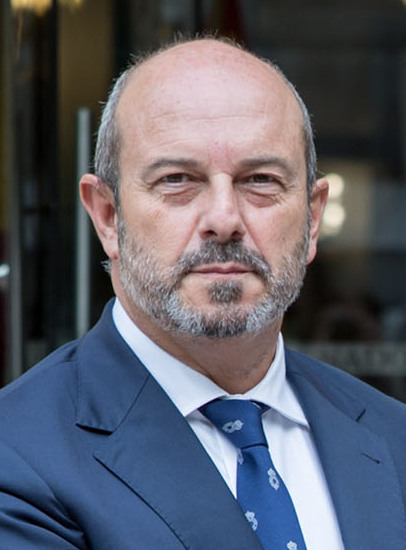
- Rollán in 2024

63rd President of the Senate
- Incumbent
- Assumed office 17 August 2023
- Monarch: Felipe VI
- Vice President: Javier Maroto; Guillermo Fernández Vara
- Preceded by: Ander Gil

President of the Community of Madrid
- Acting; 11 April 2019 – 17 August 2019
- Monarch: Felipe VI
- Preceded by: Ángel Garrido
- Succeeded by: Isabel Díaz Ayuso

Vice President of the Community of Madrid
- In office 22 May 2018 – 20 August 2019
- President: Ángel Garrido
- Preceded by: Office established (previously Ignacio González)
- Succeeded by: Ignacio Aguado

Member of the Assembly of Madrid
- In office 9 June 2015 – 31 January 2020

Member of the Senate
- Incumbent
- Assumed office 3 December 2019
- Constituency: Madrid

Personal details
- Born: 21 March 1969 (age 57) Madrid
- Citizenship: Spanish
- Party: PP
- Occupation: Politician

Pedro Manuel Rollán Ojeda (born 21 March 1969) is a Spanish politician who served as acting President of the Community of Madrid between April and August 2019.

From 2007 to 2015, he served as mayor of Torrejón de Ardoz.

He has been a member of the People's Party (PP) since 1994, and between 1995 and 2003 he was manager of the commercial division of the central area in Schweppes Spain.
