= Alfonso Serrano (politician) =

Spanish politician (born 1976)

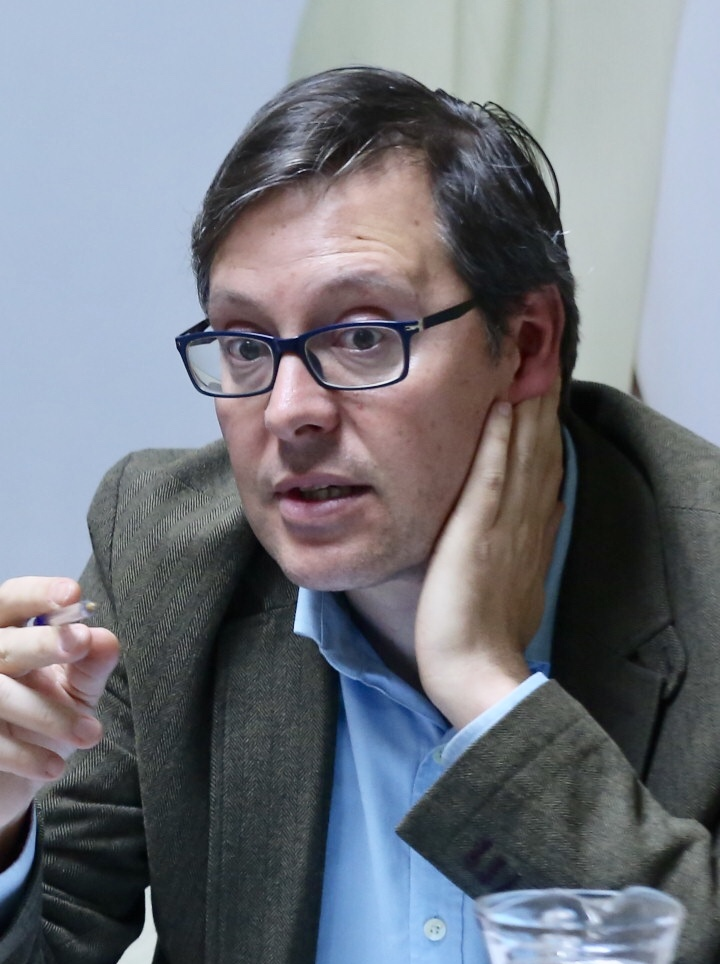
- Serrano in 2018

Member of the Senate
- Incumbent
- Assumed office 14 July 2023
- Appointed by: Assembly of Madrid

Personal details
- Born: 20 February 1976 (age 50)
- Party: People's Party

Alfonso Carlos Serrano Sánchez-Capuchino (born 20 February 1976) is a Spanish politician serving as a member of the Senate since 2023. He has been a member of the Assembly of Madrid since 2011.
