= Ignacio González (politician) =

Spanish politician (born 1960)

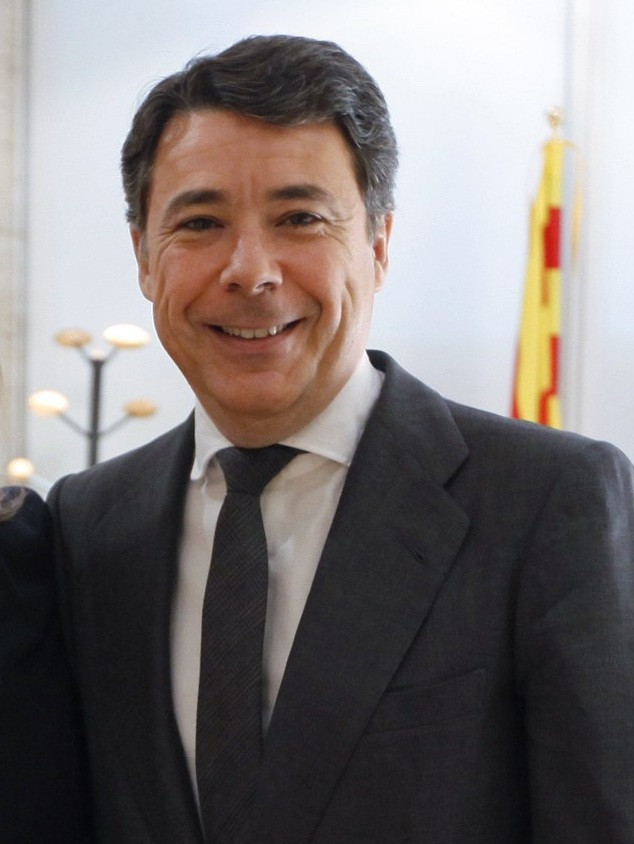

4th President of the Community of Madrid
- In office 26 September 2012 – 24 June 2015; Acting: 17–26 September 2012
- Monarchs: Juan Carlos I Felipe VI
- Preceded by: Esperanza Aguirre
- Succeeded by: Cristina Cifuentes

Member of the Assembly of Madrid
- In office 27 May 2007 – 8 June 2015

Personal details
- Born: 19 October 1960 (age 65) Madrid, Spain
- Party: PP
- Spouse: Lourdes Cavero Mestre
- Relations: Pablo (brother)

Jaime Ignacio González González (born 19 October 1960) is a Spanish politician and member of the Partido Popular. A native of Madrid, González served as the president of the Community of Madrid, one of the seventeen autonomous communities of Spain, from 26 September 2012 to June 2015.

== Political career ==
González's predecessor, Esperanza Aguirre, resigned from office in September 2012 citing declining health. González held his first official meeting with Prime Minister Mariano Rajoy at Moncloa Palace on 15 October 2012, two weeks after taking office as president of the Community. González continued to be involved with running the public water company Canal de Isabel II.

== Investigations ==
Since 2016 González has been subject to an investigation into his relationship with former minister of labour Eduardo Zaplana and businessmen linked to politics. As a result of these investigations known as Operación Lezo, González was arrested on corruption charges on 19 April 2017. He was held on remand from April to November 2017 at Soto del Real prison.

Political offices
Preceded by Juan Ramón García Secades	Undersecretary of Education; 1996–1999	Succeeded by Ana María Pastor Julián
Preceded by Francisco Villar	Secretary of State for Public Administration; 1999–2002	Succeeded by Julio Gómez-Pomar
Preceded by Carlos Mayor Oreja	Vice President of the Community of Madrid; 2003–2012	Succeeded by Office abolished
Preceded by Santiago Fisas	Regional Minister of Culture and Sports of Madrid; 2009–2012	Succeeded by Ana Isabel Mariño
Preceded by Esperanza Aguirre	President of the Community of Madrid; 2012–2015	Succeeded by Cristina Cifuentes
