= Esperanza Aguirre =

Spanish politician (born 1952)

The Most Excellent Esperanza Aguirre Countess of Bornos GE DBE
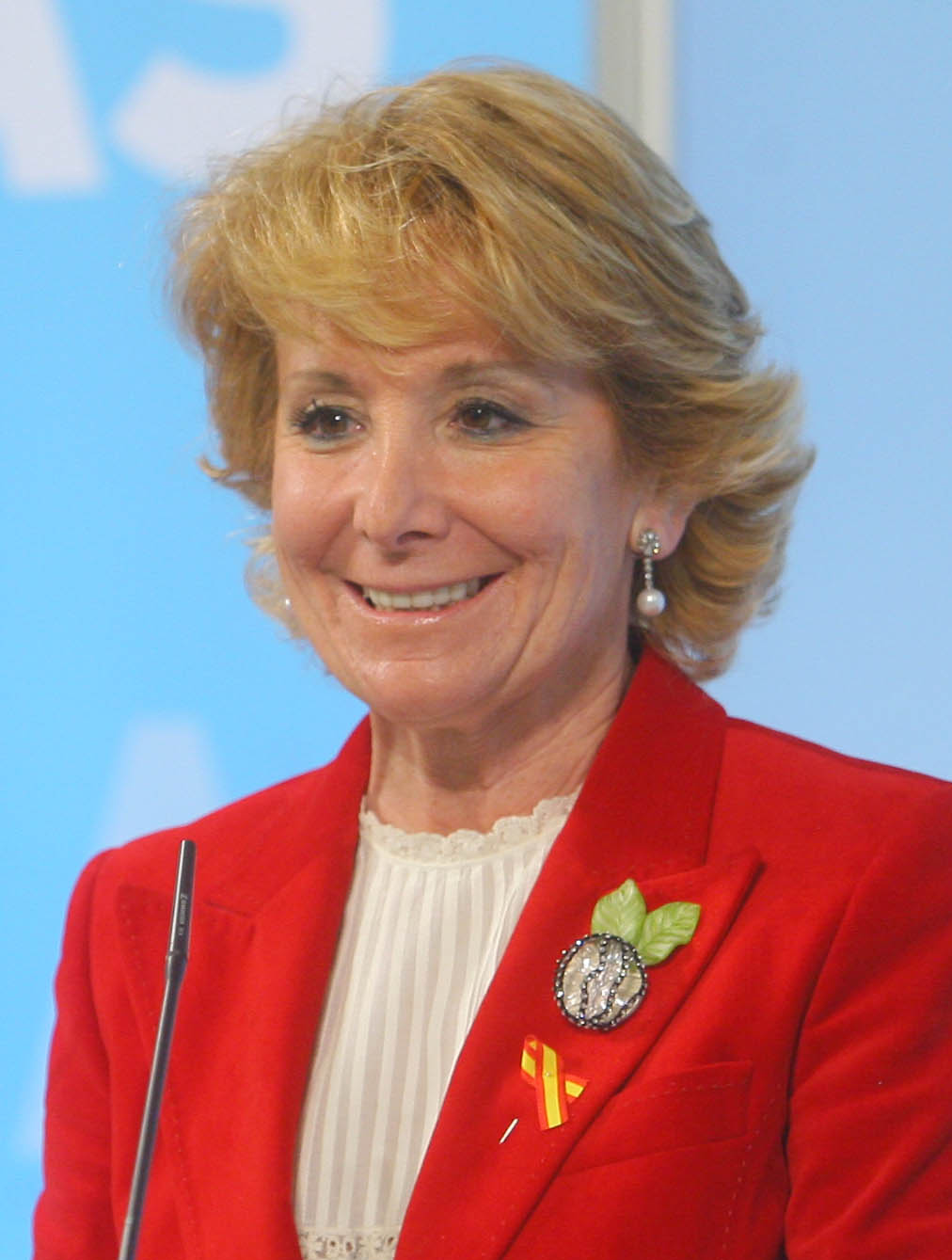

3rd President of the Community of Madrid
- In office 8 November 2003 – 26 September 2012
- Monarch: Juan Carlos I
- Preceded by: Alberto Ruiz-Gallardón
- Succeeded by: Ignacio González

56th President of the Senate
- In office 9 February 1999 – 16 October 2002
- Preceded by: Juan Ignacio Barrero
- Succeeded by: Juan José Lucas

Minister of Education, Culture and Sport
- In office 5 May 1996 – 19 January 1999
- Prime Minister: José María Aznar
- Preceded by: Jerónimo Saavedra (Education); Carmen Alborch (Culture)
- Succeeded by: Mariano Rajoy

Member of the Senate
- In office 3 March 1996 – 21 November 2002
- Constituency: Madrid

Member of the Assembly of Madrid
- In office 25 May 2003 – 19 September 2012

Personal details
- Born: Esperanza Fuencisla Aguirre y Gil de Biedma; 3 January 1952 (age 74) Madrid, Spain
- Party: Liberal Union (1983–1984); Liberal Party (1984–1986); People's Alliance (1987–1989); People's Party (1989–present)
- Spouse: Fernando Ramírez de Haro (m. 1974)
- Children: 2, including Fernando
- Education: Complutense University
- Occupation: Politician, civil servant

Esperanza Aguirre y Gil de Biedma, Countess of Bornos DBE (Spanish pronunciation: [espeˈɾanθa aˈɣire]; born 3 January 1952) is a Spanish politician. As member of the People's Party (PP), she served as President of the Senate between 1999 and 2002 (becoming the first female politician to have held the post), as President of the Community of Madrid between 2003 and 2012 and as Minister of Education and Culture (1996–1999). She also chaired the People's Party of the Community of Madrid between 2004 and 2016.

== Biography ==
=== Early life ===
Aguirre was born in Madrid on 3 January 1952 being the eldest daughter of José Luis Aguirre Borrell, a noted lawyer, and Piedad Gil de Biedma Vega de Seoane, the sister of the poet Jaime Gil de Biedma. She is also second cousin of the photographer Ouka Leele. She studied in the La Asunción School and in the British Council School of Madrid and earned a degree in Law at the Complutense University of Madrid in 1974. Aside from Spanish, she is reportedly fluent in English and French, has basic notions of Italian and "understands" Catalan.

In 1974, Aguirre married Fernando Ramírez de Haro, 15th Count of Murillo, 16th Count of Bornos (Grandee of Spain), with whom she has had two sons: Fernando (born 1976) and Álvaro (born 1980).

In 1976, Aguirre became a civil servant, as member of the Corps of Information of Tourism's Technicians. She was head of the Department of Publicity and Tourism, where she remained until 1979. Subsequently, she had many different jobs in the Ministry of Culture, serving several Ministers during the Democratic Centre Union governments; especially designated by the Prime Minister himself. In 1979, she was chief of staff of the General Director of Literature and Cinematography. She was appointed Deputy General Director of Studies of the Technical General Secretariat of the Ministry of Culture in 1980. In 1981, she was appointed Deputy General Director in the Advisory Staff of the Secretary of State of Culture. Her last position with the Administration was as Deputy General Director of Cultural Associations.

=== First spell in local politics ===
Since her early years Aguirre had been a member of the Club Liberal of Madrid, which was presided over by Pedro Schwartz. Schwartz reportedly played an important role in the beginnings of Aguirre's political career: in 1983, he was the one to convince her, by then a civil servant; to stand as candidate in the Madrid local elections running in the list of the political alliance between Schwartz's Liberal Union, the People's Alliance and the People's Democratic Party. She was elected as became a municipal councillor. While in opposition, she was a member of the Standing Committee of the Madrid City Council, a CP spokeswoman on the areas of Culture, Education, Youth and Sports Affairs, and the Moncloa-Aravaca district. When the Liberal Union merged with the Liberal Party in December 1984, she held different positions in the National Executive and the Political Council of José Antonio Segurado's Liberal Party.

In 1987, she left the Liberal Party and joined Popular Alliance, which later, in 1989, was refounded as the People's Party (PP). She was subsequently re-elected to the city council and continued in opposition until 1989, when a successful vote of no confidence ousted the PSOE mayor Juan Barranco, which allowed the PP and Democratic and Social Centre (CDS) to govern Madrid for the first time since the restoration of competitive municipal elections in 1979, under the Mayorship of Agustín Rodríguez Sahagún (CDS). In the new local executive, she was designated head of the Department of the Environment.

The PP won a council majority in the 1991 election and José María Álvarez del Manzano was subsequently invested as new mayor, with Aguirre remaining in the municipal government board. Two years later, in 1993, in the reshuffle that followed the fall from grace of firebrand councillor Ángel Matanzo, she assumed additional competences becoming Councillor of Environment, Education, Culture and Sports. In June 1995, after the May election, she became the municipal spokeswoman of the PP and first deputy mayor. Soon after, she was also appointed by the City Council to the Caja Madrid Board of Governors.

=== Minister of Education, Culture and Sports ===
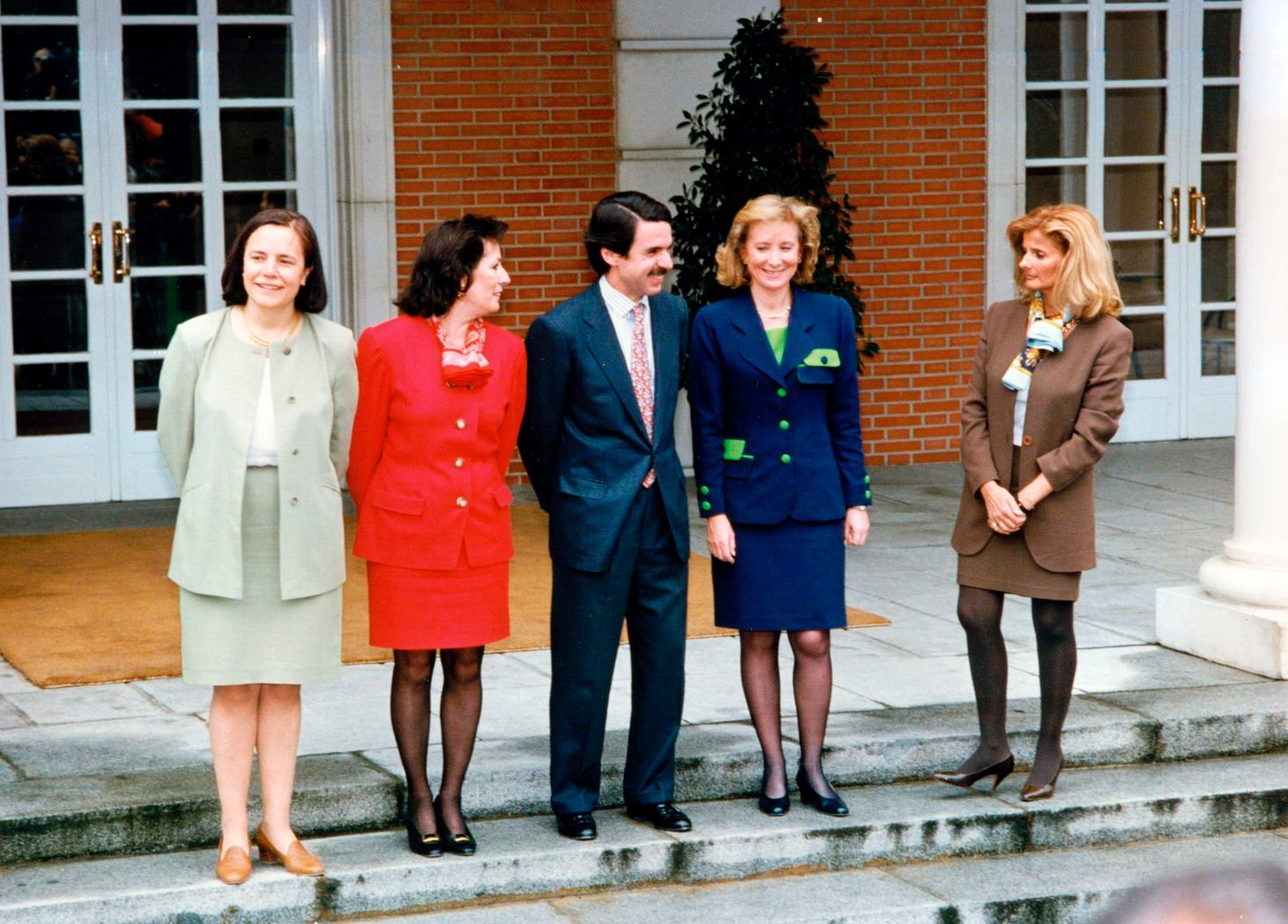
Aguirre in May 1996 next to the PM José María Aznar and fellow ministers Loyola de Palacio, Margarita Mariscal de Gante and Isabel Tocino.

In the general election of 1996 she was the candidate for the Senate for Madrid of the People's Party, after her designation as a member of the National Executive Committee of the Party; and she became a senator. The then new President, José María Aznar, appointed her to be Minister of Education, Culture and Sports. She was succeeded in those posts in 1999 by Mariano Rajoy.

=== President of the Senate ===
Aguirre, a Senator since 1996, was elected President of the Senate in February 1999, the first woman to do so. In March 2000, she was re-elected Senator for Madrid, becoming the top-voted candidate in Spain with 1.55 million votes and 50.7% of the popular vote, a percentage record still unbroken. She resigned in 2002 to run for the Presidency of the Autonomous Community of Madrid in the regional Assembly elections of 2003. She was substituted as President of the Senate by Juan José Lucas.

=== Tamayazo ===
When the regional elections took place in May 2003, the People's Party won a plurality of seats. The People's Party won 55 seats in the Madrid Assembly, being the only party of the right in the Assembly. On the left, PSOE won 47 seats and United Left won 9 seats, thus making it possible for a coalition of PSOE and IU to rule. However, the election of a leftist coalition was not possible due to two dissenting deputies of the PSOE, Eduardo Tamayo and María Teresa Sáez, who refused to obey the party whip in the first two votes, the election of the speaker and the election of the president.

=== Presidency of the Community of Madrid ===
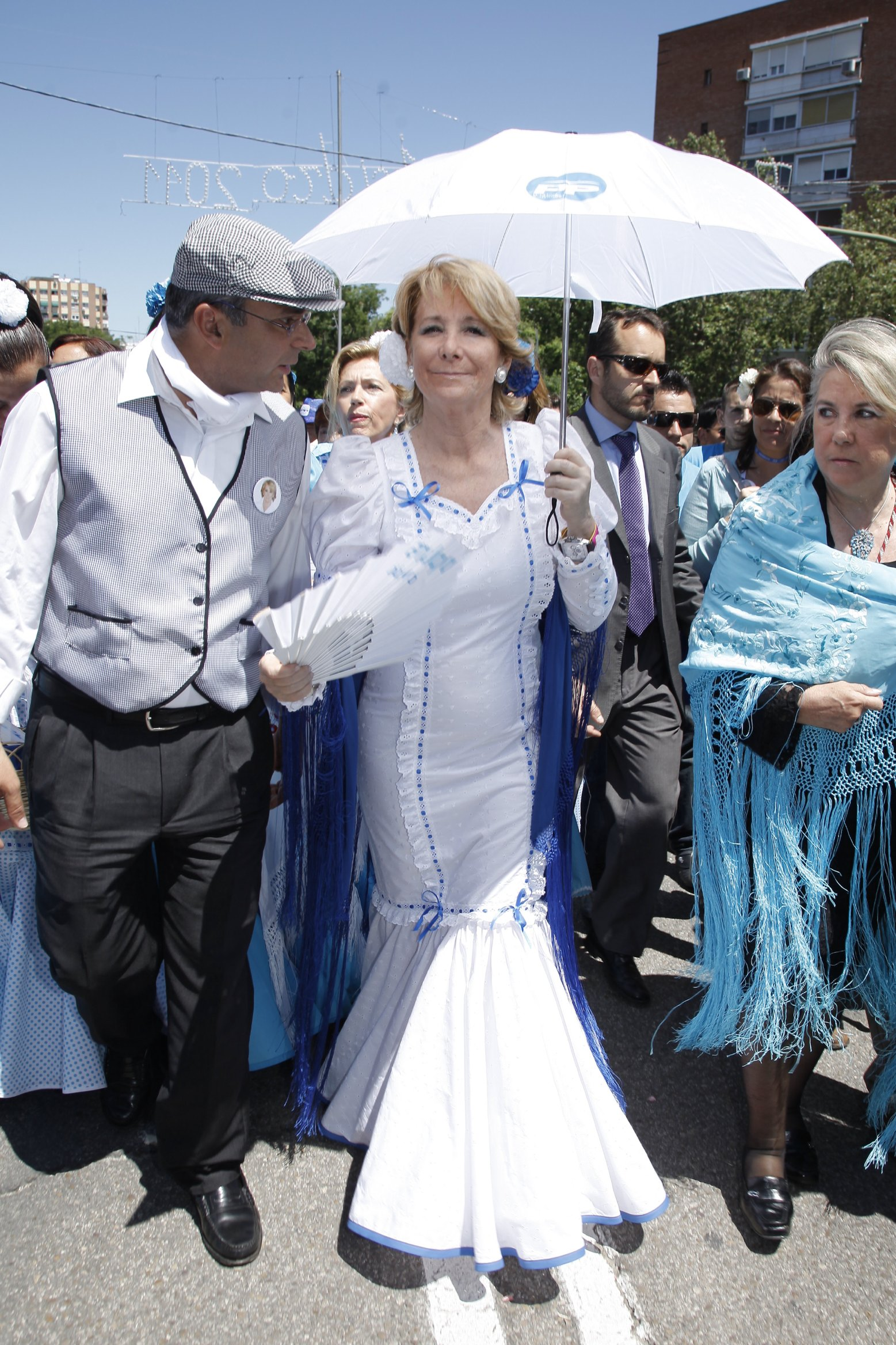
Dressed as chulapa during the campaign for the 2011 regional election

In October 2003, following the scandal of the dissenting deputies, the regional elections were rerun. The People's Party won a qualified majority of seats, which enabled Aguirre's investiture as President of the Community of Madrid. Aguirre's most important stated achievements in those years were the reduction of surgery waiting times, the building of eight new hospitals and 87 new state schools (most of them bilingual), an increase in the investment for several scholarships of education, and the expansion of the Underground to suburban areas such as Pozuelo de Alarcón. The period included the peak of the Spanish construction bubble, and many of her associates would later end up indicted for corruption.

On 1 December 2005, the helicopter Aguirre was travelling on alongside Mariano Rajoy crashed shortly after taking off from the bullring of Móstoles. Aguirre managed to pull herself out of the helicopter without suffering any injuries.

On 27 November 2008, she survived without injury the 2008 Mumbai attacks when shooting began in the Oberoi Trident while she was checking in.

Aguirre announced her retirement as president on 17 September 2012, citing health issues, and that she would return to her career as a civil servant at the Ministry of Tourism.

=== Activity after her resignation as regional president ===
Aguirre remained as President of the People's Party of the Community of Madrid. On 13 January 2013 the Seeliger and Conde Foundation, an executive search firm, announced the appointment of Esperanza Aguirre as Chairwoman of its Advisory Council, an office compatible with the role of Chairwoman of the People's Party of the Community of Madrid.

=== Comeback to local politics ===
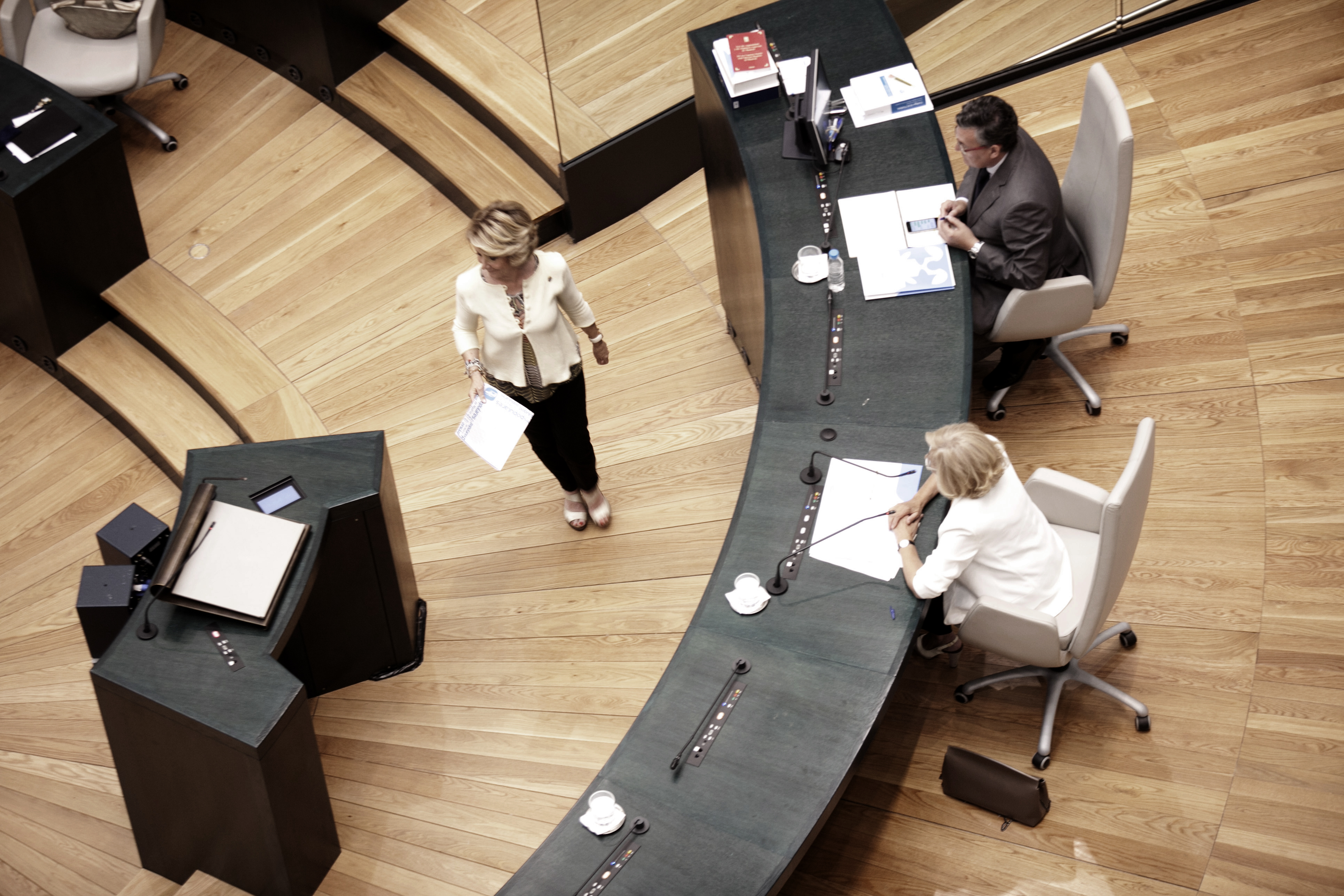
Aguirre on 13 June 2015, during the inaugural session of the new municipal council in which Manuela Carmena was invested as Mayor.

Designated in 2015 by Mariano Rajoy as the PP's Mayoral candidate for the municipality of Madrid, she subsequently ran first in the PP's list for the May 2015 Madrid municipal election. The PP's list obtained a simple majority of 20 seats out of a total 57, short of the qualified majority needed to remain in government without support from other political parties. She then unsuccessfully pressed to reach a three-way deal between the PP, Citizens and the Spanish Socialist Workers' Party (PSOE) to avoid the investiture as Mayor's of the candidate of the left-wing Ahora Madrid, Manuela Carmena, with the support of the PSOE's municipal councillors. Soon after the investiture of Carmena as Mayor on 13 June 2015, Aguirre unsuccessfully proposed again another deal with Citizens and the PSOE to oust Carmena.

In 2016, Aguirre resigned from her position as regional party president, ostensibly due to the many corruption cases in the Madrilenian PP under her watch. She retained her position of opposition leader in the Madrid municipal government, and the overall maneuver was widely interpreted as a broadside against her party rival, Prime Minister Mariano Rajoy.

On 24 April 2017, she resigned as municipal councillor (and from all relating offices) after the imprisonment of her former right-hand man, Ignacio González (also her successor as regional president) for misappropriation of public funds in the Lezo corruption scandal. She was replaced as spokesperson of the PP municipal group by José Luis Martínez-Almeida.

=== Life after retirement and judicial case ===
After her retirement, she divided her spare time between the dedication to her 6 grandchildren and her passion for golf. Following an August 2019 request filed by the Prosecution service of the Audiencia Nacional before the instructing judge Manuel García-Castellón, the former charged Aguirre (along with her successors in the presidency of the Madrid region, Ignacio González and Cristina Cifuentes) with alleged crimes of illicit funding, diversion of public money and document forgery on 2 September 2019 in the proceedings of the Púnica corruption case. García-Castellón, pointed out on a tentative basis the alleged "decisive and essential" role of Aguirre in the PP's illegal funding scheme, through which more than 6 million euros were subtracted from 8 regional ministries and agencies.

On 19 March 2020 alongside her husband, Aguirre was admitted to the hospital after being tested positive for COVID-19 during coronavirus pandemic in Spain.

== Positions and ideology ==
Esperanza Aguirre self-defines as a "liberal". Known by her professed anglophilia, she has cited her admiration for the figure of Margaret Thatcher. According to Jorge del Palacio, Aguirre aimed to develop a Spanish version of the uneasy union between conservatism and the liberalism inspired by Friederich Hayek. She has often been regarded as a leading figure of the most conservative wing of the PP, and, having reportedly held political differences and an uneasy personal relationship with PP's leader Mariano Rajoy, she personally asked the latter for a change in the leadership of the party before the June 2016 general election.

== Heraldry ==
Heraldry of Esperanza Aguirre

Coat of arms of Esperanza Aguirre, Grandee of Spain

== Decorations ==
- Grand Cross of the Royal and Distinguished Spanish Order of Charles III (22 January 1999)
- Grand Cross of the Royal and American Order of Isabella the Catholic (23 January 2004)
- Grand Cross of the Order of Civil Merit (23 April 2004)
- Grand Cross of the Civil Order of Alfonso X the Wise (26 December 2014)
- Gold Medal of the Community of Madrid (20 April 2012)

Foreign

- Dame Grand Cross of the Order of the Sun of Peru (8 June 2004)
- Honorary Dame Commander of the Most Excellent Order of the British Empire (4 February 2004)
- Officer of the Legion of Honour

Scholastic

- Honorary Doctorate, Alfonso X El Sabio University (16 April 2013)

Political offices
| Preceded by Luis María Huete | First Deputy Mayor of the City Council of Madrid; 1995–1996 | Succeeded by José Ignacio Echeverría |
| Preceded by Jerónimo Saavedra as Minister of Education | Minister of Education and Culture; 1996–1999 | Succeeded by Mariano Rajoy |
| Preceded by Carmen Alborch as Minister of Culture | Minister of Education and Culture; 1996–1999 | Succeeded by Mariano Rajoy |
| Preceded by Juan Ignacio Barrero | President of the Senate; 1999–2002 | Succeeded by Juan José Lucas |
| Preceded by Alberto Ruiz-Gallardón | President of the Community of Madrid; 2003–2012 | Succeeded by Ignacio González |
Party political offices
| Preceded by Luis María Huete | Leader of the People's Party Group in the City Council of Madrid; 1995–1996 | Succeeded by José Ignacio Echeverría |
| Preceded by Miguel Ángel Villanueva | Leader of the People's Party Group in the Assembly of Madrid; 2003 | Succeeded by Antonio Beteta |
| Preceded by Pío García-Escudero | President of the People's Party of the Community of Madrid; 2004–2016 | Succeeded by Cristina Cifuentes (vacant until 2017) |
| Preceded by Enrique Núñez | Spokesperson of the People's Group in the City Council of Madrid; 2015–2017 | Succeeded by José Luis Martínez-Almeida |
