= Government of the Community of Madrid =

Executive and administrative body in Madrid

- Gobierno de la Comunidad de Madrid

Overview
- Polity: Community of Madrid
- Leader: President
- Appointed by: King of Spain
- Responsible to: Assembly of Madrid
- Headquarters: Royal House of the Post Office, Madrid
- Website: www.comunidad.madrid

The Government of the Community of Madrid (Spanish: Gobierno de la Comunidad de Madrid) is the collegiate body charged with the executive and administrative functions of the autonomous community of Madrid, Spain. Until the 1998 reform of the regional statute it was formally called Council of Government of the Community of Madrid (Consejo de Gobierno de la Comunidad de Madrid).

It is headed by the president of the Community of Madrid, and additionally includes the appointed vice presidents and consejeros (cabinet ministers).

The cabinet ceases in office after the holding of legislative elections, remaining in a caretaking role until a new cabinet assumes office.

Its main headquarters are located at the Royal House of the Post Office (Real Casa de Correos), in the Puerta del Sol.

== Cabinets ==
- Leguina I (1983–1987)
- Leguina II (1987–1991)
- Leguina III (1991–1995)
- Gallardón I (1995–1999)
- Gallardón II (1999–2003)
- Aguirre I (2003–2007)
- Aguirre II (2007–2011)
- Aguirre III (2011–2012)
- González (2012–2015)
- Cifuentes (2015–2018)
- Garrido (2018–2019)
- Ayuso I (2019–2021)
- Ayuso II (2021–2023)
- Ayuso III (2023–present)

== Current composition ==
Portfolio	Name	Party	Took office	Left office	Ref.
President	Isabel Díaz Ayuso	PP	23 June 2023	Incumbent	
Minister of the Presidency, Justice and Local Administration and Spokesperson	Miguel Ángel García	PP	23 June 2023	Incumbent	
Minister of Economy, Finance and Employment	Rocío Albert	PP	23 June 2023	Incumbent	
Minister of Digitalization	Miguel López-Valverde Argüeso	PP	23 June 2023	Incumbent	
Minister of Education, Universities, Science	Emilio Viciana	PP (Ind.)	23 June 2023	Incumbent	
Minister of the Housing, Transport and Infrastructures	Jorge Rodrigo	PP	23 June 2023	Incumbent	
Minister of Health	Fátima Matute	PP (Ind.)	23 June 2023	Incumbent	
Minister of Environment, Agriculture and Interior	Carlos Novillo	PP	23 June 2023	Incumbent	
Minister of Family, Youth and Social Policy	Ana Dávila	PP	23 June 2023	Incumbent	
Minister of Culture, Tourism and Sports	Mariano de Paco	PP (Ind.)	23 June 2023	Incumbent	
