= Cristina Cifuentes =

Former Spanish politician (born 1964)

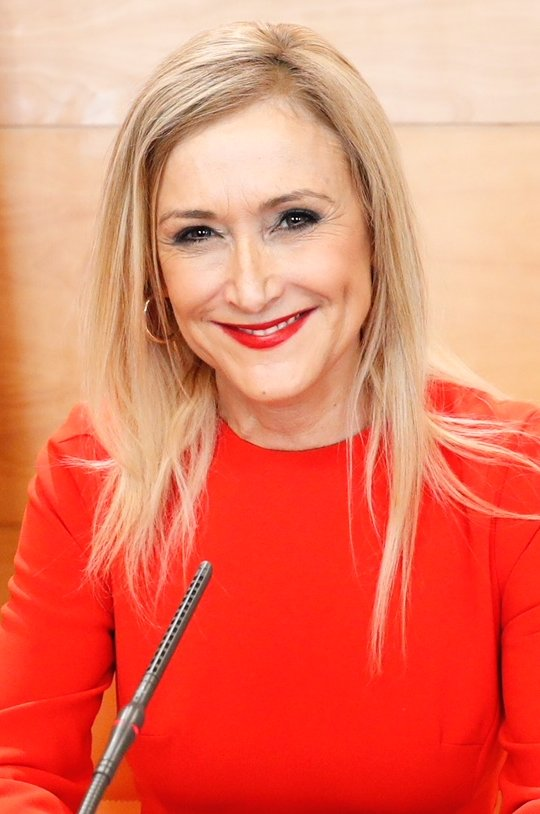

5th President of the Community of Madrid
- In office 24 June 2015 – 25 April 2018
- Monarch: Felipe VI
- Preceded by: Ignacio González
- Succeeded by: Ángel Garrido

President of the People's Party of the Community of Madrid
- In office 18 March 2017 – 27 April 2018
- Preceded by: Esperanza Aguirre
- Succeeded by: Pío García-Escudero

Government Delegate in the Community of Madrid
- In office 16 January 2012 – 13 April 2015
- Preceded by: María Dolores Carrión Martín
- Succeeded by: Concepción Dancausa

Member of the Assembly of Madrid
- In office 20 June 1991 – 16 January 2012

Personal details
- Born: María Cristina Cifuentes Cuencas; 1 July 1964 (age 62) Madrid, Spain
- Party: People's Party (1989‐2019)
- Other political affiliations: People's Alliance (1980–1989)
- Spouse: Francisco Javier Aguilar Viyuela
- Children: 2
- Education: Complutense University of Madrid

María Cristina Cifuentes Cuencas (born 1 July 1964) is a former Spanish politician of the People's Party. She was the President of the Community of Madrid from 24 June 2015 to her 25 April 2018 resignation. From 16 January 2012 to 13 April 2015, she served as the Government Delegate in the Community of Madrid.

== Biography ==
In 1980, when Cifuentes was 16, she became a member of People's Alliance, which would later become the People's Party of Spain. She studied law at the Complutense University of Madrid.

In 2013, she suffered a traffic accident in Madrid while she was riding her motorbike, which put her in a coma for nearly a month.

After being the Government Delegate in Madrid from 2012 to 2015, Cifuentes was elected President of the Autonomous Community of Madrid with the support of the centre-right Spanish party Citizens, having won the 2015 regional election and having obtained 48 representatives out of 129 in the Assembly of Madrid.

On 21 March 2018, Cifuentes was alleged to have fraudulently obtained her master's degree from King Juan Carlos University. On 5 April 2018, a judicial investigation of the case was opened.

On 25 April 2018, she resigned as President of the Community of Madrid, after the release of a 2011 video that showed her being detained in a supermarket for shoplifting (goods worth €40), with Ángel Garrido succeeding her as acting president of the community. On 27 April 2018, she resigned from the presidency of the People's Party of the Community of Madrid. On 8 May 2018, Cifuentes resigned from her seat in the Assembly of Madrid and announced her retirement from politics.

On 2 September 2019 the Audiencia Nacional charged Cifuentes together with fellow former regional premiers Ignacio González and Esperanza Aguirre with alleged crimes of illicit funding, diversion of public money and document forgery in the proceedings of the Púnica corruption case.

As of October 2019, she appeared in the television program Ya es mediodía as a panelist, and in February 2020, she was signed on Todo es mentira.

== Electoral history ==
Electoral history of Cristina Cifuentes
Election	List	Constituency	List position	Result
European Parliament election, 1987	AP	Spain	57th (out of 60)	Not elected
1991 Madrilenian regional election	PP	Community of Madrid	46th (out of 101)	Elected
European Parliament election, 1994	PP	Spain	60th (out of 64)	Not elected
1995 Madrilenian regional election	PP	Community of Madrid	16th (out of 103)	Elected
1999 Madrilenian regional election	PP	Community of Madrid	17th (out of 102)	Elected
May 2003 Madrilenian regional election	PP	Community of Madrid	20th (out of 111)	Elected
October 2003 Madrilenian regional election	PP	Community of Madrid	20th (out of 111)	Elected
2007 Madrilenian regional election	PP	Community of Madrid	13th (out of 120)	Elected
2011 Madrilenian regional election	PP	Community of Madrid	13th (out of 129)	Elected
2015 Madrilenian regional election	PP	Community of Madrid	1st (out of 129)	Elected

Political offices
Preceded by José Ignacio Echeverría	First Vice President of the Assembly of Madrid; 2005–2012	Succeeded by Rosa Posada
Preceded by María Dolores Carrión Martín	Government Delegate in the Community of Madrid; 2012–2015	Succeeded by Concepción Dancausa
Preceded by Ignacio González	President of the Community of Madrid; 2015–2018	Succeeded by Ángel Garrido; Acting
Party political offices
Preceded by Vacant (Esperanza Aguirre in 2016)	President of the People's Party of the Community of Madrid; 2017–2018	Succeeded by Vacant
