= People's Party of the Community of Madrid =

People's Party of the Community of Madrid Partido Popular de la Comunidad de Madrid
- President: Isabel Díaz Ayuso
- Secretary-General: Alfonso Serrano Sánchez-Capuchino
- Founded: 1989
- Headquarters: C/ Génova, 13; Madrid, Spain
- Ideology: Conservatism; Christian democracy; Spanish nationalism; Economic liberalism
- Political position: Right-wing
- National affiliation: PP
- Colors: Sky blue
- Assembly of Madrid: 70 / 135
- Congress of Deputies: 16 / 37 (Madrid seats)
- Senate: 4 / 11 (Madrid seats)
- Local government: 1,051 / 2,317
- Mayors: 114 / 179

Website
- www.ppmadrid.es

The People's Party of the Community of Madrid (Spanish: Partido Popular de la Comunidad de Madrid, PP) is the regional branch of the People's Party in the Community of Madrid, as well as historically one of the most powerful groupings within the PP.

== Leaders ==
=== Party presidents ===
- Luis Eduardo Cortés Muñoz (1989–1993)
- Pío García-Escudero (1993–2004)
- Esperanza Aguirre (2004–2016)
- Caretaker Committee (2016–2017)
  - Cristina Cifuentes (February 2016–February 2017)
  - Juan Carlos Vera (February–March 2017)
- Cristina Cifuentes (2017–2018)
- Pío García-Escudero (2018-2022)
- Isabel Díaz Ayuso (2022–present)

=== Presidents of the Community of Madrid ===
- Alberto Ruiz-Gallardón (1995–2003)
- Esperanza Aguirre (2003–2012)
- Ignacio González (2012–2015)
- Cristina Cifuentes (2015–2018)
- Ángel Garrido (2018–2019)
- Isabel Díaz Ayuso (2019–present)

== Electoral performance ==
=== Assembly of Madrid ===
Assembly of Madrid
Election	Leading candidate	Votes	%	Seats	Gov.
1991	Alberto Ruiz-Gallardón	956,865	42.7 (#1)	47 / 101	No
1995	Alberto Ruiz-Gallardón	1,476,442	51.0 (#1)	54 / 103	Yes
1999	Alberto Ruiz-Gallardón	1,324,596	51.1 (#1)	55 / 102	Yes
May 2003	Esperanza Aguirre	1,429,890	46.7 (#1)	55 / 111	—
Oct. 2003	Esperanza Aguirre	1,346,588	48.5 (#1)	57 / 111	Yes
2007	Esperanza Aguirre	1,592,162	53.3 (#1)	67 / 120	Yes
2011	Esperanza Aguirre	1,548,306	51.7 (#1)	72 / 129	Yes
2015	Cristina Cifuentes	1,050,256	33.1 (#1)	48 / 129	Yes
2019	Isabel Díaz Ayuso	719,852	22.2 (#2)	30 / 132	Yes
2021	Isabel Díaz Ayuso	1,631,608	44.8 (#1)	65 / 136	Yes
2023	Isabel Díaz Ayuso	1,599,186	47.3 (#1)	70 / 135	Yes

=== Cortes Generales ===
Cortes Generales
Election	Congress				Senate	
Election	Votes	%	Seats	+/–	Seats	+/–
1989	919,357	34.22 (#1)	12 / 33	1 (Note: Compared to AP–PDP–PL totals in the 1986 general election.)	3 / 4	2
1993	1,373,042	43.92 (#1)	16 / 34	4	3 / 4	0
1996	1,642,489	49.29 (#1)	17 / 34	1	3 / 4	0
2000	1,625,831	52.52 (#1)	19 / 34	2	3 / 4	0
2004	1,576,636	45.02 (#1)	17 / 35	2	3 / 4	0
2008	1,737,688	49.19 (#1)	18 / 35	1	3 / 4	0
2011	1,719,709	50.97 (#1)	19 / 36	1	3 / 4	0
2015	1,210,219	33.44 (#1)	13 / 36	6	3 / 4	0
2016	1,325,665	38.25 (#1)	15 / 36	2	3 / 4	0
Apr. 2019	705,119	18.64 (#3)	7 / 37	8	1 / 4	2
Nov. 2019	887,474	24.91 (#2)	10 / 37	3	2 / 4	1
2023	1,463,183	40.55 (#1)	16 / 37	6	3 / 4	1

=== European Parliament ===
European Parliament
Election	Votes	%
1989	593,239	27.98 (#2)
1994	1,209,999	50.27 (#1)
1999	1,278,583	49.34 (#1)
2004	1,088,712	49.54 (#1)
2009	1,112,670	48.58 (#1)
2014	665,244	29.98 (#1)
2019	715,871	22.15 (#2)
