= Argamasilla =

Argamasilla is the name of two different municipalities in the Province of Ciudad Real, Spain

- Argamasilla de Alba
- Argamasilla de Calatrava
