= Abellan =

Abellan or Abellán is a surname. Notable people with the surname include:

- Alejandro Abellan (born 1965), Canadian actor
- Carmen Conde Abellán (1907–1996), Spanish poet, writer and literary critic
- Cayetano Hilario Abellán (1916–1997), Spanish sculptor
- Joan Abellan i Mula (born 1946), Spanish playwright and writer
- José María Dols Abellán (1953–2014; maternal surname), Spanish bullfighter
