= Carmen López Ruiz =

Spanish trade unionist

Carmen López
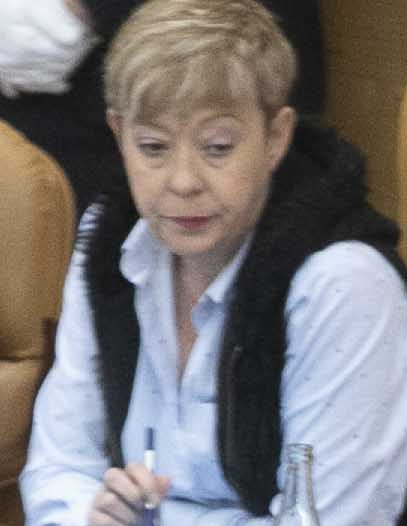
- Carmen López in May 2018

Member of the Assembly of Madrid
- Incumbent
- Assumed office 9 June 2015

Personal details
- Born: 15 December 1961 (age 63); Argamasilla de Calatrava
- Citizenship: Spanish
- Occupation: Trade unionist · politician · health staff

María del Carmen López Ruiz (born 1961) is a Spanish trade unionist and health staff, member of the Unión General de Trabajadores (UGT), and member of the 10th Assembly of Madrid.

== Biography ==
Born on 15 December 1961 in Argamasilla de Calatrava (province of Ciudad Real), she has worked as health staff at the Hospital Ramón y Cajal. He affiliated to the Unión General de Trabajadores (UGT) in 1984. Secretary for Social Policy in the Confederal Executive Commission of the UGT, she was included as candidate in the 6th position of the Spanish Socialist Workers' Party (PSOE) list for the 2015 regional election in the Community of Madrid, headed by Ángel Gabilondo. She was elected member of the 10th term of the regional parliament.

In the voting that took place on 9 Juny 2015 for the opening session of the new legislature she was elected 2nd Secretary of the Board of the Assembly.
