= Mónica Silvana González =

Spanish politician

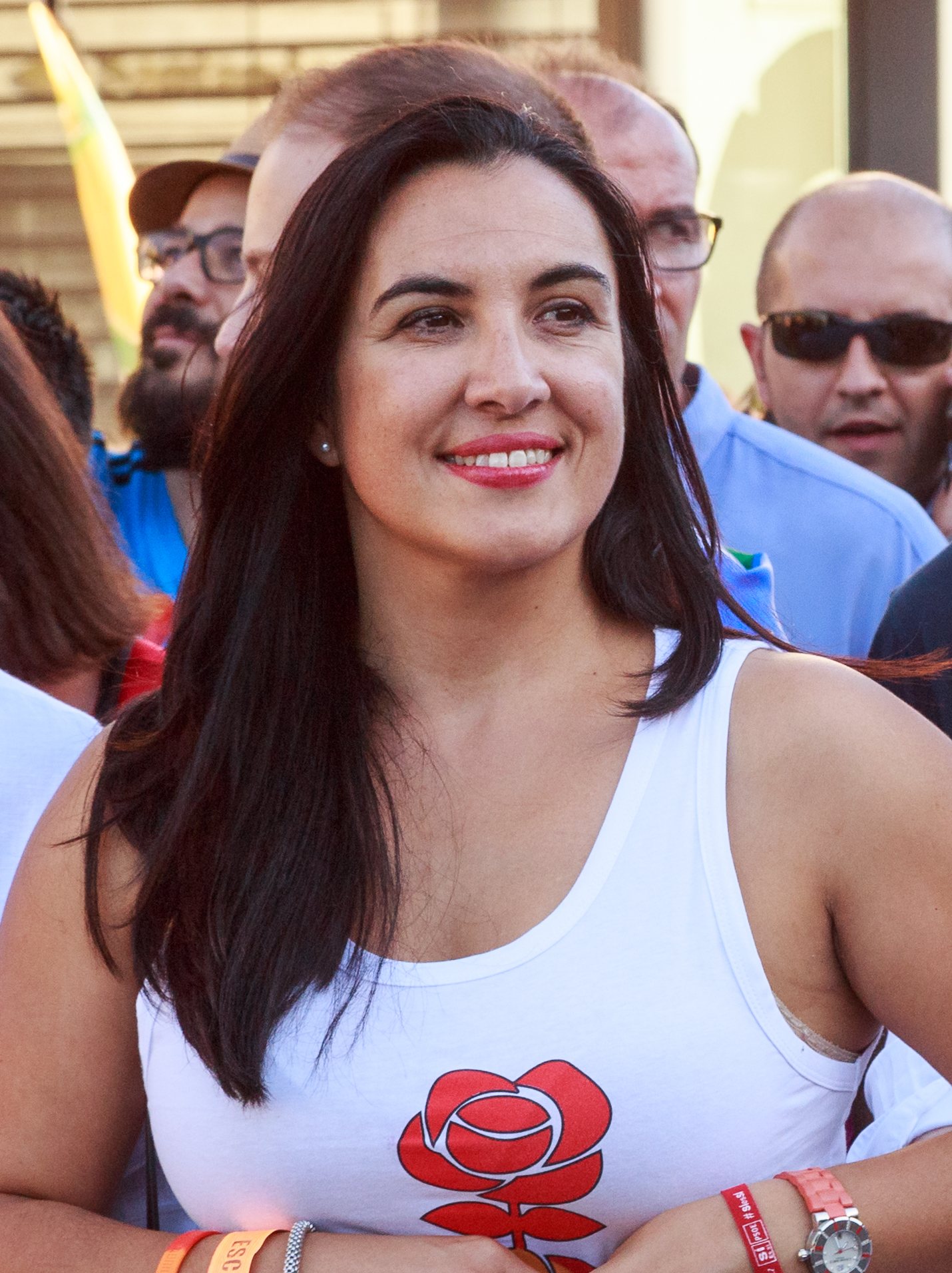
- During the WorldPride 2017

Member of the European Parliament for Spain
- Incumbent
- Assumed office 2019

Member of the Assembly of Madrid
- In office 9 June 2015 – 2019

Alcalá de Henares city councillor
- In office 2007–2015

Personal details
- Born: 12 February 1976 (age 49) Buenos Aires
- Citizenship: Argentine / Spanish
- Political party: PSOE
- Occupation: Politician

Mónica Silvana González González (pronounced [ˈmonika sil'βana ɣonˈsales]; born 12 February 1976) is an Argentine and Spanish politician who has been serving as Member of the European Parliament since 2019. She is a member of the Federal Executive Commission of the Spanish Socialist Workers' Party (PSOE) and previously served as member of the Assembly of Madrid.

== Early life and education ==
Born on 12 February 1976 in Buenos Aires, Argentina. At 4 years old, she moved to the city of Esquina (province of Corrientes). Graduated in Tourism at the National University of the Northeast of Corrientes, she moved to Spain in 1998, settling in Alcalá de Henares.

== Political career ==
A member of the local aggrupation of the Spanish Socialist Workers' Party (PSOE) in Alcalá de Henares, González was city councillor of the municipality from 2007 to 2015.

González ran as candidate in the PSOE list (10th position) for the May 2015 regional election in Madrid headed by Ángel Gabilondo, she became a member of the 10th term of the regional legislature.

In the context of the 39th Federal Congress of the PSOE that took place in June 2017, González was designated a member of the Federal Executive Commission in the role of Secretary in the Area of Diversity and Social Movements.

=== Member of the European Parliament, 2019–present ===
Since the 2019 European Parliament election, González has been serving on the Parliament’s Committee on Development. In this capacity, she served as the parliament's rapporteur on humanitarian aid from 2019 to 2023.

In addition to her committee assignments, González is a member of the European Parliament Intergroup on Disability, the European Parliament Intergroup on Fighting against Poverty, and the European Parliament Intergroup on LGBT Rights.

In January 2023, President of the European Parliament Roberta Metsola announced that González would lose her entitlement to a daily subsistence allowance (€338 a day) and parliamentary activity for 30 days for the 'psychological harassment' towards her three accredited parliamentary assistants.
