= Teresa Jiménez-Becerril =

Spanish politician, journalist and businesswomen

Teresa Jiménez-Becerril MP
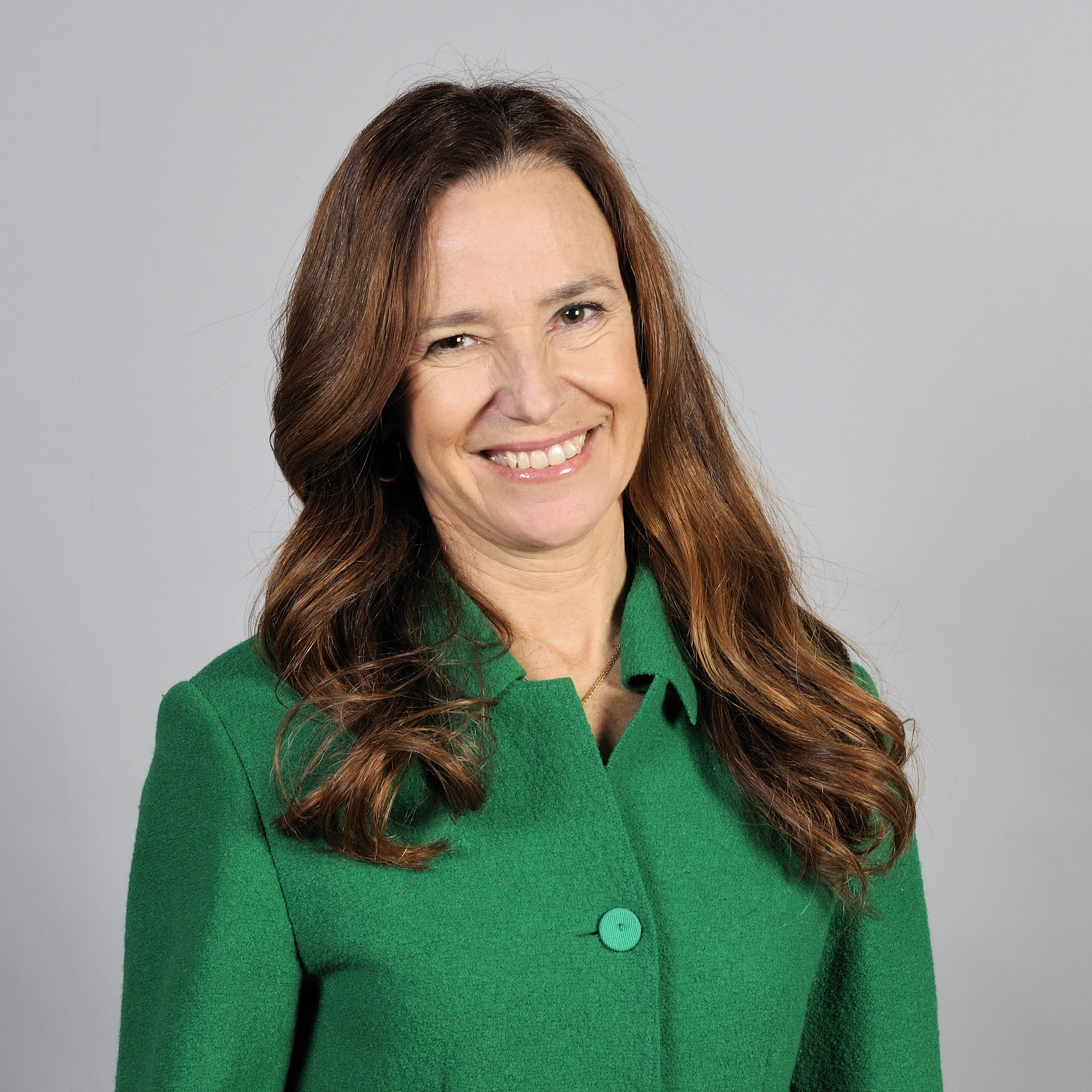

Acting Ombudsman of Spain
- Incumbent
- Assumed office 18 November 2026
- Monarch: Felipe VI
- Preceded by: Ángel Gabilondo

Member of the European Parliament

Personal details
- Born: Teresa Jiménez-Becerril; 24 July 1961 (age 65) Sevilla, Spain
- Party: Partido Popular; European People's Party

María Teresa Jiménez-Becerril Barrio (born 24 July 1961 at Seville) is a Spanish politician, journalist and businesswomen who served as a Member of the European Parliament from 2004 until 2014.

In 2002, Jiménez-Becerril became President of the Jiménez Becerril Foundation and in 2009, she was elected as a Member of the European Parliament representing the Partido Popular and was returned to Brussels in the 2014 European elections.

In early 2014, the Partido Popular chose Jiménez-Becerril to be the party list's number 3 for the 2014 European elections, following Miguel Arias Cañete and Esteban González Pons. Following the elections, she was elected chairwoman of the delegation to the EU-Mexico Joint Parliamentary Committee. In addition to her committee assignments, Jiménez-Becerril was a member of the European Parliament Intergroup on Disability.

In addition to her committee assignments, Jiménez-Becerril has been a substitute member of the Spanish delegation to the Parliamentary Assembly of the Council of Europe (PACE) since 2020, where she serves on the Committee on Legal Affairs and Human Rights and the Committee on Social Affairs, Health and Sustainable Development.

== Other activities ==
- Fundación Alberto Jiménez-Becerril contra el Terrorismo, President
