= Clara Serra =

Spanish politician (born 1982)

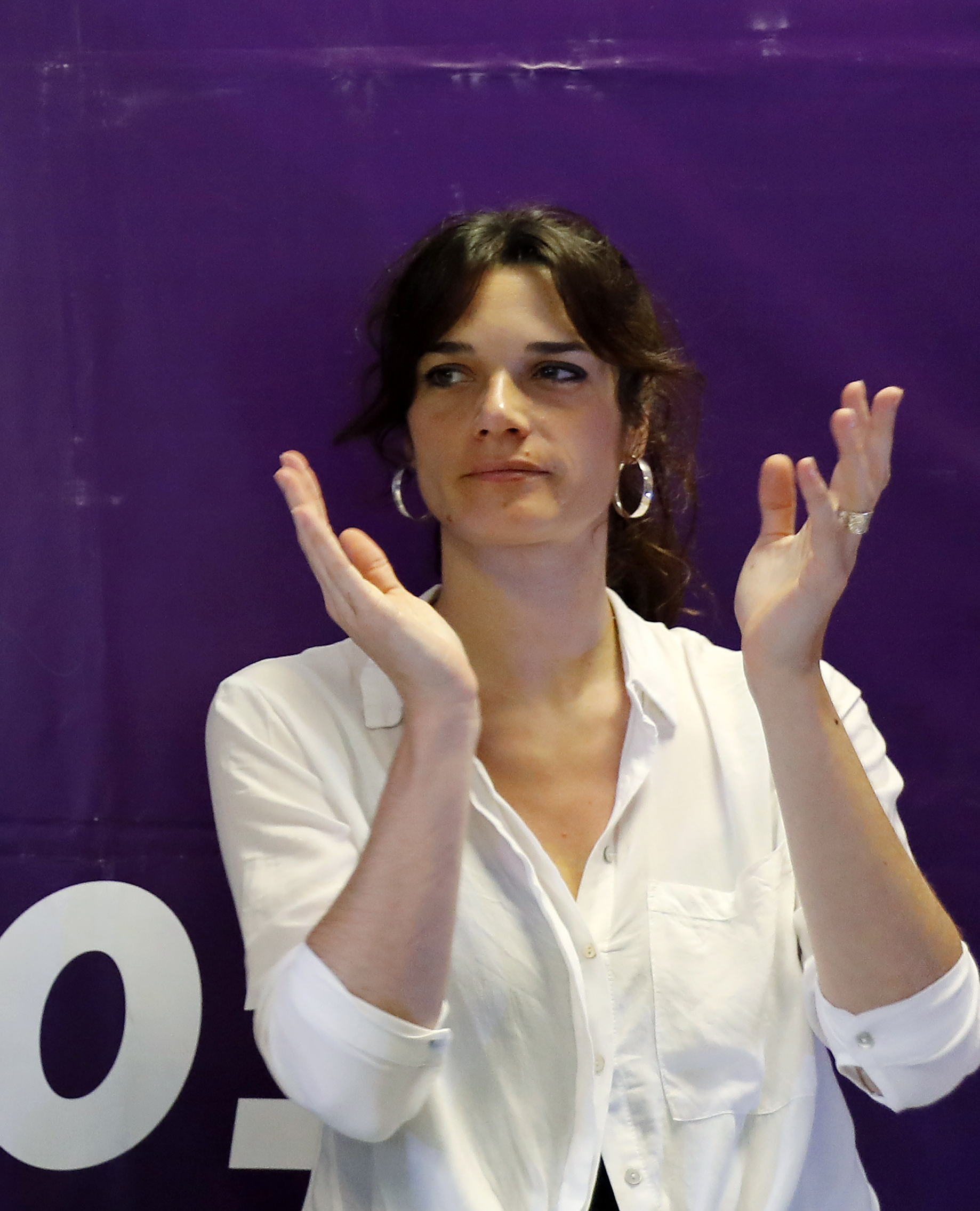
- Clara Serra in 2018

Member of the Assembly of Madrid
- In office 9 June 2015 – 7 October 2019

Personal details
- Born: 13 September 1982 (age 43) Madrid
- Citizenship: Spanish
- Party: Podemos
- Occupation: Politician, high school teacher, essayist, philosopher

Clara Irma Serra Sánchez (born 1982) is a Spanish politician and feminist author. She was a member of the Assembly of Madrid between 2015 and 2019, during the 10th and 11th terms of the regional legislature.

== Biography ==
Born on 13 September 1982 in Madrid. Her father, Fernando Serra, is a former leftist turned into a liberal and writer for Libertad Digital. She graduated in Philosophy at the Complutense University of Madrid (UCM). She worked as highschool philosophy teacher for six years. She entered politics with the creation of Podemos.

She ran as candidate of the Podemos list for the 2015 Madrilenian regional election, and became a member of the 10th term of the regional legislature. Her younger sister, Isabel, also became a member of the Assembly in the Podemos parliamentary group.

After the resignation of Lorena Ruiz-Huerta as Spokeswoman of the Podemos parliamentary group in the Assembly, Serra was elected within the members of the parliamentary group to replace Ruiz-Huerta.

Serra ran 2nd in the Más Madrid list for the May 2019 Madrilenian regional election, and renovated her seat at the regional legislature. Following the September 2019 presentation of the nationwide Más País project for the 10 November 2019 general election, she communicated her renouncement to her seat in the Assembly of Madrid on 7 October 2019 in disagreement with the way the platform was working, in addition to Más País intending to run against En Comú Podem in Barcelona, which Serra was opposed to.

== Works ==
- — (2018). Leonas y zorras. Estrategias políticas feministas. Catarata.
- — (2019). Manual ultravioleta. Feminismo para mirar el mundo. Ediciones B.
- — (2024). El sentido de consentir. Anagrama.
