= Ana García D'Atri =

Spanish editor, journalist and politician

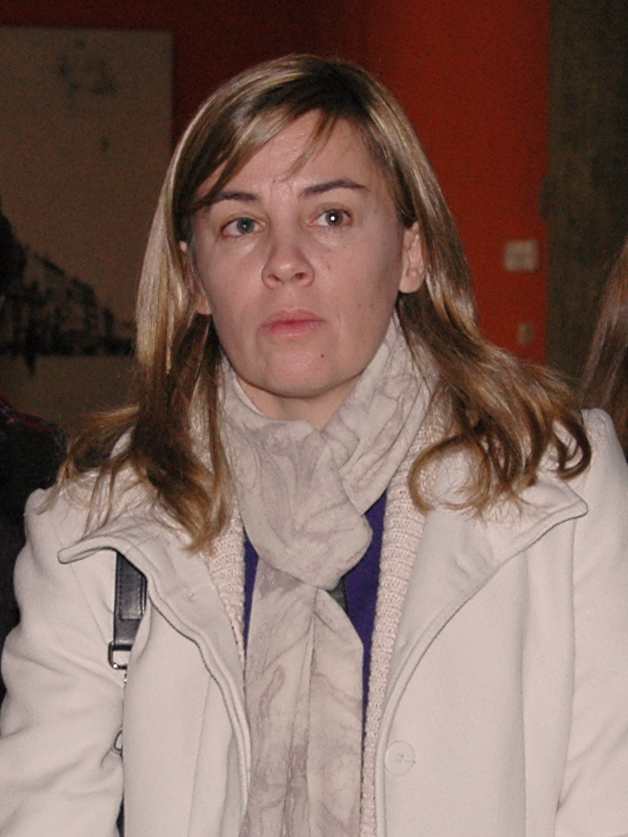
- In November 2012

Member of the Assembly of Madrid
- In office 9 June 2015 – 30 December 2016

Madrid City Councillor
- In office 11 June 2011 – 13 June 2015

Personal details
- Born: 28 October 1967 (age 59) Madrid
- Citizenship: Spanish
- Occupation: Editor, journalist, politician

Ana García D'Atri (born 1967) is a Spanish editor, journalist and politician.

== Biography ==
Born in Madrid on 28 October 1967, she graduated in Sciences of the Information (Journalism) at the Complutense University of Madrid (UCM). She worked as journalist for OTR/Press, Colpisa, La Gaceta de los Negocios and La Voz de Almería. In 1995 she started to work as editor at Ediciones B and Planeta.

She entered politics in 2011, as she ran in the Spanish Socialist Workers' Party (PSOE) list led by Jaime Lissavetzky for the May 2011 municipal election in Madrid. She was elected city councillor and became the Spokeswoman of Arts, Tourism and Sports of the Socialist Municipal Group at the Ayuntamiento de Madrid during the 2011–2015 term.

She was included in the PSOE list for the 2015 Madrilenian regional election and became a member of the 10th term of the regional legislature, in which she served as Spokeswoman of the Socialist Parliamentary Group at the Commission of Culture. In May 2016 she was tentatively included by Pedro Sánchez as a member of his "Committee of Wise Men" (a sort of informal shadow cabinet) in the field of Culture.

She resigned to her seat at the Assembly of Madrid on 30 December 2016, as she intended to return to her professional activity as editor.
