= Francisco Fernández Marugán =

Spanish economist and politician (1946–2025)

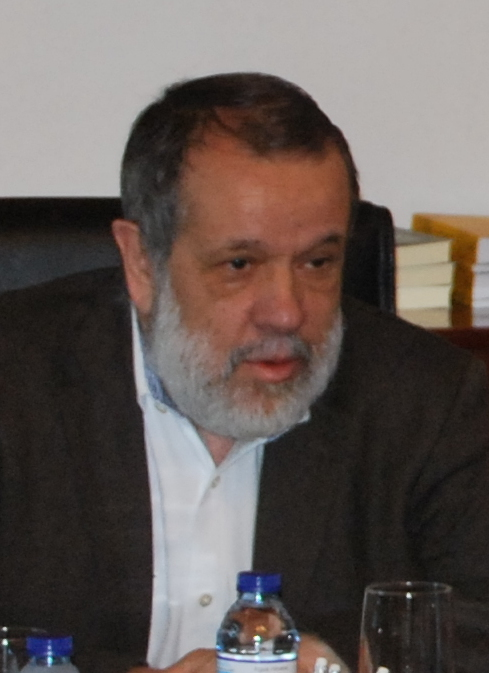
- Fernández in 2013

Acting Ombudsman of Spain
- In office 20 July 2017 – 18 November 2021
- Monarch: Felipe VI
- Preceded by: Soledad Becerril
- Succeeded by: Ángel Gabilondo

Personal details
- Born: 6 October 1946 Cáceres, Spain
- Died: 30 December 2025 (aged 79) Madrid, Spain
- Party: Spanish Socialist Workers' Party

Francisco Fernández Marugán (6 October 1946 – 30 December 2025) was a Spanish economist and politician for the Spanish Socialist Workers' Party (PSOE) and a long serving member of the Congress of Deputies. He was the acting Ombudsman of Spain between 2017 and 2021.

== Career ==
Fernández entered national politics at the 1982 General Election when he was elected to the Spanish Congress of Deputies representing Seville Province. He changed districts for the 1986 election, returning to his native region of Extremadura and was elected for Badajoz Province being re-elected in all subsequent General elections in 1989, 1993, 1996, 2000, 2004 and 2008.

Fernández was usually identified with the "Guerrista" sector of the PSOE (which takes its name from the veteran deputy Alfonso Guerra) and in a 2005 article supported Guerra in criticising the actions of the PSOE such as entering into a tripartite Government in Catalonia.

He was also considered a close associate of former president of Extremadura Juan Carlos Rodríguez Ibarra, also identified with the Guerrista sector. Within the PSOE he served as Secretary for Economic issues and he coordinated the PSOE campaigns for both the 1986 and 1993 General Elections.

Following the narrow PSOE victory at the 1993 election he served as Secretary of State for Economic and Social issues in the last PSOE government of Felipe González which lasted until the 1996 election.

In 1999 Fernández became involved in a shouting match with the Partido Popular minister Josep Piqué in the Spanish Congress chamber which ended with Piqué calling Fernández an "hijo de puta" (son of a bitch).

In June 2012 he was appointed First Deputy Ombudsman and, from 21 July 2017 to 18 November 2021, he served as acting Ombudsman of Spain.

== Personal life and death ==
Fernández Marugán was married with two children. He died in Madrid on 30 December 2025 at the age of 79.
