= Lorena Ruiz-Huerta =

Spanish politician

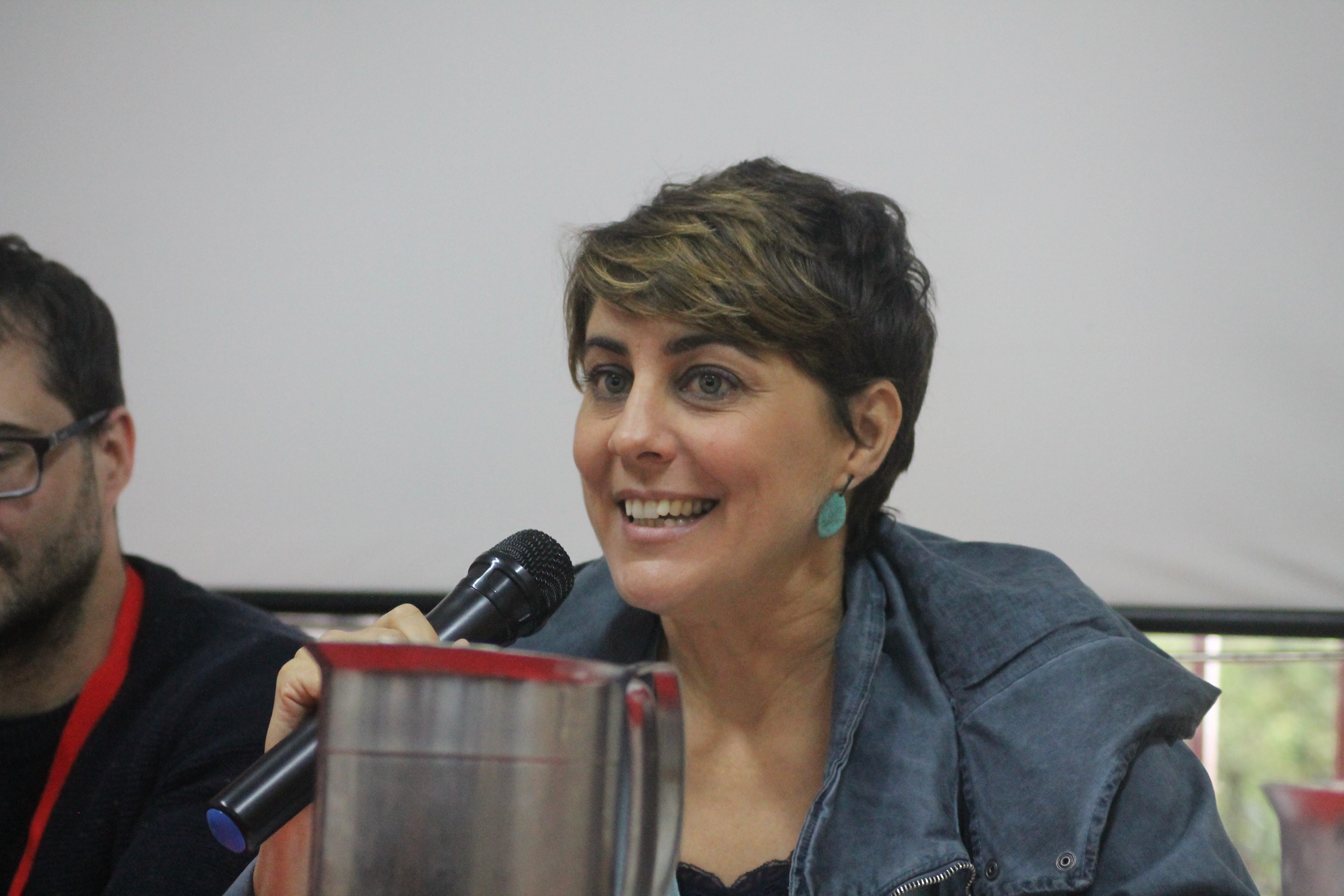
- In June 2018

Member of the Assembly of Madrid
- In office 9 June 2015 – 8 October 2018

Personal details
- Born: 9 February 1977 (age 49) Madrid
- Citizenship: Spanish
- Party: Podemos
- Occupation: Lawyer, politician

Lorena Ruiz-Huerta García de Viedma (born 1977) is a Spanish lawyer and politician. She was a member of the 10th Assembly of Madrid in the Podemos parliamentary group.

== Early life ==
Born on 9 February 1977 in Madrid. Her uncle Alejandro Ruiz-Huerta, a lawyer, was a survivor from the 1977 Atocha massacre; this would later influence Lorena's professional vocation.

She graduated in law at the Charles III University of Madrid and later obtained a certification in advanced studies in Public Law. She started her career as lawyer specialized in Family and Criminal Law in 2005.

== Regional MP ==
She ran as candidate in the Podemos list (in second place) for the May 2015 regional election in Madrid, and she was elected member of the regional legislature.

In December 2016, after the Ramón Espinar's victory in the Podemos regional primary election in November 2016, the party spokesperson in the Assembly José Manuel López (considered a member of the errejonista faction), was forced to resign. Ruiz-Huerta, a member of the minor anticapitalista faction of the party, was appointed as López's replacement after Espinar (himself a member of the mainstream pablista faction) struck an agreement with the anticapitalistas.

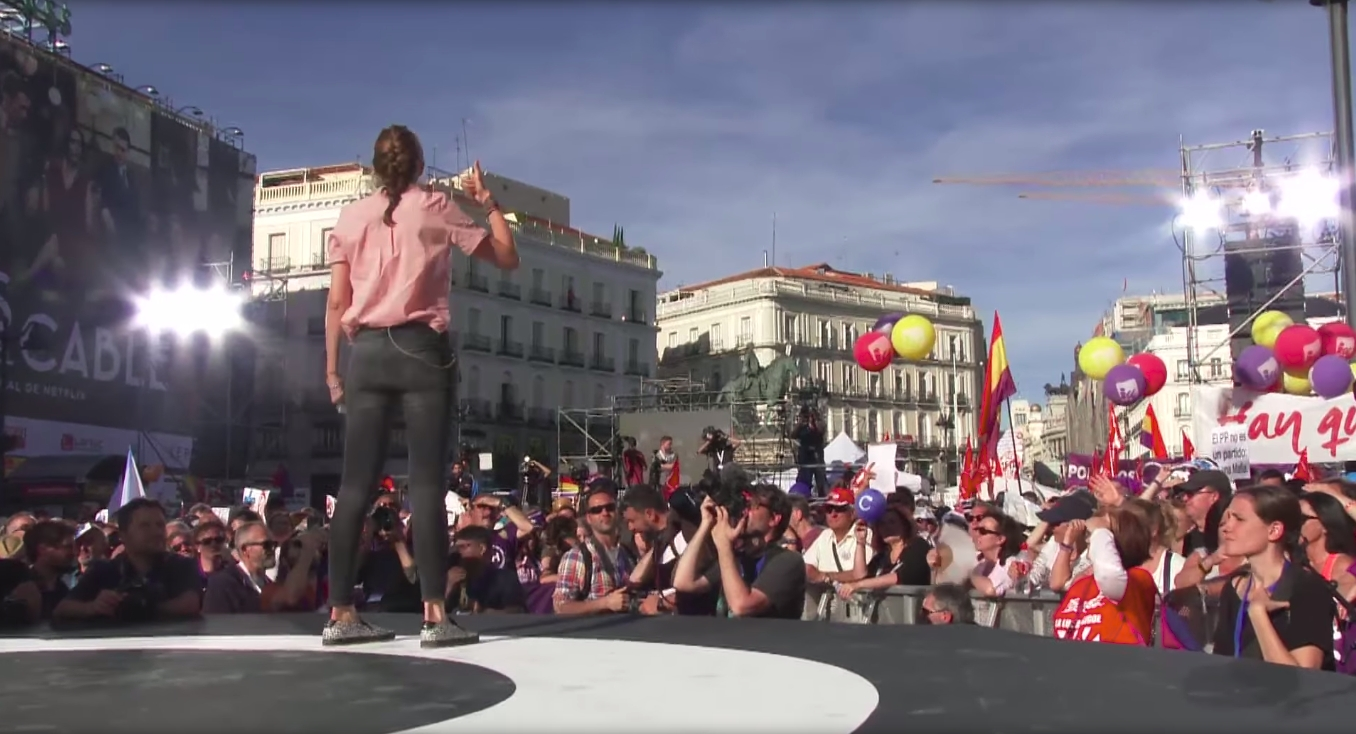
Addressing the crowd during a Podemos event in the Puerta del Sol, in May 2017.

When the Podemos parliamentary group filed a motion of no-confidence on Cristina Cifuentes in 2017, Ruiz-Huerta was presented as the candidate to replace Cifuentes. The motion failed to gain enough parliamentary support in June 2017, receiving only the support from the 27 legislators of her parliamentary group. The 47 members of the PSOE group abstained, while the members of the Citizens and the People's Party groups voted against in bloc (with the exception of Elena González-Moñux, on sick leave due to depression), numbering 64 votes against.

She handed in her resignation as spokeswoman of the Podemos parliamentary group (and also her parliamentary seat) in October 2018. She explained her decision in a letter, where she criticised the direction her party was taking. She also announced the intention to retake her activity as lawyer. She was replaced as spokeswoman by Clara Serra and her vacant seat at the Assembly was taken by María Acín, both errejonistas.
