= 2015 Madrilenian regional election =

Election in the Spanish region of Madrid

- 24 May 2015

All 129 seats in the Assembly of Madrid 65 seats needed for a majority
- Opinion polls
- Registered: 4,880,495 ▲5.6%
- Turnout: 3,205,931 (65.7%) ▼0.2 pp
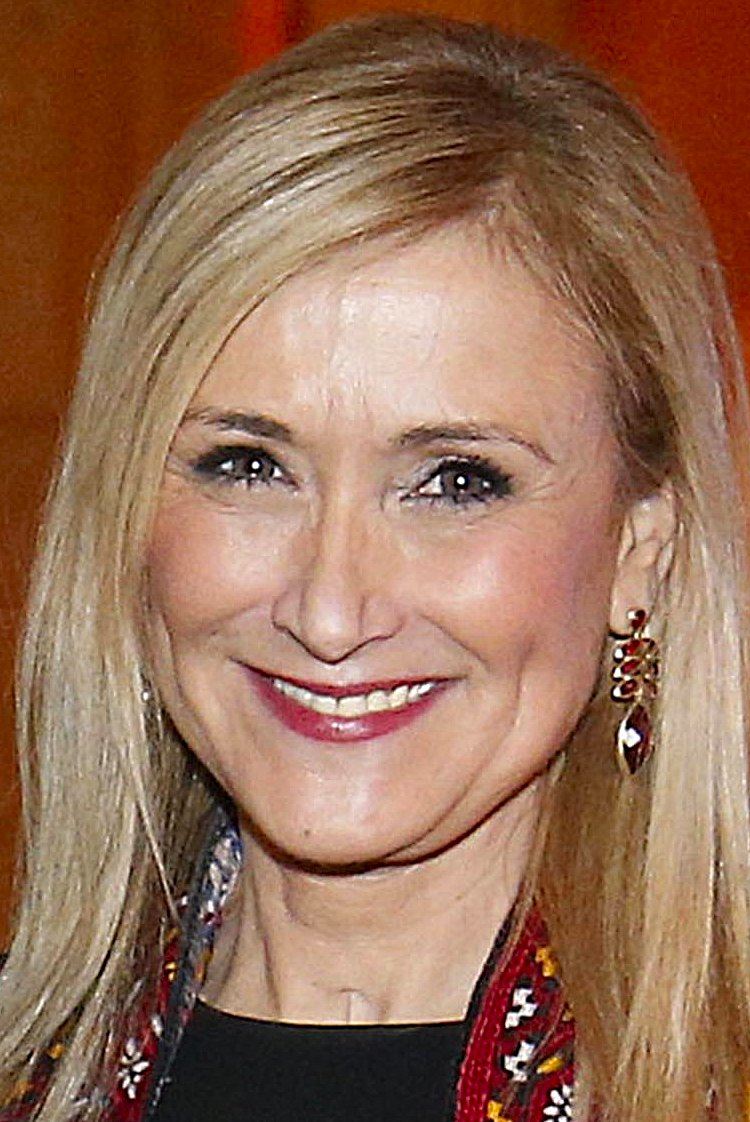

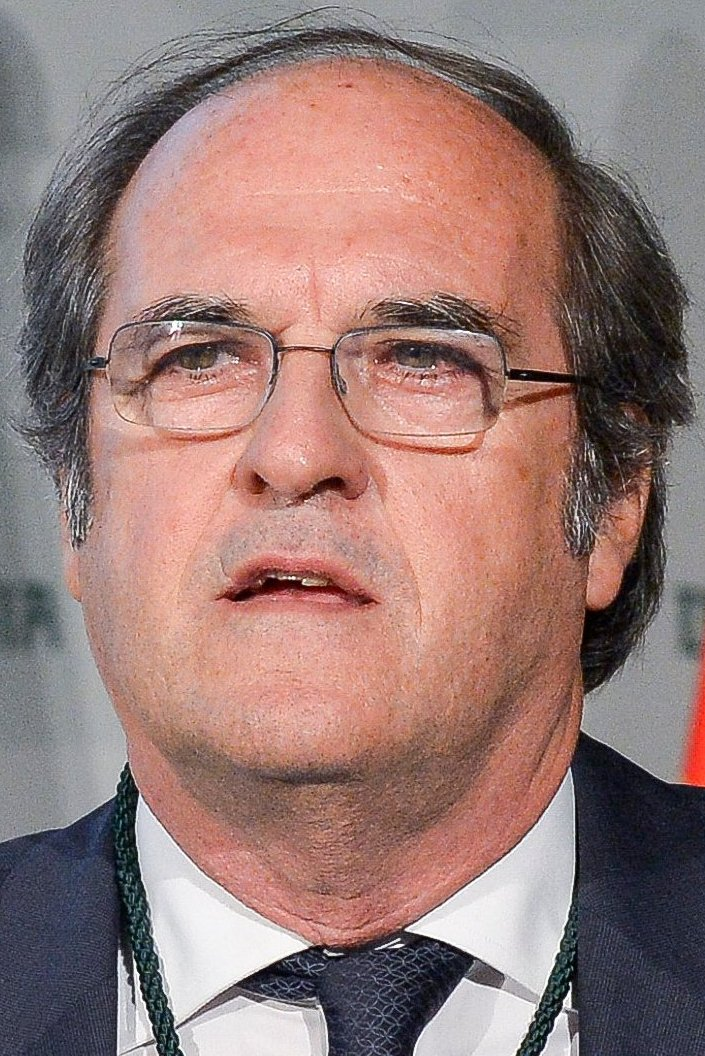

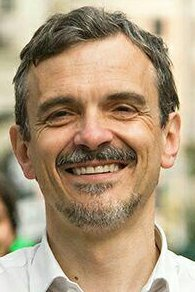

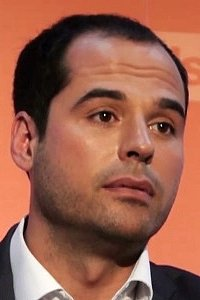

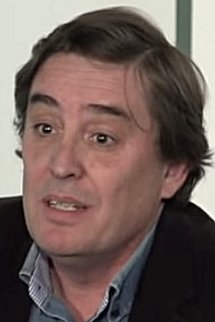

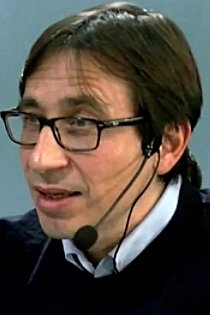
	First party	Second party	Third party
Leader	Cristina Cifuentes	Ángel Gabilondo	José Manuel López
Party	PP	PSOE	Podemos
Leader since	6 March 2015	21 February 2015	1 April 2015
Last election	72 seats, 51.7%	36 seats, 26.3%	Did not contest
Seats won	48	37	27
Seat change	▼24	▲1	▲27
Popular vote	1,050,256	807,385	591,697
Percentage	33.1%	25.4%	18.6%
Swing	▼18.6 pp	▼0.9 pp	New party
	Fourth party	Fifth party	Sixth party
Leader	Ignacio Aguado	Luis García Montero	Ramón Marcos
Party	C's	IUCM–LV	UPyD
Leader since	2 March 2015	27 February 2015	18 October 2014
Last election	0 seats, 0.2%	13 seats, 9.6%	8 seats, 6.3%
Seats won	17	0	0
Seat change	▲17	▼13	▼8
Popular vote	385,836	132,207	64,643
Percentage	12.2%	4.2%	2.0%
Swing	▲12.0 pp	▼5.4 pp	▼4.3 pp
President before election
Ignacio González
PP
President after election
Cristina Cifuentes
PP

A regional election was held in the Community of Madrid on 24 May 2015 to elect the 10th Assembly of the autonomous community. All 129 seats in the Assembly were up for election. It was held concurrently with regional elections in twelve other autonomous communities and local elections all across Spain.

The ruling People's Party (PP) emerged once again as the largest political force in the region, but it saw a substantial drop in its vote support and the loss of the absolute majority it had held almost uninterruptedly since 1995—with a brief interlude in 2003—. However, as both the Spanish Socialist Workers' Party (PSOE) and newcomer Podemos fell one seat short of an absolute majority, it meant that the PP could remain in government through an agreement with liberal Citizens (C's). As a result, Cristina Cifuentes became the new President of the Community of Madrid, forming a minority government with C's providing confidence and supply. Cifuentes would be the third regional President in three years, after Esperanza Aguirre's resignation in 2012 and incumbent president Ignacio González not running for the office as a result of several scandals.

The strong performance of both Podemos and C's was at the expense of left-wing United Left (IU)—which lost its parliamentary representation for the first time in history as a result of not reaching the required 5% threshold—and Union, Progress and Democracy (UPyD), whose parliamentary presence was ephemeral having only entered the regional parliament in 2011.

== Background ==
After the 2011 regional election, the People's Party (PP) was re-elected to a fourth consecutive term in office with an absolute majority of seats, with the Spanish Socialist Workers' Party (PSOE) under Tomás Gómez obtaining the worst result of its history in the region up until that point. On 17 September 2012, President Esperanza Aguirre, who had renewed the office for a third term, resigned allegedly a result of health issues but also for "personal reasons", being succeeded in the presidency by her deputy, Ignacio González.

Opinion polls from 2012 predicted a drop in vote support for the PP, to the point that it could lose the absolute majority it had enjoyed almost uninterruptedly since 1995. The same polls had shown that the PSOE remained unable to capitalize on the PP government's electoral wear. On the 2014 European Parliament election, both parties obtained historic lows in the region: with 29.9%, the PP result was its lowest since 1989, while the PSOE's result at 18.9% was the party's lowest score ever. A newly created party, Podemos, was able to poll at 11.3%, placing itself as the third political force of the community and within striking distance of the PSOE. Podemos's growth in opinion polls since mid-to-late 2014 at the expense of the PSOE's vote inspired fears within the party that it could be displaced to third place both regionally and nationally.

== Overview ==
Under the 1983 Statute of Autonomy, the Assembly of Madrid was the unicameral legislature of the homonymous autonomous community, having legislative power in devolved matters, as well as the ability to grant or withdraw confidence from a regional president. The electoral and procedural rules were supplemented by national law provisions.

=== Date ===
The term of the Assembly of Madrid expired four years after the date of its previous ordinary election, with election day being fixed for the fourth Sunday of May every four years. The election decree was required to be issued no later than 54 days before the scheduled election date and published on the following day in the Official Gazette of the Community of Madrid (BOCM). The previous election was held on 22 May 2011, setting the date for election day on the fourth Sunday of May four years later, which was 24 May 2015.

The regional president had the prerogative to dissolve the Assembly of Madrid at any given time and call a snap election, provided that no motion of no confidence was in process, no nationwide election had been called and that dissolution did not occur either during the first legislative session or during the last year of parliament before its planned expiration, nor before one year after a previous one. In the event of an investiture process failing to elect a regional president within a two-month period from the first ballot, the Assembly was to be automatically dissolved and a fresh election called, which was to be held on the first Sunday 54 days after the call. Any snap election held as a result of these circumstances did not alter the date of the chamber's next ordinary election, with elected lawmakers serving the remainder of its original four-year term.

The election to the Assembly of Madrid was officially called on 31 March 2015 with the publication of the corresponding decree in the BOCM, setting election day for 24 May and scheduling for the chamber to reconvene on 9 June.

=== Electoral system ===
Voting for the Assembly was based on universal suffrage, comprising all Spanish nationals over 18 years of age, registered in the Community of Madrid and with full political rights, provided that they had not been deprived of the right to vote by a final sentence, nor were legally incapacitated. Additionally, non-resident citizens were required to apply for voting, a system known as "begged" voting (Spanish: Voto rogado).

The Assembly of Madrid had one seat per 50,000 inhabitants or fraction above 25,000. All were elected in a single multi-member constituency—corresponding to the autonomous community's territory—using the D'Hondt method and closed-list proportional voting, with a five percent-threshold of valid votes (including blank ballots) regionally. As a result of the aforementioned allocation, the Assembly was entitled to 129 seats, based on the official population figures resulting from the latest revision of the municipal register (as of 1 January 2014).

The law did not provide for by-elections to fill vacant seats; instead, any vacancies arising after the proclamation of candidates and during the legislative term were filled by the next candidates on the party lists or, when required, by designated substitutes.

=== Outgoing parliament ===
The table below shows the composition of the parliamentary groups in the chamber at the time of the election call.

Parliamentary composition in March 2015
Groups	Parties	Legislators	
Groups	Parties	Seats	Total
People's Parliamentary Group	PP	71	71
Socialist Parliamentary Group	PSOE	36	36
United Left–The Greens Parliamentary Group	IUCM	13	13
UPyD Parliamentary Group	UPyD	8	8
Non-Inscrits	INDEP	1 (Note: Teresa Gómez-Limón, former PP legislator.)	1

== Parties and candidates ==
The electoral law allowed for parties and federations registered in the interior ministry, alliances and groupings of electors to present lists of candidates. Parties and federations intending to form an alliance were required to inform the relevant electoral commission within 10 days of the election call, whereas groupings of electors needed to secure the signature of at least 0.5 percent of the electorate in the Community of Madrid, disallowing electors from signing for more than one list. Additionally, a balanced composition of men and women was required in the electoral lists, so that candidates of either sex made up at least 40 percent of the total composition.

Below is a list of the main parties and alliances which contested the election:

Candidacy	Parties and alliances	Leading candidate	Ideology	Previous result		Gov.	Ref.
Candidacy	Parties and alliances	Leading candidate	Ideology	Vote %	Seats	Gov.	Ref.
PP	List: People's Party (PP)	Cristina Cifuentes	Conservatism; Christian democracy	51.7%	72	Yes	
PSOE	List: Spanish Socialist Workers' Party (PSOE)	Ángel Gabilondo	Social democracy	26.3%	36	No	
IUCM–LV	List: United Left of the Community of Madrid (IUCM) – Communist Party of Madrid (PCM) – The Dawn Marxist Organization (La Aurora (OM)) – Republican Left (IR) – Open Left (IzAb); The Greens (LV)	Luis García Montero	Socialism; Communism	9.6%	13	No	
UPyD	List: Union, Progress and Democracy (UPyD)	Ramón Marcos	Social liberalism Radical centrism	6.3%	8	No	
C's	List: Citizens–Party of the Citizenry (C's)	Ignacio Aguado	Liberalism	0.2%	0	No	
Podemos	List: We Can (Podemos); Equo (Equo)	José Manuel López	Left-wing populism Direct democracy Democratic socialism	Did not contest		No	

On 11 February 2015, PSOE secretary-general Pedro Sánchez removed Tomás Gómez, PSOE candidate for the 2015 regional election, from the party's regional leadership. The decision came, allegedly, after suspicions of Gómez being involved in a tram project corruption scandal during his time as Mayor of Parla, though electoral motives may have helped hasten the move, as Gómez was deemed a bad candidate as Rafael Simancas later recognized. Ángel Gabilondo, former Education minister in José Luis Rodríguez Zapatero's cabinet from 2009 to 2011, was selected as PSOE's leading candidate in the region replacing Gómez on 21 February 2015.

In United Left (IU), Tania Sánchez, elected as party's candidate in a primary election held on 1 December 2014, had left the party on 4 February 2015 alongside a number of supporters over an internal conflict with the party's regional leadership, involved in the Caja Madrid "black" credit cards scandal. Luis García Montero, a Spanish poet and literary critic, was selected to replace Sánchez' as IU candidate to the Community of Madrid.

The PP had not yet proclaimed a candidate as of February 2015, despite incumbent President Ignacio González being widely presumed to stand for a second term in office. On 2 March 2015, Spanish newspaper El Mundo pointed out that González had asked National Police officers to withhold information over an ongoing investigation on him about a possible tax fraud in the purchase of a luxury penthouse. González announced that he was the victim of policial "blackmail" and reiterated his wish to be his party's candidate for the 2015 election. However, rumours arose in the media that the party's leadership had withdrawn their support from González and expected him to eventually give up on his intention to run. Finally, on 6 March 2015, incumbent Government delegate in Madrid Cristina Cifuentes was chosen as PP candidate for the autonomous community, while former regional president Esperanza Aguirre was nominated as candidate to the City Council of Madrid.

== Campaign ==
=== Debates ===
2015 Madrilenian regional election debates
Date	Organizer(s)	Moderator(s)	P Present (Note: Denotes a main invitee attending the event.)							
Date	Organizer(s)	Moderator(s)	PP	PSOE	IUCM–LV	UPyD	C's	Podemos	Audience	Ref.
11 May	Telemadrid	Ana Samboal	P Cifuentes	P Gabilondo	P G. Montero	P Marcos	P Aguado	P López	4.9% (124,000)	

== Opinion polls ==
The tables below list opinion polling results in reverse chronological order, showing the most recent first and using the dates when the survey fieldwork was done, as opposed to the date of publication. Where the fieldwork dates are unknown, the date of publication is given instead. The highest percentage figure in each polling survey is displayed with its background shaded in the leading party's colour. If a tie ensues, this is applied to the figures with the highest percentages. The "Lead" column on the right shows the percentage-point difference between the parties with the highest percentages in a poll.

=== Graphical summary ===
Local regression trend line of poll results from 22 May 2011 to 24 May 2015, with each line corresponding to a political party.

=== Voting intention estimates ===
The table below lists weighted voting intention estimates. Refusals are generally excluded from the party vote percentages, while question wording and the treatment of "don't know" responses and those not intending to vote may vary between polling organisations. When available, seat projections determined by the polling organisations are displayed below (or in place of) the percentages in a smaller font; 65 seats were required for an absolute majority in the Assembly of Madrid.

Color key:

Poll conducted after legal ban on opinion polls Exit poll

Polling firm/Commissioner	Fieldwork date	Sample size	Turnout	PP	PSOE	IUCM–LV	UPyD	Equo–Ecolo	C's	Podemos	Lead
2015 regional election	24 May 2015	—N/a	65.7	33.1; 48	25.4; 37	4.2; 0	2.0; 0	–	12.2; 17	18.6; 27	7.7
TNS Demoscopia/RTVE–FORTA	24 May 2015	?	?	30.8; 43/46	24.4; 33/36	4.7; 0/6	0.9; 0	–	12.0; 16/18	22.3; 30/33	6.4
GAD3/Antena 3	11–22 May 2015	?	?	? 45/47	? 29/32	? 7/8	–	–	? 19/20	? 25/26	?
GAD3/ABC	17 May 2015	?	?	32.8; 45/47	22.9; 31/33	4.5; 0/6	0.7; 0	–	17.6; 24/25	16.8; 23/24	9.9
NC Report/La Razón	17 May 2015	400	?	35.4; 47/48	20.7; 27/28	5.9; 7/8	1.4; 0	–	18.9; 25/26	15.7; 21/22	14.7
Sigma Dos/El Mundo	11–14 May 2015	1,200	?	34.3; 46/47	20.4; 27	5.2; 6/7	–	–	17.6; 23/24	19.2; 25/26	13.9
Encuestamos	1–12 May 2015	?	?	29.1; 39/42	27.0; 35/38	5.4; 0/6	1.1; 0	–	15.2; 20/23	17.9; 24/26	2.1
Sigma Dos/Mediaset	4–7 May 2015	1,800	?	35.1; 48/49	19.7; 26/27	5.1; 6/7	–	–	17.5; 23/24	17.9; 24	15.4
MyWord/Cadena SER	29 Apr–6 May 2015	801	?	31.8; 44/48	19.9; 27/30	4.8; 0/6	2.1; 0	–	17.5; 24/26	19.4; 27/29	11.9
InvyMark/laSexta	27–30 Apr 2015	?	?	33.7; 48	22.6; 32	4.1; 0	1.4; 0	–	16.1; 23	18.6; 26	11.1
Metroscopia/El País	27–28 Apr 2015	1,200	72	27.2; 36	21.6; 29	5.5; 7	–	–	21.4; 29	20.7; 28	5.6
Idea Nomina Data/Público	15–25 Apr 2015	2,065	?	29.0– 32.0; 39/43	17.0– 20.0; 25/28	3.0– 5.0; 0	0.5– 2.5; 0	–	20.0– 23.0; 29/31	20.0– 23.0; 29/31	9.0
Cámara de Comercio	23 Apr 2015	?	?	? 39	? 30	? 8	–	–	? 24	? 28	?
Deimos Estadística	16–23 Apr 2015	1,210	68.4	36.6; 53/54	21.2; 29/30	4.3; 0	2.0; 0	–	17.2; 23/24	15.6; 22/23	15.4
GAD3/ABC	13–20 Apr 2015	1,008	?	32.1; 44/46	23.3; 32/33	4.7; 0/6	0.9; 0	–	17.9; 24/26	16.9; 23/24	8.8
CIS	23 Mar–19 Apr 2015	1,512	?	34.7; 48/49	20.0; 27/28	5.4; 7	2.5; 0	–	16.3; 22/23	17.3; 24	14.7
Sigma Dos/Mediaset	14–16 Apr 2015	1,800	?	34.6; 46/48	19.4; 26	5.9; 7/8	1.0; 0	–	17.2; 23	19.1; 25/26	15.2
Sigma Dos/El Mundo	25–26 Mar 2015	1,200	?	32.8; 44/45	20.7; 28	6.5; 8/9	1.8; 0	–	16.6; 22/23	19.2; 25/26	12.1
NC Report/La Razón	2–12 Mar 2015	400	?	36.1; 48/49	21.4; 28/29	5.8; 9/10	1.8; 0	–	17.7; 23/24	15.4; 20/21	14.7
Metroscopia/El País	19–20 Feb 2015	1,200	73	28.0; 38	17.0; 23	5.5; 7	5.0; 6	–	15.8; 21	24.6; 34	3.4
PP	18 Feb 2015	?	? (Note: Cristina Cifuentes as PP candidate hypothesis.)	? 63	? 24	–	–	–	? 8	? 34	?
PP	18 Feb 2015	?	? (Note: Ignacio González as PP candidate hypothesis.)	? 59	? 26	–	–	–	? 9	? 35	?
InvyMark/laSexta	12–13 Feb 2015	1,600	?	38.8; 59	17.3; 26	4.5; 0	4.6; 0	–	6.0; 9	23.6; 35	15.2
Metroscopia/El País	11 Feb 2015	800	?	27.5; 37	23.7; 32	6.0; 8	5.4; 7	–	15.4; 20	18.5; 25	3.8
PP	4 Feb 2015	?	?	? 55	? 19	? 5	? 0	–	? 12	? 38	?
PP	4 Feb 2015	?	?	? 51/53	? 23/25	? 7	? 7	–	? 7	? 30/32	?
Metroscopia/El País	26 Jan 2015	?	?	23.8; 33	19.4; 27	7.9; 11	6.9; 9	–	10.5; 14	25.2; 35	1.4
Metroscopia/El País	24 Nov 2014	?	?	28.0; 39	19.7; 27	8.3; 11	9.4; 13	–	–	28.6; 39	0.6
Llorente & Cuenca	31 Oct 2014	?	?	? 51/55	? 24/27	? 10/14	? 11/14	–	–	? 25/30	?
GAD3/ABC	5–11 Sep 2014	1,000	71.0	41.8; 61	16.4; 24	5.4; 8	7.7; 11	1.0; 0	4.4; 0	17.5; 25	24.3
Metroscopia/El País	8 Sep 2014	?	?	35.7; 50	20.6; 28	8.7; 12	8.7; 12	–	–	19.9; 27	15.1
2014 EP election	25 May 2014	—N/a	46.5	30.0 (48)	19.0 (30)	10.6 (16)	10.6 (17)	2.0 (0)	4.8 (0)	11.4 (18)	11.0
Metroscopia/El País	24–28 Apr 2014	1,200	60	36.7; 53	21.3; 31	18.8; 27	12.7; 18	–	–	–	15.4
InvyMark/laSexta	21–25 Apr 2014	?	?	42.3; 60	23.9; 34	14.4; 20	10.5; 15	–	–	–	18.4
La Vanguardia	30 Mar 2014	?	?	37.2; 54	24.3; 35	15.8; 22	12.4; 18	–	–	–	12.9
NC Report/La Razón (Note: "El PP ganaría de nuevo en 9 de 13 autonomías". La Razón (in Spanish). 18 November 2013. Archived from the original on 3 March 2016.)	15 Oct–12 Nov 2013	?	?	37.9; 52/53	23.4; 33/34	17.7; 24/25	13.4; 18/19	–	–	–	14.5
NC Report/La Razón	15 Apr–10 May 2013	350	?	39.4; 56/57	22.3; 31/32	? 24/25	? 16/17	–	–	–	17.1
Metroscopia/El País	29 Apr 2013	600	58	35.2; 54	20.1; 30	18.9; 29	10.4; 16	–	–	–	15.1
2011 general election	20 Nov 2011	—N/a	73.3	51.0 (69)	26.0 (35)	8.0 (11)	10.3 (14)	1.9 (0)	–	–	25.0
2011 regional election	22 May 2011	—N/a	65.9	51.7; 72	26.3; 36	9.6; 13	6.3; 8	1.0; 0	0.2; 0	–	25.4

=== Voting preferences ===
The table below lists raw, unweighted voting preferences.

Polling firm/Commissioner	Fieldwork date	Sample size	PP	PSOE	IUCM–LV	UPyD	C's	Podemos	Question	X mark	Lead
2015 regional election (Note: Does not include non-resident citizens.)	24 May 2015	—N/a	22.6	17.4	2.8	1.4	8.3	12.7	—N/a	31.1	5.2
MyWord/Cadena SER	29 Apr–6 May 2015	801	16.0	9.6	3.5	0.9	13.7	14.1	29.8	6.4	1.9
Metroscopia/El País	27–28 Apr 2015	1,200	18.2	12.8	3.3	0.2	13.1	13.6	31.4	4.6	4.6
CIS	23 Mar–19 Apr 2015	1,512	14.7	11.6	3.5	1.3	10.6	13.8	32.5	8.8	0.9
Metroscopia/El País	19–20 Feb 2015	1,200	16.9	9.1	2.6	3.0	9.5	15.4	38.6		1.5
Metroscopia/El País	11 Feb 2015	800	18.0	19.2	2.6	2.8	8.8	13.6	–	–	1.2
Metroscopia/El País	26 Jan 2015	?	15.4	11.0	4.2	3.9	5.3	17.8	–	–	2.4
2014 EP election	25 May 2014	—N/a	14.3	9.1	5.1	5.1	2.3	5.4	—N/a	51.5	5.2
Metroscopia/El País	24–28 Apr 2014	1,200	18.9	10.3	10.7	7.2	–	–	21.7	21.6	8.2
Metroscopia/El País	29 Apr 2013	600	18.5	12.8	11.6	6.3	–	–	14.3	26.8	5.7
2011 general election	20 Nov 2011	—N/a	38.4	19.6	6.0	7.7	–	–	—N/a	24.0	18.8
2011 regional election	22 May 2011	—N/a	34.8	17.6	6.5	4.2	0.1	–	—N/a	31.7	17.2

=== Victory preferences ===
The table below lists opinion polling on the victory preferences for each party in the event of a regional election taking place.

Polling firm/Commissioner	Fieldwork date	Sample size	PP	PSOE	IUCM–LV	UPyD	C's	Podemos	Other/ None	Question	Lead
CIS	23 Mar–19 Apr 2015	1,512	20.0	16.6	3.6	1.4	11.4	16.3	7.7	23.0	3.4

=== Victory likelihood ===
The table below lists opinion polling on the perceived likelihood of victory for each party in the event of a regional election taking place.

Polling firm/Commissioner	Fieldwork date	Sample size	PP	PSOE	IUCM–LV	UPyD	C's	Podemos	Other/ None	Question	Lead
CIS	23 Mar–19 Apr 2015	1,512	52.4	12.6	0.1	0.1	0.7	4.3	1.1	28.7	39.8

=== Preferred President ===
The table below lists opinion polling on leader preferences to become president of the Community of Madrid.

Polling firm/Commissioner	Fieldwork date	Sample size							Other/ None/ Not care	Question	Lead
Polling firm/Commissioner	Fieldwork date	Sample size	Cifuentes PP	Gabilondo PSOE	Montero IUCM–LV	Marcos UPyD	Aguado Cs	López Podemos	Other/ None/ Not care	Question	Lead
CIS (Note: Responses denoting a party's generic candidate are aggregated to that party's main candidate/leader at the time of the poll.)	23 Mar–19 Apr 2015	1,512	22.5	18.7	2.8	1.4	3.5	5.2	4.9	41.0	3.8

== Results ==
=== Overall ===
← Summary of the 24 May 2015 Assembly of Madrid election results →
Parties and alliances	Popular vote			Seats	
Parties and alliances	Votes	%	±pp	Total	+/−
People's Party (PP)	1,050,256	33.08	−18.65	48	−24
Spanish Socialist Workers' Party (PSOE)	807,385	25.43	−0.84	37	+1
We Can (Podemos)	591,697	18.64	New	27	+27
Citizens–Party of the Citizenry (C's)	385,836	12.15	+11.99	17	+17
United Left of the Community of Madrid–The Greens (IUCM–LV)	132,207	4.16	−5.47	0	−13
Union, Progress and Democracy (UPyD)	64,643	2.04	−4.28	0	−8
Vox (Vox)	37,491	1.18	New	0	±0
Animalist Party Against Mistreatment of Animals (PACMA)	32,228	1.02	+0.49	0	±0
Spain 2000 (E–2000)	6,037	0.19	New	0	±0
Spanish Phalanx of the CNSO (FE–JONS)	5,550	0.17	New	0	±0
Union for Leganés (ULEG)	5,442	0.17	+0.08	0	±0
Zero Cuts (Recortes Cero)	4,138	0.13	New	0	±0
Humanist Party (PH)	3,460	0.11	−0.02	0	±0
Communist Party of the Peoples of Spain (PCPE)	3,196	0.10	−0.09	0	±0
The National Coalition (LCN)	2,747	0.09	New	0	±0
Spanish Alternative (AES)	2,552	0.08	−0.04	0	±0
Individual Freedom Party (P–LIB)	1,860	0.06	New	0	±0
Castilian Party–Commoners' Land: Pact (PCAS–TC–Pacto)	1,755	0.06	±0.00	0	±0
Internationalist Solidarity and Self-Management (SAIn)	1,378	0.04	±0.00	0	±0
Blank ballots	34,856	1.10	−1.29		
Total	3,174,714			129	±0
Valid votes	3,174,714	99.03	+0.71		
Invalid votes	31,217	0.97	−0.71		
Votes cast / turnout	3,205,931	65.69	−0.17		
Abstentions	1,674,564	34.31	+0.17		
Registered voters	4,880,495				

Popular vote
PP	33.08%
PSOE	25.43%
Podemos	18.64%
C's	12.15%
IUCM–LV	4.16%
UPyD	2.04%
Vox	1.18%
PACMA	1.02%
Others	1.20%
Blank ballots	1.10%

Seats
PP	37.21%
PSOE	28.68%
Podemos	20.93%
C's	13.18%

=== Elected legislators ===
The following table lists the elected legislators sorted by order of election:

Elected legislators
#	Name	List
1	Cristina Cifuentes Cuencas	PP
2	Ángel Gabilondo Pujol	PSOE
3	José Manuel López Rodrigo	Podemos
4	Ángel Garrido García	PP
5	Carmen Martínez Ten ^{(es)}	PSOE
6	Ignacio Jesús Aguado Crespo	C's
7	Jaime González Taboada ^{(es)}	PP
8	Lorena Ruiz-Huerta García de Viedma	Podemos
9	Pedro González Zerolo	PSOE
10	María Paloma Adrados Gautier	PP
11	Carlos Izquierdo Torres ^{(es)}	PP
12	Mercedes Gallizo Llamas ^{(es)}	PSOE
13	Ramón Espinar Merino	Podemos
14	César Zafra Hernández ^{(d)}	C's
15	María Gádor Ongil Cores ^{(es)}	PP
16	José Manuel Freire Campo ^{(es)}	PSOE
17	Álvaro César Ballarín Valcárcel ^{(es)}	PP
18	Beatriz Gimeno Reinoso	Podemos
19	María Carmen López Ruiz	PSOE
20	Ana Isabel Mariño Ortega ^{(es)}	PP
21	Eva María Borox Montoro	C's
22	David Pérez García	PP
23	Pablo Padilla Estrada ^{(ca)}	Podemos
24	José Manuel Franco Pardo	PSOE
25	Juan Soler-Espiauba Gallo ^{(es)}	PP
26	María Pilar Llop Cuenca	PSOE
27	Cecilia Salazar-Alonso Revuelta ^{(d)}	Podemos
28	Tomás Marcos Arias	C's
29	Bartolomé González Jiménez ^{(es)}	PP
30	Juan José Moreno Navarro ^{(ca)}	PSOE
31	Francisco de Borja Sarasola Jáudenes ^{(es)}	PP
32	Jacinto Morano González	Podemos
33	Rosalía Gonzalo López	PP
34	Mónica Silvana González González	PSOE
35	Marta Marbán de Frutos ^{(d)}	C's
36	José Ignacio Echeverría Echaniz	PP
37	Carmen San José Pérez ^{(d)}	Podemos
38	José Carmelo Cepeda García de León	PSOE
39	Elena González-Moñux Vázquez	PP
40	Pilar Sánchez Acera ^{(es)}	PSOE
41	Emilio Delgado Orgaz ^{(d)}	Podemos
42	Jesús Fermosel Díaz ^{(es)}	PP
43	Daniel Álvarez Cabo	C's
44	Daniel Vicente Viondi ^{(d)}	PSOE
45	Enrique Matías Ossorio Crespo	PP
46	María Espinosa de la Llave ^{(ca)}	Podemos
47	Juan Van-Halen Acedo	PP
48	María Encarnación Moya Nieto	PSOE
49	María Eugenia Carballedo Berlanga	PP
50	Esther Ruiz Fernández	C's
51	Modesto Nolla Estrada ^{(d)}	PSOE
52	Eduardo Gutiérrez Benito	Podemos
53	Eva Tormo Mairena ^{(d)}	PP
54	Josefa Navarro Lanchas	PSOE
55	Juan Antonio Gómez-Angulo Rodríguez^{(es)}	PP
56	Jazmín Beirak Ulanosky ^{(ca)}	Podemos
57	Juan Trinidad Martos ^{(d)}	C's
58	Isabel Gema González González ^{(fr)}	PP
59	José Quintana Viar ^{(es)}	PSOE
60	Isabel Natividad Díaz Ayuso	PP
61	Raúl Camargo Fernández ^{(d)}	Podemos
62	Ana García D'Atri	PSOE
63	Luis Peral Guerra	PP
64	Alberto Reyero Zubiri ^{(es)}	C's
65	Juan Segovia Noriega ^{(ca)}	PSOE
66	Raquel Huerta Bravo ^{(d)}	Podemos
67	José Enrique Núñez Guijarro	PP
68	Pedro Manuel Rollán Ojeda	PP
69	María Reyes Maroto Illera	PSOE
70	Alejandro Sánchez Pérez ^{(es)}	Podemos
71	Ignacio García de Vinuesa Gardoqui ^{(es)}	PP
72	María Teresa de la Iglesia Vicente	C's
73	Rafael Gómez Montoya ^{(es)}	PSOE
74	Manuel Francisco Quintanar Díez ^{(d)}	PP
75	Isabel Serra Sánchez	Podemos
76	Carla Delgado Gómez	PSOE
77	Ana Isabel Pérez Baos ^{(d)}	PP
78	Enrique Rico García Hierro	PSOE
79	Pedro Núñez Morgades García de Leaniz	C's
80	María Inés Berrio Fernández-Caballero ^{(d)}	PP
81	Isidro López Hernández ^{(d)}	Podemos
82	Álvaro Moraga Valiente ^{(d)}	PP
83	Mónica Carazo Gómez	PSOE
84	Clara Serra Sánchez	Podemos
85	Diego Lozano Pérez ^{(d)}	PP
86	Enrique Veloso Lozano	C's
87	Juan Lobato Gandarias	PSOE
88	María Pilar Liébana Montijano ^{(d)}	PP
89	Miguel Ardanuy Pizarro	Podemos
90	María Isaura Leal Fernández	PSOE
91	María Isabel Redondo Alcaide ^{(d)}	PP
92	José María Arribas del Barrio	PP
93	Diego Cruz Torrijos	PSOE
94	María Dolores González Pastor	C's
95	Olga Abasolo Pozas ^{(d)}	Podemos
96	Alfonso Serrano	PP
97	María Isabel Andaluz Andaluz	PSOE
98	Ana Camins Martínez ^{(d)}	PP
99	Hugo Martínez Abarca	Podemos
100	Pedro Pablo García Rojo Garrido	PSOE
101	Luis del Olmo Flórez ^{(d)}	PP
102	Francisco Lara Casanova	C's
103	María Josefa Aguado del Olmo ^{(d)}	PP
104	Josefa Pardo Ortiz ^{(es)}	PSOE
105	Elena Sevillano de las Heras ^{(d)}	Podemos
106	José Manuel Berzal Andrade ^{(d)}	PP
107	Agustín Vinagre Alcázar ^{(d)}	PSOE
108	Miguel Ongil López ^{(es)}	Podemos
109	Susana Solís Pérez	C's
110	Miguel Angel Ruiz López	PP
111	María Carmen Mena Romero	PSOE
112	Daniel Ortiz Espejo ^{(es)}	PP
113	Laura Díaz Román ^{(d)}	Podemos
114	José Ángel Gómez Chamorro Torres	PSOE
115	Jacobo Ramón Beltrán Pedreira ^{(ca)}	PP
116	Jesús Ricardo Megías Morales	C's
117	Sonsoles Trinidad Aboín Aboín ^{(d)}	PP
118	Eva María Manguan Valderrama ^{(es)}	PSOE
119	Marco Candela Pokoma ^{(d)}	Podemos
120	María Cristina Álvarez Sánchez	PP
121	Nicolás Rodríguez García	PSOE
122	Antonio González Terol	PP
123	Mónica García Gómez	Podemos
124	Juan Ramón Rubio Ruiz	C's
125	María Lucía Inmaculada Casares Díaz	PSOE
126	José Tortosa de la Iglesia	PP
127	Eduardo Fernández Rubiño	Podemos
128	José Cabrera Orellana ^{(d)}	PP
129	Pedro Santín Fernández	PSOE

== Aftermath ==
=== Government formation ===
Investiture; Nomination of Cristina Cifuentes (PP)
Ballot →	24 June 2015
Required majority →	65 out of 129
Yes: • PP (48); • C's (17)	65 / 129
No: • PSOE (37); • Podemos (27)	64 / 129
Abstentions	0 / 129
Absentees	0 / 129

=== 2017 motion of no confidence ===
Motion of no confidence Nomination of Lorena Ruiz-Huerta (Podemos)
Ballot →	8 June 2017
Required majority →	65 out of 129
Yes: • Podemos (27)	27 / 129
No: • PP (48); • C's (17)	64 / 129
Abstentions: • PSOE (37)	37 / 129
Absentees	1 / 129

=== 2018 investiture ===
The PSOE announced that it would table a motion of no confidence on Cifuentes' government, after it was revealed that Cifuentes could have obtained a master's degree through fraudulent means and that documents were falsified in order to cover up the scandal. After Cifuentes's resignation as a result of the ensuing scandals, the motion of censure was cancelled and Ángel Garrido was elected as new president.

Investiture; Nomination of Ángel Garrido (PP)
Ballot →	18 May 2018
Required majority →	65 out of 129
Yes: • PP (48); • C's (17)	65 / 129
No: • PSOE (37); • Podemos (27)	64 / 129
Abstentions	0 / 129
Absentees	0 / 129

== Bibliography ==
- Ley Orgánica 3/1983, de 25 de febrero, de Estatuto de Autonomía de la Comunidad de Madrid (Organic Law 3/1983). Official State Gazette (in Spanish). 25 February 1983 [version as of 17 July 2010]. BOE-A-1983-6317.
- Ley Orgánica 5/1985, de 19 de junio, del Régimen Electoral General (Organic Law 5/1985). Official State Gazette (in Spanish). 19 June 1985 [version as of 31 March 2015]. BOE-A-1985-11672.
- Ley 11/1986, de 16 de diciembre, Electoral de la Comunidad de Madrid (Law 11/1986). Official State Gazette (in Spanish). 16 December 1986 [version as of 29 December 2006]. BOE-A-1987-4255.
- Ley 5/1990, de 17 de mayo, reguladora de la facultad de disolución de la Asamblea de Madrid por el Presidente de la Comunidad (Law 5/1990). Official State Gazette (in Spanish). 17 May 1990 [version as of 29 May 1990]. BOE-A-1987-4255.
- Decreto 8/2015, de 30 de marzo, del Presidente de la Comunidad de Madrid, por el que se convocan elecciones a la Asamblea de Madrid (PDF) (Decree 8/2015). Official Gazette of the Community of Madrid (in Spanish). 30 March 2015. BOCM-20150331-1.
