= Spanish Ombudsman =

Spanish ombudsman of the Cortes Generales

- Defensor del Pueblo
- Coat of arms of Spain

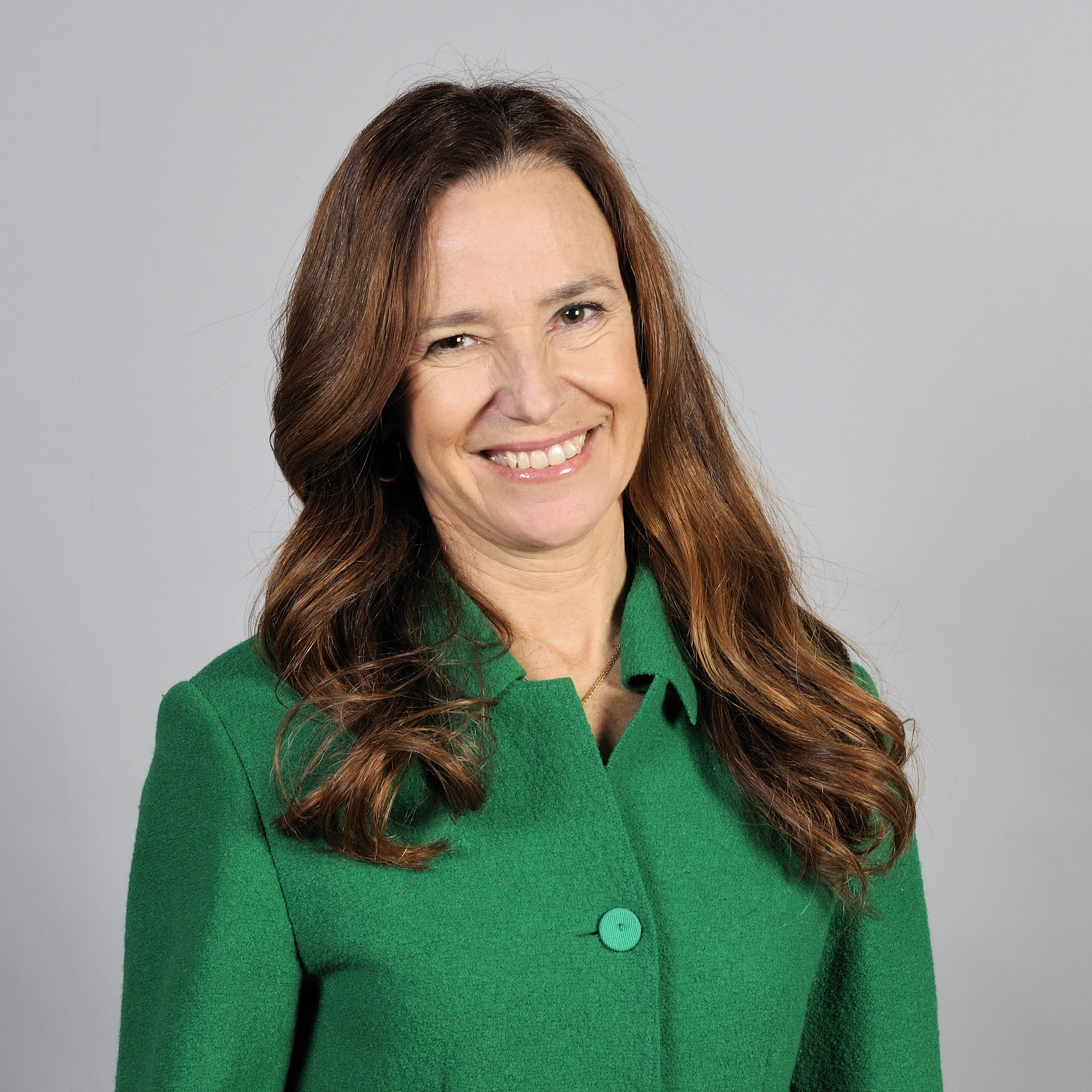
- Incumbent; Teresa Jiménez-Becerril; Acting since 18 November 2026
- Style: The Most Excellent (formal); Mr. Ombudsman (informal)
- Nominator: Cortes Generales
- Appointer: Speaker of the Congress Speaker of the Senate
- Term length: 5 years
- Constituting instrument: Spanish Constitution
- Formation: 1981
- First holder: Joaquín Ruiz-Giménez Cortés
- Deputy: First Deputy Ombudsman
- Salary: € 119,755.23 per year
- Website: https://www.defensordelpueblo.es/en/

The Spanish Ombudsman or Defender of the People (Spanish: Defensor del Pueblo) is the ombudsman of the Cortes Generales responsible for defending the fundamental rights and public liberties of citizens by supervising the activity of public administrations.

The ombudsman is created by the Constitution and regulated by an Organic Law of 1981. The ombudsman and the two deputy ombudsmans are nominated by both the Congress of Deputies and Senate through a joint committee that chooses the candidates and proposes them to the Chambers. The candidates must be approved by three-fifths of both Chambers. If these qualified majorities are not reached, a new joint committee must to be formed to choose another candidate or to maintain the previous one but the second must get in a second voting three fifths of the Congress and an absolute majority of the Senate. To be chosen ombudsman it is necessary to be a Spaniard, adult and having the full enjoyment of one's civil and political rights.

The Ombudsman ceases by resignation, expiration of the term of appointment, by death or disability, by acting with gross negligence in compliance with the obligations and duties of the office or by having been convicted, by final judgment, of willful misconduct. In the case that the office is vacant, it is the First Deputy Ombudsman who assumes the office as Acting Ombudsman.

== Prerogatives and incompatibilities ==
=== Prerogatives ===
The Ombudsman will not receive instructions from any authority. They will carry out their functions independently and at their own discretion.

The Ombudsman will enjoy absolute immunity. They can not be arrested, disciplined, fined, persecuted or judged on the basis of the opinions they formulate or the acts they perform in the exercise of the powers inherent to the position. In all other cases, and while they remain in the exercise of their functions, the Ombudsman can not be detained or retained except in the case of flagrante delicto, corresponding to the decision on their indictment, imprisonment, prosecution and trial exclusively to the Criminal Room of the Supreme Court.

The above rules will be applicable to the Deputy Ombudsmans in the performance of their duties.

=== Incompatibilities ===
The condition of Ombudsman is incompatible with any representative mandate; with any political office or political propaganda activity; with the permanence in the active service of any Public Administration; with the affiliation to a political party or the performance of directive functions in a political party or in a union, association or foundation, and with the employment at the service of them; with the exercise of judicial and fiscal careers, and with any professional, liberal, mercantile or labor activity.

The Ombudsman must cease, within ten days following their appointment and before taking office, in any situation of incompatibility that may affect them, understanding otherwise that they do not accept the appointment.

If the incompatibility occurred once the position has been taken, it shall be understood that they resign on the date on which it occurred.

== Subordinates ==
The Ombudsman is assisted by a First Deputy and a Second Deputy Ombudsman, in which they can delegate their functions and who will replace them by order, in the exercise of the same, in the cases of temporary impossibility and cessation. The Ombudsman shall appoint and separate their Deputies following the approval of the Cortes Generales in the manner determined by their Regulations. The Ombudsman may freely appoint the extra advisors necessary for the exercise of their functions, in accordance with the Regulations and within budgetary limits. People who are in the service of the Ombudsman are considered as a person at the service of the Cortes Generales.

The deputies and advisers will automatically cease at the moment of taking possession of a new Ombudsman.

The deputies have the same prerogatives and incompatibilities and the same requirements to be chosen Deputy Ombudsman as the Ombudsman.

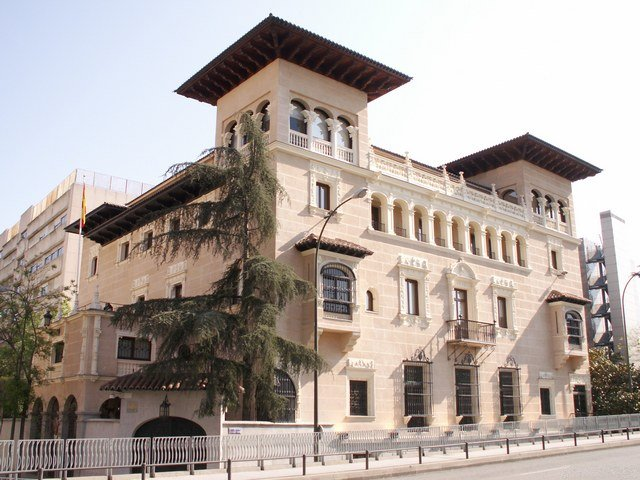
The Palace of Bermejillo, the headquarters of the Ombudsman

== Work area ==
The Ombudsman not only looks after the fulfillment of the human rights in the General State Administration but also in the regional and local administrations. They can do so ex officio or by the request of a third party. When the Ombudsman receives complaints regarding the acting of the Administration of Justice, they should be redirected to the Public Prosecutor's Office so that the latter may investigate its reality and adopt the appropriate measures in accordance with the law, or transfer them to the General Council of the Judiciary, according to the type of claim in question; all this without prejudice to the reference that in their general report to the Cortes Generales can do to the subject.

The Ombudsman will also ensure respect for the rights in the scope of the Military Administration, without it interfering in the command of the National Defense.

=== Coordination with regional ombudsmen ===
With the evolution of the different regional administrations during the Spanish transition to democracy, numerous bodies similar to the Ombudsman were created and it was necessary to regulate the competences and relations between these bodies and the State Ombudsman and this was made by a Law in 1985.

The protection of the rights and freedoms in the regional level can be made in coordination between the regional Ombudsman and the State Ombudsman. If the administration who made the violation of human rights is the State Administration acting in the region, the State Ombudsman has priority but may ask for assistance of the regional ombudsman in order to be more efficient as well as giving them a copy of the final report with the investigation.

== List of Ombudsmen ==
Status

Denotes service as acting Ombudsmen

No.	Portrait	Name	Took office	Left office	Duration
1º		Joaquín Ruiz-Giménez (1913–2009)	30 December 1982	30 December 1987	5 years, 0 days
-		Álvaro Gil-Robles; Acting Ombudsman (1944–)	30 December 1987	16 March 1988	77 days
2º		Álvaro Gil-Robles (1944–)	16 March 1988	16 March 1993	5 years, 0 days
-		Margarita Retuerto Buades; Acting Ombudsman (1944–2005)	16 March 1993	1 December 1994	1 year, 260 days
3º		Fernando Álvarez de Miranda (1924–2016)	1 December 1994	1 December 1999	5 years, 0 days
-		Antonio Rovira Viñas; Acting Ombudsman (1952–)	1 December 1999	15 June 2000	197 days
4º		Enrique Múgica Herzog (1924–2020)	15 June 2000	30 June 2010	10 years, 15 days
-		María Luisa Cava de Llano; Acting Ombudsman (1948–)	30 June 2010	21 July 2012	2 years, 21 days
5º		Soledad Becerril; Ombudsman (1948–)	21 July 2012	21 July 2017	5 years, 0 days
-		Francisco Fernández Marugán; Acting Ombudsman (1946–2025)	21 July 2017	18 November 2021	4 years, 120 days
6º		Ángel Gabilondo; Ombudsman (1949–)	18 November 2021	18 November 2026	5 years, 0 days
-		Teresa Jiménez-Becerril; Acting Ombudsman (1961–)	18 November 2026	Incumbent	−1 day
