= Cayetano Hilario Abellán =

Spanish sculptor

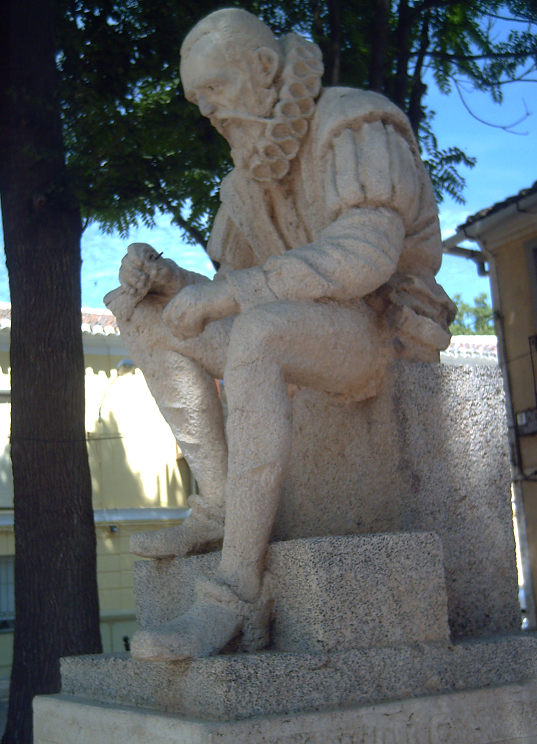
The writer Miguel De Cervantes

Cayetano Hilario Abellán (born 21 May 1916 in Argamasilla de Alba, Spain – died 1997) was a Spanish self-taught sculptor who produced sculptures based on different themes. His work is known because of his group of characters from the Miguel de Cervantes' well known novel Don Quixote (The Ingenious Gentleman Don Quixote of La Mancha), among others.

== Biography ==
Son of Cayetano Hilario, mayor of Argamasilla de Alba during the II Republic and the Spanish civil war and Juliana Abellán, he was the third of six sons. He affiliated with the communist party in Francoist Spain. Cayetano, like others that fought the Nationalists in the Spanish civil war went to jail during 1944–1945. He lost one of his brothers during the war, Julián Hilario.

He found his passion in sculpture as a child, he began his career as a bricklayer and self-taught himself the art of sculpture in his free time, it wasn't until the civil war was over when he switched his career to sculpture. His sculptures, of Quixotic, religious or costumbrism themes, can be seen in Argamasilla de Alba and other villages around. His main source of inspiration was the book Don Quijote de La Mancha, which is said to be partly written in Argamasilla de Alba. Cayetano himself helped on the restoration of the cave of Medrano, the jail where it is said that Cervantes started writing the book while a prisoner.

Because of his political views, he was once in Francoist Spain denied the prize of a contest from which he was the winner, but Cayetano, like many others in Argamasilla de Alba was a peaceful man that respected other people's opinions, in his own words: «I am friend with everyone and everyone is my friend. I have friends of all ideologies. I am a religious and traditional man. I understand politics as a fight of ideas, not as a road to violence.» He married Cristina Torres, with whom he had four children.

Due to his artistic career, the city council named him favourite son of the town on September 7, 1979.

Cayetano died in 1997. In 2016 two memorial plaques that recall the places where Cayetano Hilario lived and worked were erected in Argamasilla de Alba.

== Works ==
Hilario's works are mostly shown and located at public places scattered on several towns and villages in La Mancha region. The rest of his pieces belong to private owners. Being an admirer of Auguste Rodin and Michelangelo’s sculptures, as well as a tireless reader of Cervantes’s novels, Cayetano Hilario expresses part of his artistic inspiration by materializing the main characters of Cervantes’ book into “realistic” personages in natural sizes. In order to do so, he used the people around him basically his family and native friends as models.

=== Don Quixote ===
This sculptural group, inspired by the book of Don Quijote de La Mancha, consists of four masterpieces: Don Quijote, his squire Sancho Panza, his idealized Lady, Dulcinea del Toboso, and the writer Miguel de Cervantes himself, placed in main squares in Abellan's place of birth.

We can admire in this group of sculptures, an impressive Don Quijote, which represents the Honourable Knight when he was still Alonso Quijano. He is humanized as an inhabitant of the Village, who would later become an idealist knight who wants to fight against the injustices of the world. The sculpture shows us Alonso Quijano while he is reading one of his countless books of chivalry orders leaning on one hand and looking up, imaging his next adventures.

=== Sancho Panza ===
The figure of Sancho Panza seems to be a native of the Village, as well. Sancho is carrying some wine and cheese, which are typical products from this area.

=== Dulcinea of La Mancha ===
The Aldonza Lorenzo sculpture- named Dulcinea of La Mancha (Dulzura of La Mancha) by Don Quijote. This sculpture has been modeled by the Sculptor into a realistic country young woman with a pitcher full of water in a confident attitude towards the future.

=== Cervantes ===
Abellán completes this sculptural group with his work on the writer Miguel de Cervantes. We can admire this great masterpiece of the Spanish writer from the 16th century. The Writer is sitting and has got a thoughtful attitude. One of his hands is holding some rolled paper and we can notice his maimed left hand, which gave the famous Writer the nickname of The one-handed man from Lepanto.

=== Other sculptures in honour of writers and field works ===
Other sculptures created by the same Artist are sculptures made in honour of some well-known Spanish writers such as Azorín (See picture) and the poets Miguel Hernández and Vicente Cano, and his pieces, made in recognition of several typical country professions, (such as The Shepherd, The Harvester or The Grape harvest), The National Teacher and Musicians.
