= Palace of Bermejillo =

Building in neo-plateresque style in Madrid, Spain

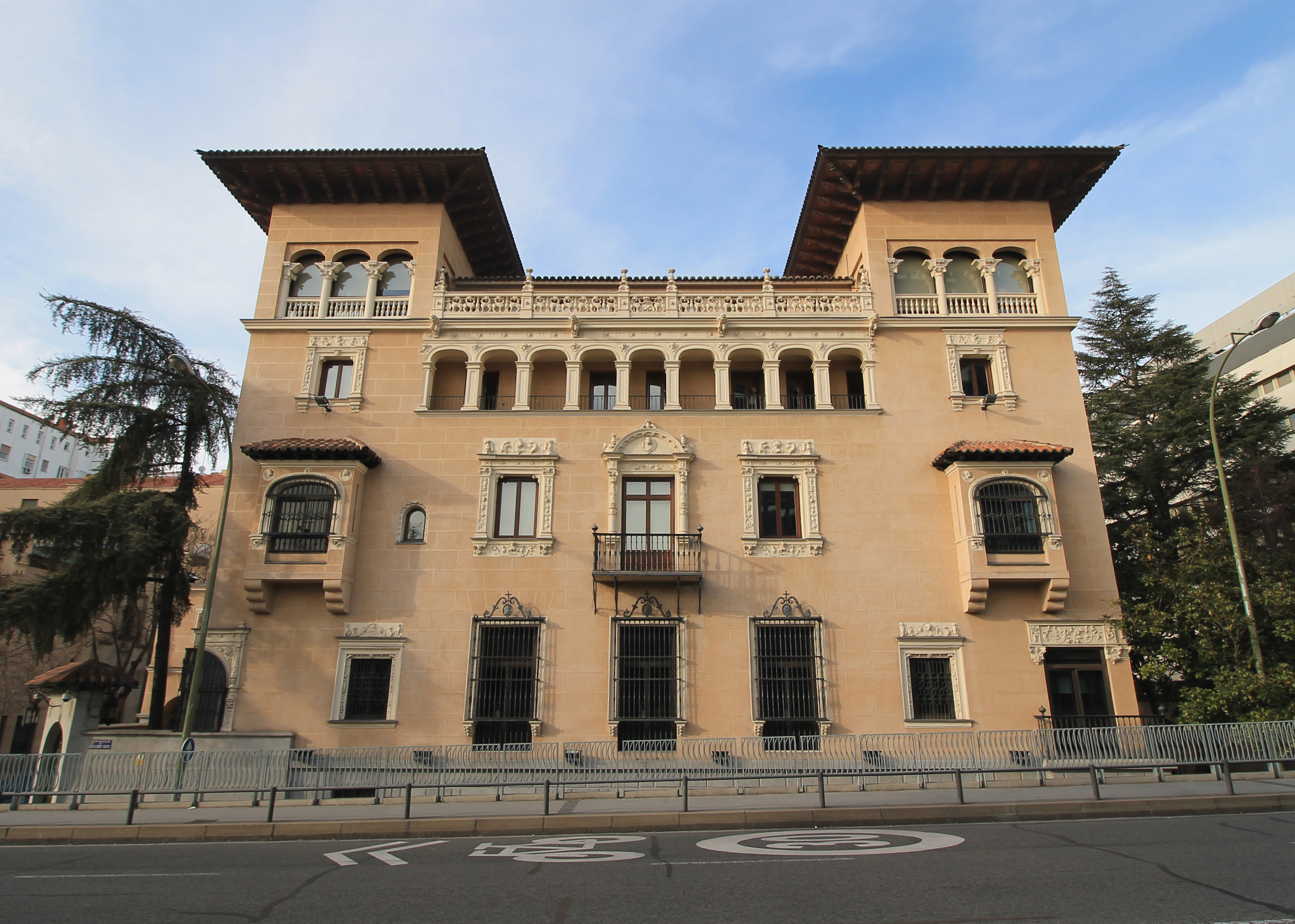
- Interactive map of the Palace of Bermejillo area

General information
- Location: Paseo de Eduardo Dato 31, Madrid, Spain
- Coordinates: 40°26′0″N 3°41′23″W
- Construction started: 1913
- Completed: 1916

Design and construction
- Architects: Francisco Reynals Toledo, Frank Rank, Eladio Laredo, Benito Guitart

The Palace of Bermejillo (Spanish: Palacio de Bermejillo), also known as the Palace of the Marquises of Bermejillo del Rey, is a building in Madrid, Spain, built in neo-plateresque style. It currently houses the seat of the Defender of the People (the Spanish Ombudsman).

== History and description ==
It is located at Paseo de Eduardo Dato 31, in the Almagro neighborhood.

The project was initially commissioned to Francisco Reynals Toledo (later replaced by Frank Rank). Influenced by the neoplateresque Spanish pavilion for the 1900 International Exposition in Paris, it closely followed the project of the 16th-century Palace of Caicedo in Granada. Built between 1913 and 1916, the works were directed by Eladio Laredo and Benito Guitart.

It became the headquarters of the Spanish Ombudsman in 1983.
