= Mercedes Cabrera =

Spanish politician (born 1951)

Mercedes Cabrera Calvo-Sotelo
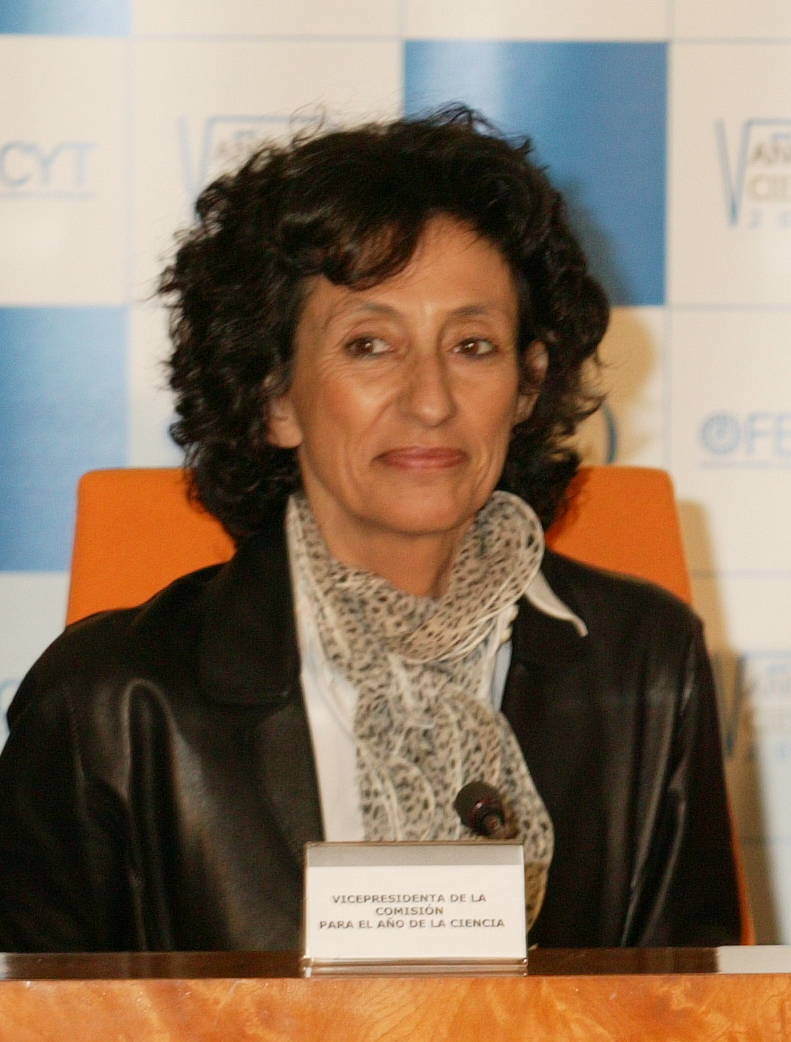

Minister of Education and Science
- In office 7 April 2006 – 7 April 2009
- President: José Luis Rodríguez Zapatero
- Preceded by: María Jesús San Segundo
- Succeeded by: Ángel Gabilondo

Personal details
- Born: 12 December 1951 (age 74) Madrid, Madrid, Spain
- Party: PSOE

Mercedes Cabrera Calvo-Sotelo, GCIH (born 3 December 1951) is a Spanish politician, political scientist, historian, and minister. She is also niece of Leopoldo Calvo-Sotelo Bustelo, former prime minister and of former foreign minister Fernando Morán Lopez and grandniece of the physicist Blas Cabrera Felipe.

== Biography ==
Cabrera holds a PhD in political sciences and sociology from the Complutense University of Madrid and from 1996 onwards she was professor of history of Political Theory and of the social and political movements in the Complutense University.

She is married to Carlos Arenillas, vice-president of the Comisión Nacional del Mercado de Valores (CNMV, Spanish National Stock Exchange Commission) and has two children. She has been a Spanish Socialist Workers' Party (PSOE) deputy for the constituency of Madrid since 2004 when she ran second on the party list after Prime Minister José Luis Rodríguez Zapatero. She was chosen as chair of the Parliamentary committee on education and science in the Congress of the Deputies. She is a member of the board of governors of the Pablo Iglesias Foundation and president of the Association of Friends of the "Residencia de Estudiantes". Also she has been a teacher at the "Estudio" School of Madrid. On 7 April 2006 she was named Spanish minister of education and science by Prime Minister José Luis Rodríguez Zapatero, Position she held until April 2009 when she was substituted by Ángel Gabilondo.

== Honours ==
- Grand-Cross of the Order of Prince Henry, Portugal (25 September 2006)

== Published works ==
- The employer's association before the Second Republic. Organizations and strategy (1931–1936). Publishing Century XXI. 1983.ISBN 84-323-0469-7.
- The power of the industrialists. Policy and economy in contemporary Spain (1875–2000). Publishing Taurus. 2002. ISBN 84-306-0439-1.
- With light and stenographers: Parliament in the Restoration (1913–1923). Taurus Editorial. 1998. ISBN 84-306-0293-3.
- The industry, the press and the policy: Nicholas Maria de Urgoiti (1869–1951). Publishing Alliance. 1994. ISBN 84-206-9406-1.
