= José Manuel López Rodrigo =

Spanish politician

José Manuel López
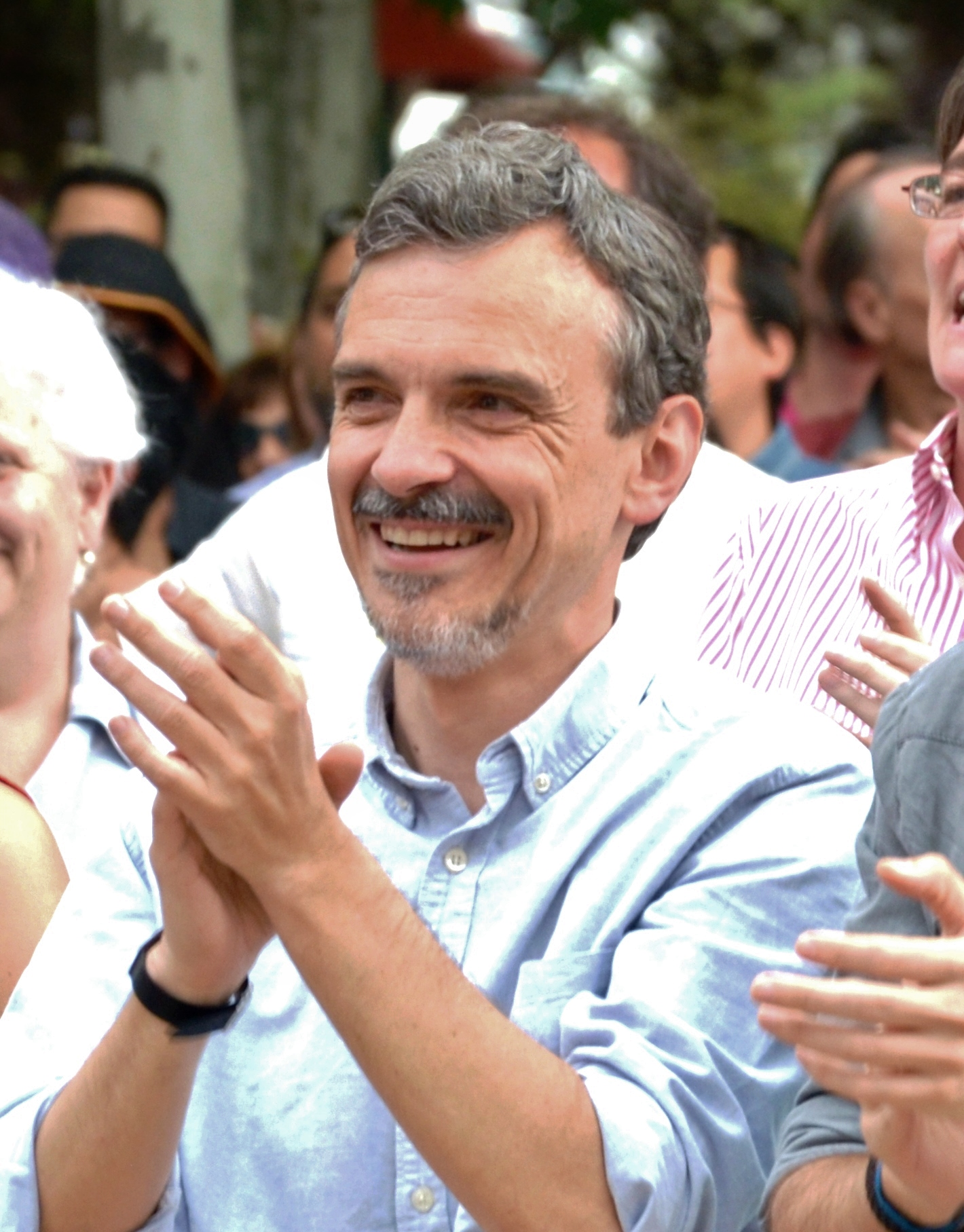
- In May 2015

Member of the Assembly of Madrid
- In office 9 June 2015 – 2 April 2019

Personal details
- Born: 8 June 1966 (age 60) Madrid
- Citizenship: Spanish
- Party: Podemos (2015–2019)
- Occupation: Politician, activist

José Manuel López Rodrigo (born 1966) is a Spanish activist and politician. He has been a member of the 10th Assembly of Madrid in the Podemos parliamentary group.

== Biography ==
Born on 8 June 1966 in Madrid, he is a neighbor of Manoteras, in the district of Hortaleza. Active in the associative and Christian grassroots movements, he founded the radio station Radio Enlace. He obtained a degree as Agronomy Engineer at the Polytechnic University of Madrid (UPM) and a diplomature in Territorial Ordering, Rural Development and Environment at the Polytechnic University of Valencia (UPV).

He worked for Caritas and the Tomillo foundation. During the government of José Luis Rodríguez Zapatero, he also served as director of the state-funded Pluralismo y Convivencia Foundation, dependent on the Ministry of Justice, charged with the collaboration with minority religious confessions.

He ran as head of the Podemos list in the May 2015 regional election in Madrid; elected member of the regional legislature, he became the spokesperson of the Podemos parliamentary group in the chamber. In December 2016, after the Ramón Espinar's victory in the Podemos regional primaries in Madrid in November 2016, López, considered a member of the errejonista faction, was replaced as spokesperson of the parliamentary group by Lorena Ruiz-Huerta.

In March 2019 he was left out from the list led by Íñigo Errejón to the primary election to choose the electoral list of Más Madrid vis-à-vis the 2019 Madrilenian regional election. He declare "that is the state of things, (these things) are proposals coming from the (party) management, I have come here for four years, and I will keep on working in other areas".
