= Vicente Cano =

Spanish poet

Vicente Cano (January 1, 1927, Argamasilla de Alba – July 11, 1994, Ciudad Real) was a Spanish poet.

== Biography ==
Son of Vicente Cano García, a tailor and Rosa Cano Ramírez, he was born in Argamasilla de Alba after the family moved there from Moral de Calatrava, his father's family were originally from Albuñol. Sixth of eight children, four men and four women, Vicente had a childhood of economic straits in the middle of the Spanish Civil War. His brother Antonio was a pilot of the FARE, achieving with the arrival of democracy the rank of commander. His father, a tailor, had a business that required him to work all day and part of the night, his wife and daughters would help regularly in the business. When Vicente was 25, he started writing poems to his then girlfriend, Teresa, who would later become his wife and with whom he will have three children. He died of cancer at the age of 67, leaving a wide literary imprint.

== Literary activity ==
In 1964 he attends the Literary Meetings in Ruidera at the hands of Pascual Antonio Beño and he writes verses with a thematic similar to that of the also manchego poet Juan Alcaide: the landscape and countryside of La Mancha in which he was raised and educated, his children, the Sun, Christmas and, finally, the Hope that will illuminate the dark side of life.

He participated in the First Anthology (Primera Antología) of the Literary Group Guadiana, a group that he managed to direct, as well as its magazine, Manxa, which was opened to all the poets of Latin America. In 1973 he got a job in Ciudad Real and set up his residence there.

He directed the "Literary Group Guadiana", and shortly after he began to publish Manxa Magazine, which first issue appears in 1975 in the form of "Literary Pliegos". As director, animator and great creator of this magazine, he will be recognized in the 50th issue in September 1990, by various poets both Spanish and abroad.

In this same year, Anthology of Group Guadiana is published in Ciudad Real 1986 where, apart from being the Director of the Literary Group, Vicente brings a series of poems with fundamental themes: life, poetry, truth, La Mancha.

In 1987 he participates in the "1st International Poetry Biennial" held in Madrid and two years later he is invited to the "50th Congress of Extremadura Writers" in Zafra (Badajoz).

Until the publication of a new book in 1991, he collaborates with several tribute poems to various poets. Vicente continues to collaborate writing some poems in several magazines and newspapers of which he was a regular, such as Arquero or Lanza. In his efforts in the direction of the Literary Group Guadiana and Manxa Magazine Vicente Cano departed from Argamasilla de Alba, but his latest book was published and presented in this place.

Vicente died on July 11, 1994, after fighting cancer, leaving a large number of poems and five unpublished works, some ready for printing.

== Bibliography ==
- In 1965 his first poems were printed in magazines such as Arquero in Barcelona and newspapers as Lanza in Ciudad Real, among others.

=== Books ===
- Inquietude (Inquitetud), May 1969 edited in Madrid by Gráficas Horizonte S.A.
- When it's never late (Cuando nunca sea tarde), 1979 printed in Ciudad Real.
- People of Light and amazement (Gentes de Luz y de asombro) (Tributes),1984, compilation of poems previously published and dedicated to significant personalities in his life and absent friends.
- The poets of the Guadiana to Alfonso X "the Wise" (Los poetas del Guadiana a Alfonso X, el Sabio), 1984 collective work where Vicente brings the poem "New Canticles for a wise king, troubadour of the Virgin."
- Poems of the rope (Poemas de la cuerda), dedicated especially to quijotes and dreamers.
- Love is a rain (Amor es una lluvia),1986 which central idea is "Love" as a mature fruit of a life, of a struggle.
- Verses for thirst (Versos para la sed) and The Glare of the Roots (El Fulgor de las Raíces).
- Anthology: Presence of the Return (Presencia del Regreso) 1994, that collects what he considers the best of his work, published or unpublished.
- Hill of splendors (Alcor de resplandores), (Tributes)

== Named after him ==
- "Vicente Cano" High school in Argamasilla de Alba
- Vicente Cano National Prize for poetry
- Park Vicente Cano in Argamasilla de Alba

== Awards ==
- "Cueva de Medrano" 1967
- "Pámpanas Amarillas" 1970
- "Vino Nuevo" 1971
- "Jaraiz" 1974
- "Bernardo de Balbuena", 1976
- "Juan Alcaide" 1976
- "Rosa del Azafrán" 1978
- "Primer Premio Nacional de Poesía en verso libre" 1980
- "Cencibel" 1982.

== Honours ==
- "Member of the Academicians of Argamasilla" (Los Académicos de la Argamasilla) 1988
- "Great Commander of the Literary Order Francisco de Quevedo" 1989
