= Joan Abellan i Mula =

Catalan playwright

Joan Abellan i Mula (born 1946 in Barcelona, Spain) is a Catalan playwright and essayist.

Abellan i Mula is a professor of theater arts at the Institut del Teatre de Barcelona (Barcelona Institute of Theater), and author of several plays. Additionally, Abellan i Mula has published numerous essays on the topic of theater arts. In 1989 he won the Prudenci Bertarna prize for the novel La dona sense attributs ("The woman without qualities"), written with J. Melendres. He has also translated Bertolt Brecht into the Catalan language, and has produced scripts for television. He has contributed to the magazine Pipirijaina, and published several articles in Estudis Escènics (Stage Studies).

== Works ==
=== Plays ===
- Home tocant el flabiol damunt d’un nuvol (1971)
- El bon samarità, càntir amunt, càntir avall ("The good Samaritan, pitcher up, pitcher down") (1976) awarded the Joan Santamaria prize
- El collaret d’algues vermelles ("The necklace of red seaweed") (1979) written with J. Melendres, awarded the Gold Critica Serra prize
- Despertar glaçat de primavera (1982) awarded the Ignasi Iglésias
- La ruta del salmo (1984) awarded the Ignasi Igésias
- Eclipsi ("Eclipse") (1986)
- La temporada d’hivernacle ("The Greenhouse Season") (1987).

=== Essays ===
- "La representacio teatral: Introduccio als llenguatges del teatre actual" ("Theatrical Representation: Introduction to the Language of Contemporary Theater") (1983)
- "Artaud i el teatre" ("Artaud and the theater") (1988)
- "El trallat de miralls" (1990)
- "La poesia escènica de Joan Brossa i el sentit de l’aventura contemporània" ("The scenic poetry of Joan Brossa and the meaning of the contemporary adventure") (1994)
- "Drama" in Teoria literària ("Literary Theory") (1997)
- "Boal conta Boal" (2001)
