= Argamasilla de Alba =

- Municipality
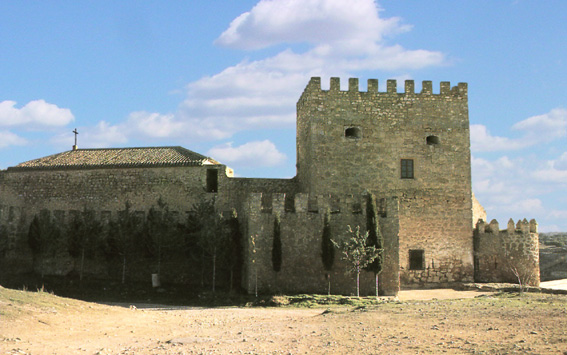
- Castle of Argamasilla de Alba

- Flag Coat of arms

- Location in Spain.
- Coordinates: 39°07′45″N 3°5′20″W
- Country: Spain
- Autonomous community: Castile-La Mancha
- Province: Ciudad Real
- Comarca: Mancha
- Judicial district: Tomelloso

Government
  - Mayor: Pedro Ángel Jiménez Carretón (PSOE)

Area
  - Total: 242 km^{2} (93 sq mi)
- Elevation: 671 m (2,201 ft)

Population (2025-01-01)
  - Total: 6,777
  - Density: 28.0/km^{2} (72.5/sq mi)
- Demonym: Argamasilleros
- Time zone: UTC+1 (CET)
  - Summer (DST): UTC+2 (CEST)
- Postal code: 13710

Argamasilla de Alba is a municipality in the Province of Ciudad Real, Castile-La Mancha, Spain. It has a population of 6,791.

According to local legend, Don Quixote author Miguel de Cervantes was held prisoner here, and refers to the municipality in the prologue of Don Quixote Part I, making a joke about imprisonment – "engendered in a jail" – because the word "argamasilla" is Spanish for "mortar". The text talks about it as the place where Don Quixote is buried, and that the "Academicians of Argamasilla" meet at the gravesite.

Contrary to the foundation of the joke, Argamasilla de Alba has never had a group of academicians working there, and modern Cervantes scholars believe this is a reference to his well-documented imprisonment in the Cárcel Real of Seville. José María Casasayas, founder of the Asociación de Cervantes, delivered a paper in 1999 in which he proposed that the town in Part I of the novel was Argamasilla de Alba, but in Part II, internal evidence suggests it was Argamasilla de Calatrava, a confusion deliberately created by Cervantes.

The town's tourist and cultural office is located in a rebuilt house, the "Casa de Medrano", which contains beneath the "Cave of Medrano", in which Cervantes' imprisonment allegedly took place. In the nineteenth century, Juan Eugenio Hartzenbusch had a printing press set up in the cave and printed there an edition of Don Quixote. In keeping with the action of the novel's "Academicians of Argamasilla", the Asociación de Cervantistas held its annual meeting in Argamasilla de Alba in 1995, and returned for a meeting in 2005.

== Gallery ==
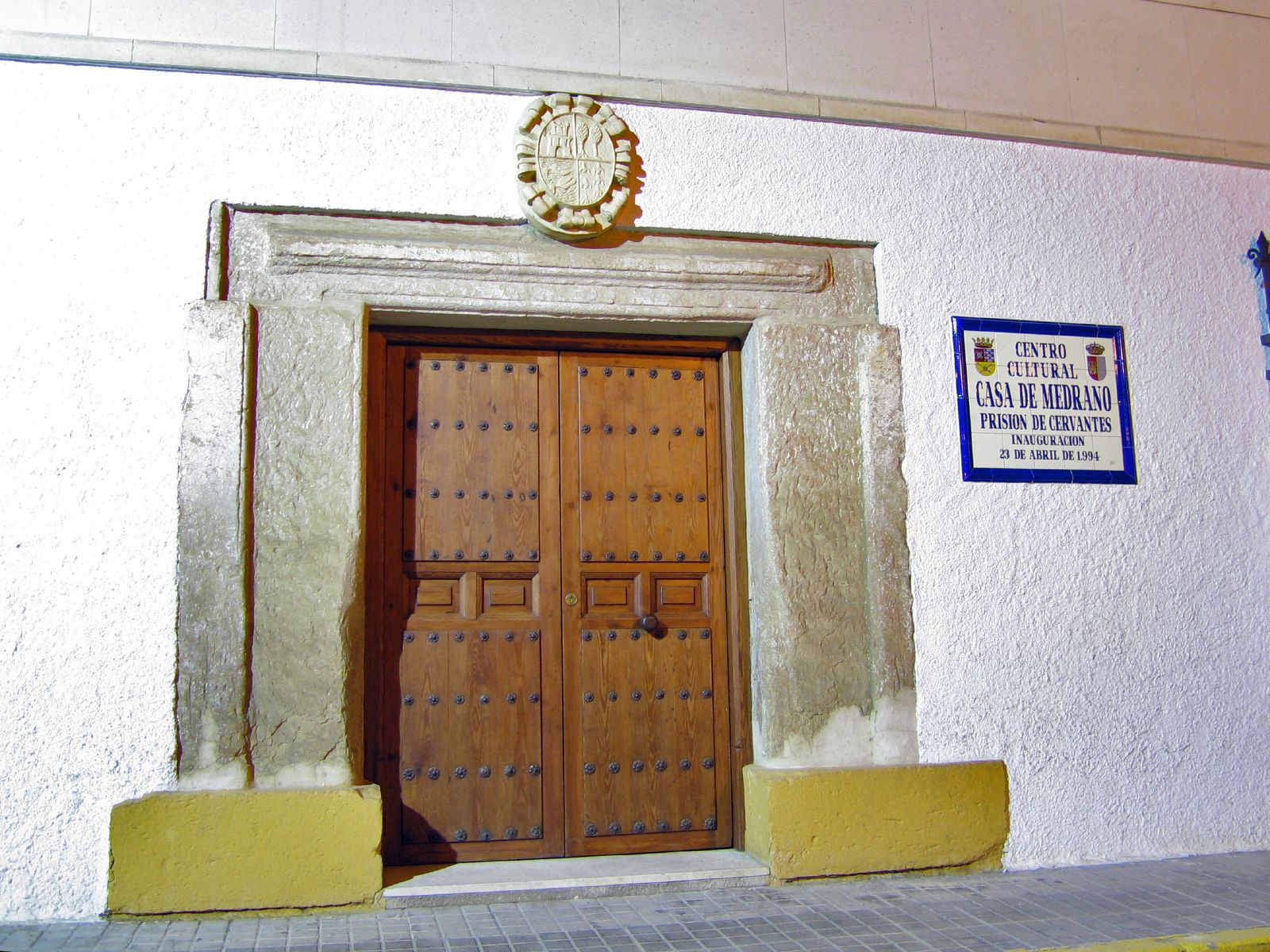
Casa de Medrano, with signage Prision de Cervantes

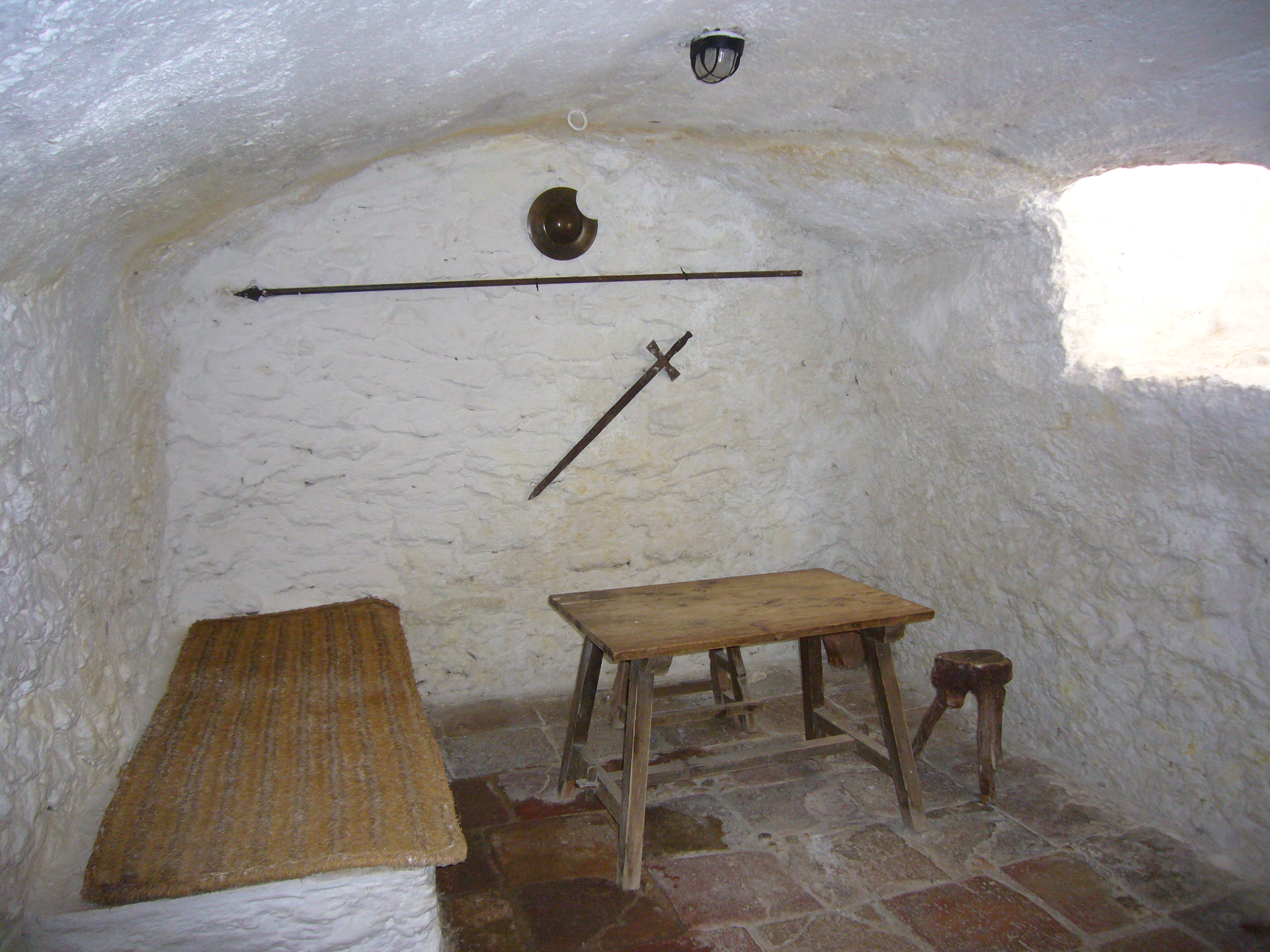
Interior of the Casa de Medrano

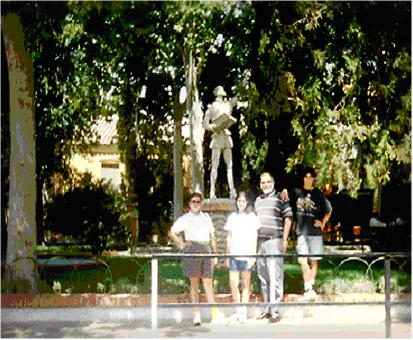
Monument to Don Quixote, by Cayetano Hilario Abellán.

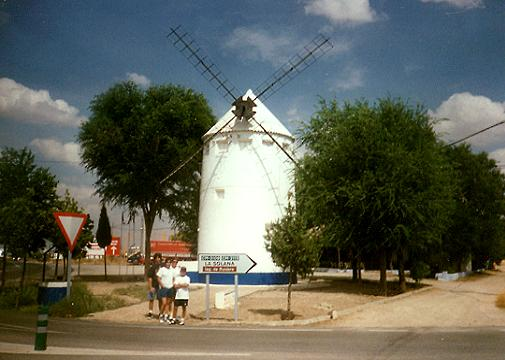
Windmill
