= Ángel Gabilondo =

Spanish politician and professor

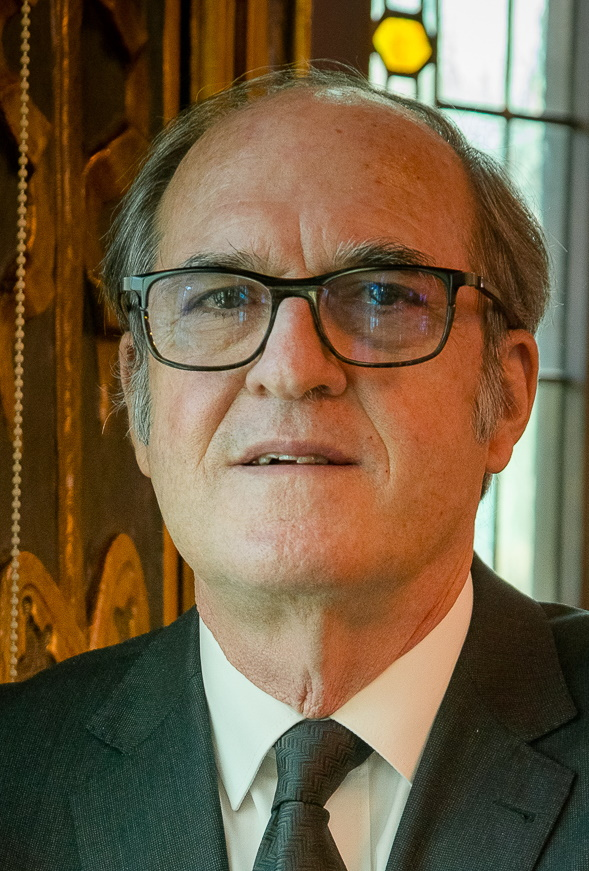
- Official portrait, 2022.

Ombudsman of Spain
- In office 18 November 2021 – 18 November 2026
- Monarch: Felipe VI
- Deputy: Teresa Jiménez-Becerril
- Preceded by: Francisco Fernández Marugán (acting)
- Succeeded by: Teresa Jiménez-Becerril (acting)

Minister of Education
- In office 7 April 2009 – 22 December 2011
- Prime Minister: José Luis Rodríguez Zapatero
- Preceded by: Mercedes Cabrera
- Succeeded by: José Ignacio Wert

Member of the Assembly of Madrid
- In office 10 June 2015 – 8 June 2021

Personal details
- Born: Ángel Gabilondo Pujol; 1 March 1949 (age 77) San Sebastián, Spain
- Party: Independent (linked to PSOE)
- Education: Autonomous University of Madrid

Ángel Gabilondo Pujol (born 1 March 1949) is a Spanish university professor, currently serving as the 6th Ombudsman of Spain.

Between 2009 and 2011, he was Minister of Education in José Luis Rodríguez Zapatero's Cabinet.

In June 2011, he received the Medalla de Oro for the Universidad de Málaga. On 30 December 2011 he received a condecoration for the Order of Charles III and also the Orden de Alfonso X el Sabio on 26 December 2014.

In 2015, he was named Spanish Socialist Workers' Party's candidate for the Community of Madrid 2015 election. He returned to be a candidate for the 2016 election. Suggested by Pedro Sánchez, he was again the PSOE candidate for the 2019 election.

In October 2018, he offered himself to be the president of Madrid, in order to succeed Ángel Garrido.

In October 2021, after an agreement between major parties of the Cortes Generales, he was nominated to be the 6th Spanish Ombudsman. The Cortes Generales Joint Committee on Relations with the Ombudsman ratified the nomination on 27 October 2021 and it sent the candidacy to the Plenary for a final voting.

He is the brother of Spanish journalist Iñaki Gabilondo.

== Publications ==
- Dilthey: Vida, expresión e historia. Madrid: Editorial Cincel. 1988.
- El discurso en acción (Foucault y una ontología del presente). Barcelona: Editorial Anthropos. 1990.
- Trazos del eros: del leer, hablar y escribir. Madrid: Editorial Tecnos. 1997.
- Menos que palabras. Madrid: Alianza Editorial. 1999.
- La vuelta del otro. Diferencia, identidad y alteridad. Madrid: Trotta and UAM. 2001.
- Mortal de necesidad. Madrid: Abada. 2003.
- Alguien con quien hablar. Madrid: Editorial Aguilar. 2007.
- Contigo. Madrid: Editorial Aguilar. 2009.
- Palabras a mano. Madrid: Editorial Seix Barral. 2009.
- Sin fin. Editorial Aguilar. 2010.
- Darse a la lectura. Madrid: Editorial RBA. 2013.
- El Salto del Ángel. Palabras para comprenderse. Madrid: Aguilar. 2013.
- Por si acaso: Máximas y mínimas. Madrid: Editorial Espasa. 2014.
- Aranzueque, Gabriel, ed. (2015). Ser de palabra. El lenguaje de la Metafísica. Madrid: Gredos.
- Puntos Suspensivos. Madrid: Editorial Círculo de Tiza. 2015.

Academic offices
| Preceded by Raúl Villar Lázaro | Rector of the Autonomous University of Madrid; 2002-2009 | Succeeded by José María Sanz Martínez |
Political offices
| Preceded by Mercedes Cabrera | Minister of Education; 2009-2011 | Succeeded by José Ignacio Wert |
| Preceded by Francisco Fernández Marugán (acting) | Ombudsman of Spain; 2021-present | Incumbent |
Party political offices
| Preceded by José Manuel Franco | Leader of the Socialist Group in the Assembly of Madrid; 2015–2021 | Succeeded by Hana Jalloul |
