= Argamasilla de Calatrava =

- Municipality
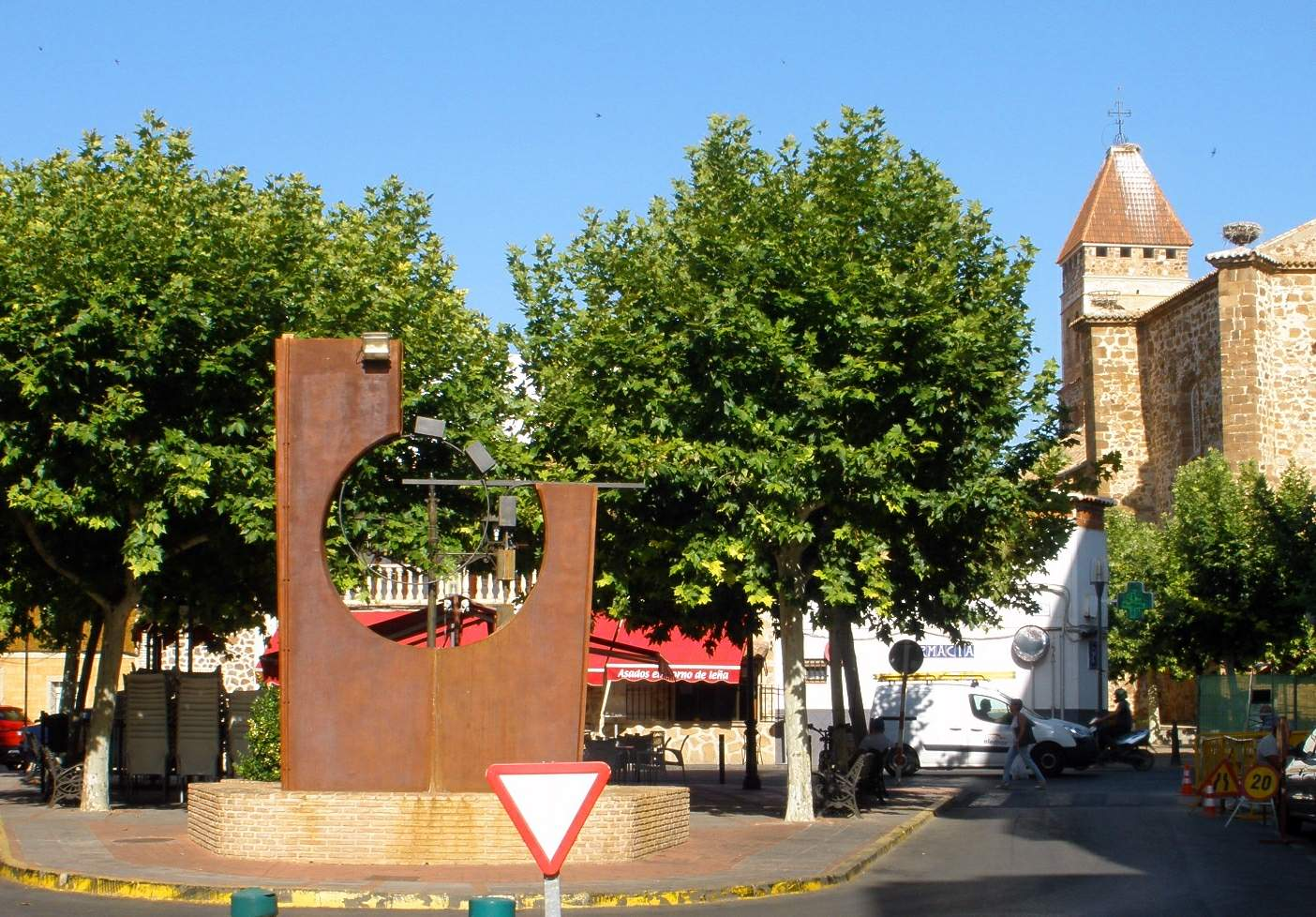
- View of Argamasilla de Calatrava

- Coat of arms

- Location within Spain
- Coordinates: 38°43′38.2″N 4°04′42.2″W
- Country: Spain
- A. Community: Castilla-La Mancha
- Province: Ciudad Real

Government
  - Mayor: Jesús Manuel Ruiz

Area
  - Total: 165.9 km^{2} (64.1 sq mi)

Population (January 1, 2021)
  - Total: 5,853
  - Density: 35.28/km^{2} (91.4/sq mi)
- Time zone: UTC+01:00 (CET)
- Postal code: 13440
- Area code: 13020
- Website: Official website

Argamasilla de Calatrava is a municipality in the Province of Ciudad Real, Castile-La Mancha, Spain. It has a population of 5,408.

== See also ==
- Argamasilla de Alba
