= First government of Isabel Díaz Ayuso =

1st government of Isabel Díaz Ayuso
- 12th Government of the Community of Madrid
- 2019–2021
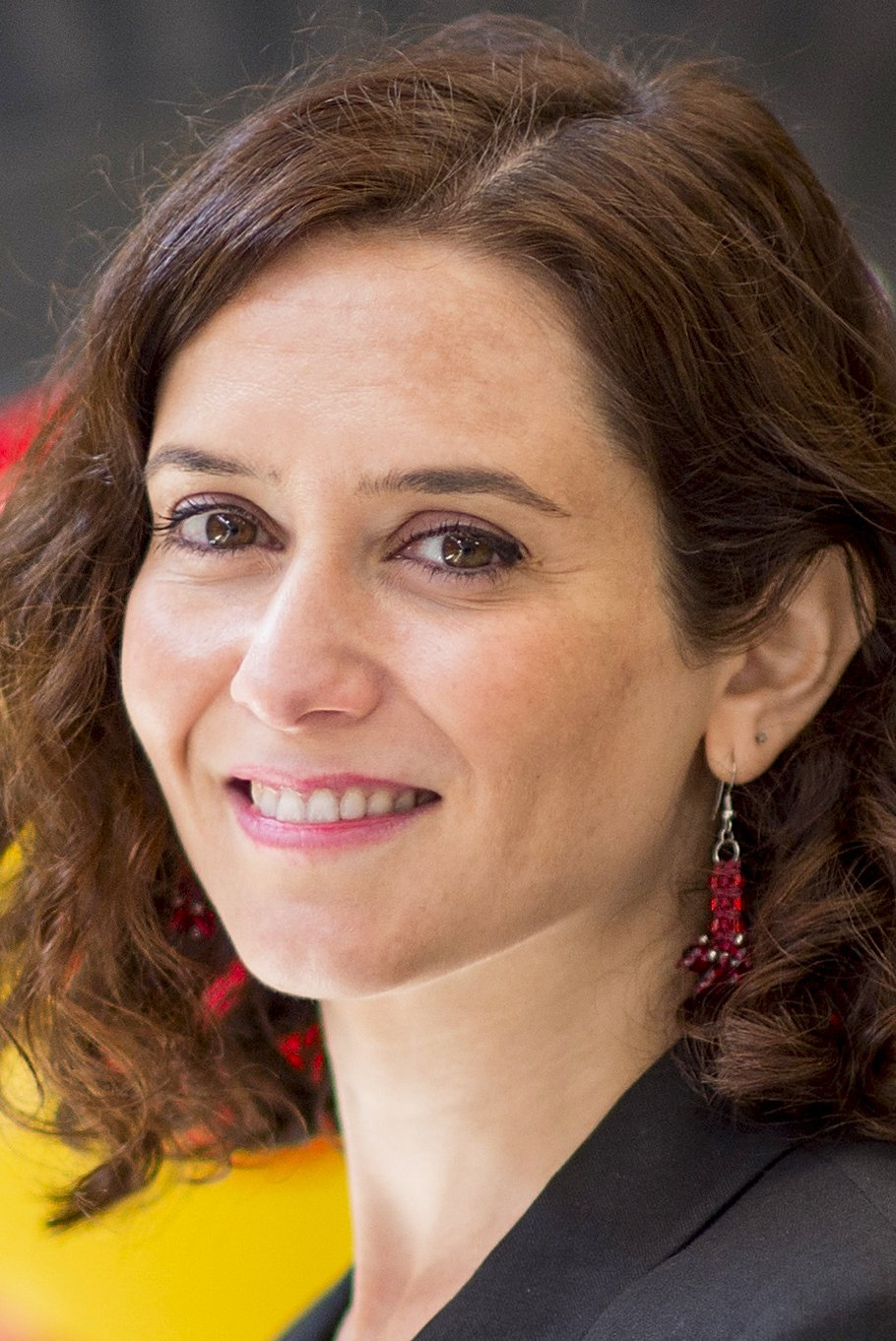
- Isabel Díaz Ayuso in April 2019.
- Date formed: 20 August 2019
- Date dissolved: 21 June 2021

People and organisations
- Monarch: Felipe VI
- President: Isabel Díaz Ayuso
- Vice President: Ignacio Aguado (2019–2021)
- No. of ministers: 13 (Note: Does not include the President.)
- Total no. of members: 14
- Member party: PP; Cs (2019–2021)
- Status in legislature: Minority coalition government (2019–2021); Minority government (2021)
- Opposition party: PSOE
- Opposition leader: Ángel Gabilondo

History
- Election: 2019 regional election
- Outgoing election: 2021 regional election
- Legislature term: 11th Assembly
- Predecessor: Garrido
- Successor: Ayuso II

The first government of Isabel Díaz Ayuso was formed on 20 August 2019, following the latter's election as President of the Community of Madrid by the Assembly of Madrid on 14 August and her swearing-in on 19 August, as a result of the People's Party (PP) and Citizens (Cs) being able to muster a majority of seats in the Assembly with external support from Vox following the 2019 Madrilenian regional election. It succeeded the Garrido government and was the Government of the Community of Madrid from 20 August 2019 to 21 June 2021, a total of 671 days, or 1 year, 10 months and 1 day.

Until 2021, the cabinet comprised members of the PP and Cs, as well as a number of independents proposed by both parties, to become the first coalition government to be formed in the region. On 10 March 2021, regional president Ayuso expelled all Cs members from the cabinet after the regional branch of the party in the Region of Murcia had pledged to bring down the PP government there through a motion of no confidence with the Spanish Socialist Workers' Party (PSOE). It was automatically dismissed on 5 May 2021 as a consequence of the 2021 regional election, but remained in acting capacity until the next government was sworn in.

== Investiture ==
Investiture; Isabel Díaz Ayuso (PP)
| Ballot → | 14 August 2019 |
| Required majority → | 67 out of 132 |
| Yes: • PP (30); • Cs (26); • Vox (12) | 68 / 132 |
| No: • PSOE (37); • Más Madrid (20); • Podemos–IU (7) | 64 / 132 |
| Abstentions | 0 / 132 |
| Absentees | 0 / 132 |

== Cabinet changes ==
Ayuso's first government saw a number of cabinet changes during its tenure:

- On 2 October 2020, Alberto Reyero announced his resignation as Minister of Social Policy, Family, Equality and Natality, in a "meditated" decision, which was largely to his frequent clashes with the Health minister, Enrique Ruiz Escudero, and the regional president Díaz Ayuso (both PP members) over their management of long-term care facilities during the COVID-19 pandemic in the Community of Madrid.
- On 10 March 2021, Ayuso expelled all six Cs members from her cabinet and announced a snap regional election for 4 May, citing "concerns" over an alleged veiled attempt to bring her down through a joint motion of no confidence of Cs with the Spanish Socialist Workers' Party (PSOE), which the former denied.

== Council of Government ==
The Council of Government is structured into the offices for the president, the vice president and 13 ministries.

← Ayuso I Government → (20 August 2019 – 21 June 2021)
| Portfolio | Name | Party | Took office | Left office | Ref. |
| President | Isabel Díaz Ayuso | PP | 17 August 2019 | 19 June 2021 | |
| Vice President, Minister of Sports and Transparency and Spokesperson of the Government | Ignacio Aguado | Cs | 20 August 2019 | 11 March 2021 | |
| Minister of the Presidency | Eugenia Carballedo | PP | 20 August 2019 | 8 June 2021 | |
| Minister of Justice, Interior and Victims | Enrique López | PP (Ind.) | 20 August 2019 | 21 June 2021 | |
| Minister of Finance and Civil Service | Javier Fernández-Lasquetty | PP | 20 August 2019 | 21 June 2021 | |
| Minister of Economy, Employment and Competitiveness | Manuel Giménez Rasero | Cs (Ind.) | 20 August 2019 | 11 March 2021 | |
| Minister of Housing and Local Administration | David Pérez García | PP | 20 August 2019 | 21 June 2021 | |
| Minister of the Environment, Territory Planning and Sustainability | Paloma Martín | PP | 20 August 2019 | 21 June 2021 | |
| Minister of Health | Enrique Ruiz Escudero | PP | 20 August 2019 | 21 June 2021 | |
| Minister of Social Policies, Families, Equality and Natality | Alberto Reyero | Cs | 20 August 2019 | 6 October 2020 | |
| Minister of Transport, Mobility and Infrastructures | Ángel Garrido | Cs | 20 August 2019 | 11 March 2021 | |
| Minister of Education and Youth | Enrique Ossorio | PP | 20 August 2019 | 21 June 2021 | |
| Minister of Science, Universities and Innovation | Eduardo Sicilia | Cs (Ind.) | 20 August 2019 | 11 March 2021 | |
| Minister of Culture and Tourism | Marta Rivera de la Cruz | Cs | 20 August 2019 | 11 March 2021 | |
=== Changes October 2020 ===
| Portfolio | Name | Party | Took office | Left office | Ref. |
| Minister of Social Policies, Families, Equality and Natality | Javier Luengo | Cs | 6 October 2020 | 11 March 2021 | |
=== Changes March 2021 ===
| Portfolio | Name | Party | Took office | Left office | Ref. |
| ~~Vice President~~ | Discontinued on 11 March 2021 upon the officeholder's dismissal. | | | | |
| Minister of Sports and Transparency | Eugenia Carballedo served as surrogate from 11 March to 21 June 2021. | | | | |
| Spokesperson of the Government | Enrique Ossorio served as surrogate from 11 March to 21 June 2021. | | | | |
| Minister of Economy, Employment and Competitiveness | Javier Fernández-Lasquetty served as surrogate from 11 March to 21 June 2021. | | | | |
| Minister of Social Policies, Families, Equality and Natality | Enrique Ruiz Escudero served as surrogate from 11 March to 21 June 2021. | | | | |
| Minister of Transport, Mobility and Infrastructures | David Pérez García served as surrogate from 11 March to 21 June 2021. | | | | |
| Minister of Science, Universities and Innovation | Enrique Ossorio served as surrogate from 11 March to 21 June 2021. | | | | |
| Minister of Culture and Tourism | Enrique Ossorio served as surrogate from 11 March to 21 June 2021. | | | | |
=== Changes June 2021 ===
| Portfolio | Name | Party | Took office | Left office | Ref. |
| Minister of the Presidency | Enrique Ossorio served as surrogate from 8 to 21 June 2021. | | | | |

== Notes ==
| Preceded by Garrido | Government of the Community of Madrid; 2019–2021 | Succeeded by Ayuso II |
