= Government of Isabel Díaz Ayuso =

Government of Isabel Díaz Ayuso may refer to:

- First government of Isabel Díaz Ayuso (2019–2021)
- Second government of Isabel Díaz Ayuso (2021–2023)
- Third government of Isabel Díaz Ayuso (2023–present)
