= Second government of Isabel Díaz Ayuso =

2nd government of Isabel Díaz Ayuso
- 13th Government of the Community of Madrid
- 2021–2023
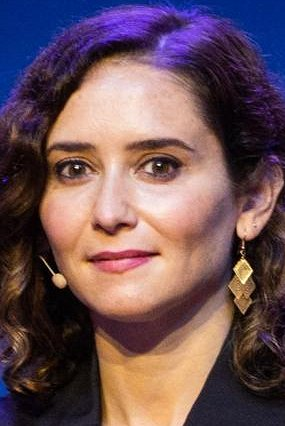
- Isabel Díaz Ayuso in October 2021.
- Date formed: 21 June 2021
- Date dissolved: 23 June 2023

People and organisations
- Monarch: Felipe VI
- President: Isabel Díaz Ayuso
- No. of ministers: 9 (Note: Does not include the President.)
- Total no. of members: 9
- Member party: PP
- Status in legislature: Minority government
- Opposition party: Más Madrid
- Opposition leader: Mónica García

History
- Election: 2021 regional election
- Legislature term: 12th Assembly
- Predecessor: Ayuso I
- Successor: Ayuso III

The second government of Isabel Díaz Ayuso was formed on 21 June 2021, following the latter's reelection as President of the Community of Madrid by the Assembly of Madrid on 18 June and her swearing-in on the next day, as a result of the People's Party (PP) emerging as the largest parliamentary force at the 2021 Madrilenian regional election. It succeeded the first Ayuso government and was the Government of the Community of Madrid from 21 June 2021 to 23 June 2023, a total of 732 days, or 2 years and 2 days.

The cabinet comprised members of the PP and a number of independents.

== Investiture ==
Investiture; Isabel Díaz Ayuso (PP)
Ballot →	18 June 2021
Required majority →	69 out of 136
Yes: • PP (65); • Vox (12)	77 / 136
No: • Más Madrid (24); • PSOE (24); • Podemos–IU (9)	57 / 136
Abstentions	0 / 136
Absentees: • Vox (1); • Podemos–IU (1)	2 / 136

== Council of Government ==
The Council of Government is structured into the office for the president and nine ministries.

← Ayuso II Government → (21 June 2021 – 23 June 2023)
Portfolio	Name	Party	Took office	Left office	Ref.
President	Isabel Díaz Ayuso	PP	19 June 2021	23 June 2023	
Minister of the Presidency, Justice and Interior	Enrique López	PP (Ind.)	21 June 2021	23 June 2023	
Minister of Education, Universities, Science and Spokesperson	Enrique Ossorio	PP	21 June 2021	16 June 2022	
Minister of the Environment, Housing and Agriculture	Paloma Martín	PP	21 June 2021	23 June 2023	
Minister of Economy, Finance and Employment	Javier Fernández-Lasquetty	PP	21 June 2021	23 June 2023	
Minister of Family, Youth and Social Policy	Concepción Dancausa	PP	21 June 2021	23 June 2023	
Minister of Local Administration and Digitalization	Carlos Izquierdo Torres	PP	21 June 2021	23 June 2023	
Minister of Health	Enrique Ruiz Escudero	PP	21 June 2021	23 June 2023	
Minister of Transport and Infrastructures	David Pérez García	PP	21 June 2021	23 June 2023	
Minister of Culture, Tourism and Sports	Marta Rivera de la Cruz	PP (Ind.)	21 June 2021	23 June 2023	
=== Changes June 2022 ===
Portfolio	Name	Party	Took office	Left office	Ref.
Vice President, Minister of Education and Universities	Enrique Ossorio	PP	16 June 2022	23 June 2023	

== Departmental structure ==
Isabel Díaz Ayuso's second government was organised into several superior and governing units, whose number, powers and hierarchical structure varied depending on the ministerial department.

Unit/body rank

- (■) Deputy minister
- (■) Director-general

Office (Original name)	Portrait	Name	Took office	Left office	Alliance/party	Ref.
=== Presidency ===
Presidency (Presidencia de la Comunidad)		Isabel Díaz Ayuso	19 June 2021	23 June 2023	PP	
=== Vice Presidency, Ministry of Education and Universities ===
Vice Presidency, Ministry of Education and Universities (Vicepresidencia, Consejería de Educación y Universidades)		Enrique Ossorio	16 June 2022	23 June 2023	PP	
=== Ministry of the Presidency, Justice and Interior ===
Ministry of the Presidency, Justice and Interior (Consejería de Presidencia, Justicia e Interior)		Enrique López	21 June 2021	23 June 2023	PP (Independent)	
=== Ministry of Education, Universities, Science and Spokesperson ===
Ministry of Education, Universities, Science and Spokesperson (Consejería de Educación, Universidades, Ciencia y Portavocía)		Enrique Ossorio	21 June 2021	16 June 2022	PP	
=== Ministry of the Environment, Housing and Agriculture ===
Ministry of the Environment, Housing and Agriculture (Consejería de Medio Ambiente, Vivienda y Agricultura)		Paloma Martín	21 June 2021	23 June 2023	PP	
=== Ministry of Economy, Finance and Employment ===
Ministry of Economy, Finance and Employment (Consejería de Economía, Hacienda y Empleo)		Javier Fernández-Lasquetty	21 June 2021	23 June 2023	PP	
=== Ministry of Family, Youth and Social Policy ===
Ministry of Family, Youth and Social Policy (Consejería de Familia, Juventud y Política Social)		Concepción Dancausa	21 June 2021	23 June 2023	PP	
=== Ministry of Local Administration and Digitalization ===
Ministry of Local Administration and Digitalization (Consejería de Administración Local y Digitalización)		Carlos Izquierdo Torres	21 June 2021	23 June 2023	PP	
=== Ministry of Health ===
Ministry of Health (Consejería de Sanidad)		Enrique Ruiz Escudero	21 June 2021	23 June 2023	PP	
=== Ministry of Transport and Infrastructures ===
Ministry of Transport and Infrastructures (Consejería de Transportes e Infraestructuras)		David Pérez García	21 June 2021	23 June 2023	PP	
=== Ministry of Culture, Tourism and Sports ===
Ministry of Culture, Tourism and Sports (Consejería de Cultura, Turismo y Deporte)		Marta Rivera de la Cruz	21 June 2021	23 June 2023	PP (Independent)	

== Notes ==
Preceded by Ayuso I	Government of the Community of Madrid; 2021–2023	Succeeded by Ayuso III
