= COVID-19 pandemic in the Community of Madrid =

Ongoing COVID-19 viral pandemic in the Community of Madrid

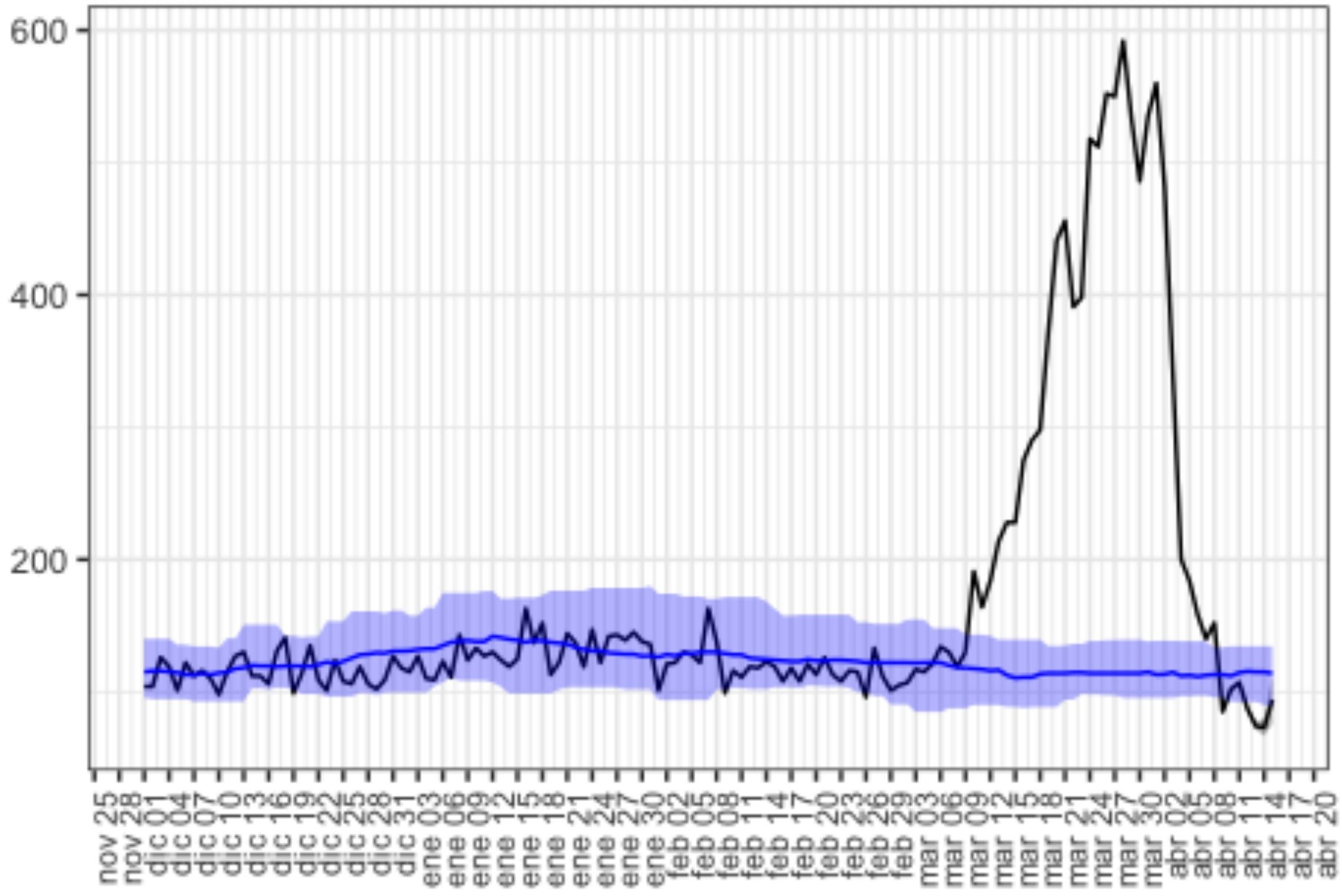
- Daily deaths in Madrid, 25 November 2019 – 6 April 2020. Recent dates are incomplete.

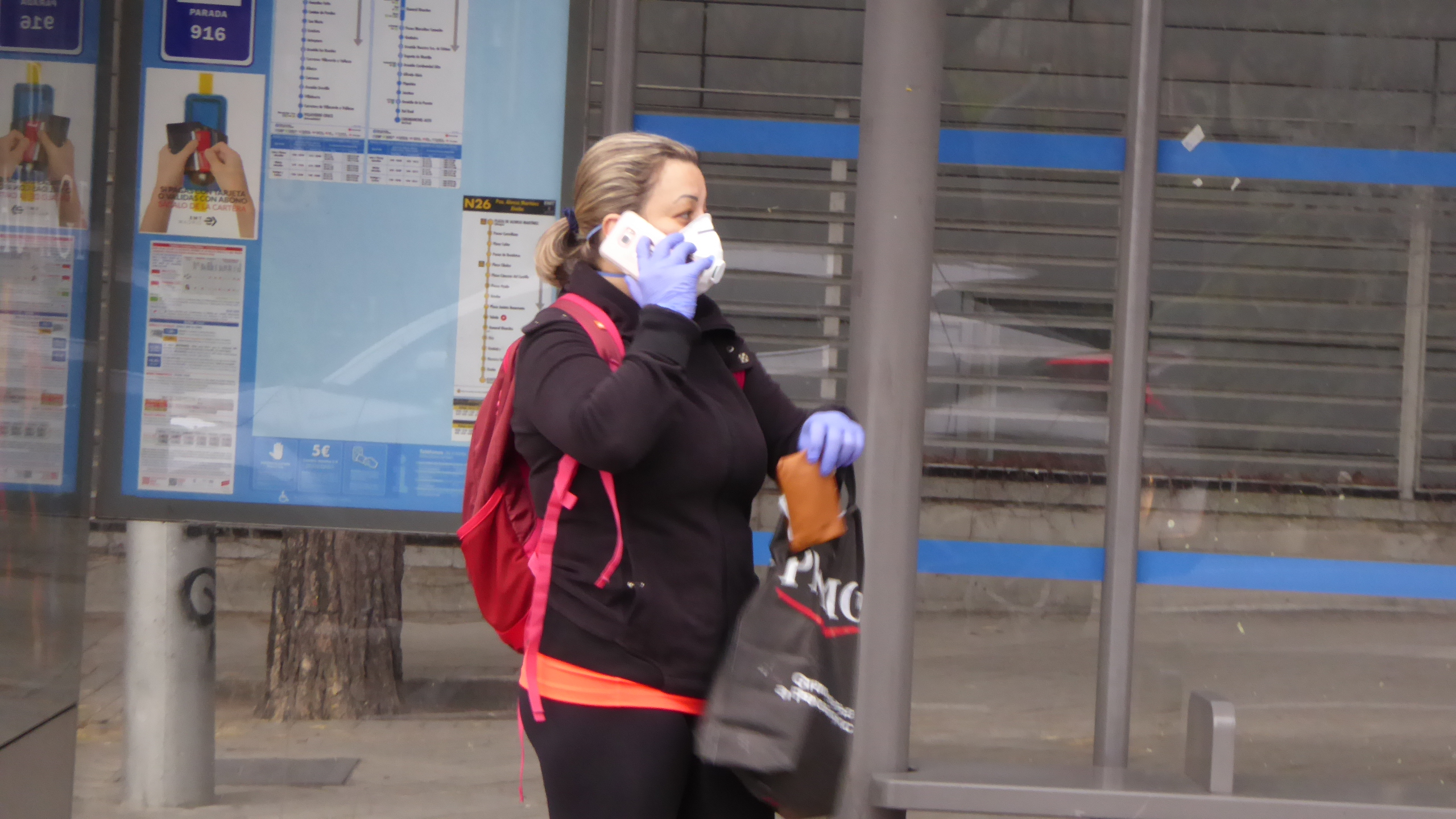
- Disease: COVID-19
- Pathogen: SARS-CoV-2
- Location: Community of Madrid
- Confirmed cases: 40,469 (as of 6 April 2020)
- Recovered: 18,410 (as of 6 April 2020)
- Deaths: 5,371 (as of 6 April 2020)

The COVID-19 pandemic in Spain had its first case in the Community of Madrid on 25 February 2020.

== Timeline ==
The pandemic was first confirmed to have spread to the region on 25 February 2020 with the positive result of a 24-year-old male who had been in Italy. By the time the pandemic started the region had 540 available ICUs and roughly 14,000 hospital beds.

On 9 March 2020, the Government of the Community of Madrid approved extraordinary measures, including the cancellation (to be enforced from 11 March onwards) of all in-person classes in the Autonomous community of Madrid at all educational levels for an initial period of 15 days, until 26 March, encouraging online lessons instead if possible.

On 13 March 2020 the Government of the Community of Madrid decreed the shutting down of bars, restaurants and "non-alimentary" shops (only allowing the opening of supermarkets and pharmacies). On 14 March the country-wide state of alarm for an initial period of 15 days was declared in accordance with Article 116.2 of the Spanish constitution.

On 12 March, the hiring of Antonio Burgueño as advisor was announced by the regional administration. Burgueño had previously served as Director-General for Hospitals under Manuel Lamela, Juan José Güemes and Javier Fernández-Lasquetty, and had left office after Justice blocked the latter's attempt to further privatize the health system.

During the height of the crisis (from mid March to mid April) the regional administration conducted a triage, denying the transfer to the public hospital network of old people in dire conditions from the nursing homes, yet it allowed the transfer of ill-people in possession of a private health insurance, despite the regional health minister Enrique Ruiz Escudero had assumed command over the private health care system on March 12.

On 19 March the regional minister for Social Policies, Alberto Reyero, addressed a petition to the Government of Spain, asking for the intervention of the Military Emergencies Unit (UME) in the nursing homes. He was immediately disauthorized by Isabel Díaz Ayuso. Reyero was removed from the political management of the nursing homes on 26 March. Then, the regional government entrusted to Encarnación Burgueño—the daughter of Antonio Burgueño and owner of Cardio Líder (a ghost company)—the managing of the nursing home's crisis, enforcing the so-called "Operación Bicho" from 26 March onwards, attempting to provide care to the nearly 50,000 old folks in the nursing homes. 12 days later, on 6 April (the same day the information about the hiring of Burgueño Jr. was made public), the Operación Bicho was abruptly aborted. More than 3,000 old people had died during that period. All was fine for Burgueño by 4 April, as she reportedly wrote to a close collaborator "we already have inspected 8,700 grandpas". Do you know what that means? The work you have performed? Just in a week?... No way! If we keep doing this, we are becoming kings and masters of the social-health management in Madrid autonomous community. You are going to realize my dream, working in the social-health sector. Having my own company."

On 31 March 2020, two weeks after the death of 19 elderly people in a care home Monte Hermoso became public, the regional administration decided to intervene 8 private retirement homes (including the former), overwhelmed by the deadly advance of the pandemic, sometimes hidden by the companies operating the old folks' homes.

The regional legislature, the Assembly of Madrid, was kept closed for more than a month, until sessions were resumed on 14 April. The government coalition between PP and Ciudadanos showed discrepancies on the handling of the management of the retirement homes. From 8 March to 14 April, almost 5,000 older people died in nursing homes in the region (781 confirmed cases and 4,172 with compatible symptoms).

On 7 May 2020, the director-general of public health Yolanda Fuentes resigned, apparently in protest at the regional government's decision to request a loosening of the lockdown restrictions.

On 1 June 2020, Alberto Reyero (Ciudadanos), regional minister responsible for nursing homes at the height of the health crisis, declared he had asked for three times the regional ministry of Health (managed by Enrique Ruiz Escudero, PP) to allow the transfer of old people to hospitals (22 and 31 March, 11 April), to no success.

On 18 September, following an increase in the number of cases in the Community, the Autonomous Government decided to apply movement restrictions in various areas of the territory, especially in the south. These measures were not welcomed by the citizens of the restricted areas, calling them unfair and even racist. Neighbourhood associations and other political personalities called for demonstrations denouncing the lack of investment and calling for the resignation of the community presidency

On 26 September, the spokesperson for the COVID-19 group of the Community of Madrid, former head of the Clinical Microbiology and Infectious Diseases Service of the Gregorio Marañón University General Hospital Emilio Bouza, announced his resignation two days after his appointment, claiming that "The circumstances that I have witnessed in the following two days, together with the contemplation of the simultaneous press conferences, force me to resign". On the same day, Yolanda Fuentes, former director-general of public health of the region until her resignation on May due to disagreements with the regional government, published a social media post wishing "Good luck" followed by an extract from the film Titanic, where musicians kept playing while the boat was sinking.

On 1 October, followed unsuccessful conversations between the central government and the autonomous government, the Minister of Health of Spain announced restrictions in the ten most populous cities of the region following the growing of COVID cases, which prompted a negative reaction from the Madrilenian president, that accused the national government of "usurpation of functions", but said her government would abide by the restrictions, although they would challenge them in court.

On 3 October, Alberto Reyero, the regional minister responsible for nursing homes announced his resignation, wishing "good luck and success in the task that she has ahead" to Díaz Ayuso. He also mentioned that "the unity of the institutions is the most successful way to defeat the virus", criticizing the confrontation between the regional and national administrations.

On 9 October, following unsuccessful talks and confrontation between Díaz Ayuso and PM Pedro Sánchez, the Spanish government approved a State of Alarm for the Community of Madrid.

On 20 October 2020, two health officials of the Ayuso administration (the manager of Primary Attention and the manager of Hospitals) handed in their resignation.

== Cumulative data ==
Data from Telemadrid and the Ministry of Health.

COVID-19 cases in the Community of Madrid
Date	Confirmed cases	% change	Deaths	% change	Recovered	% change
25 February 2020	1					
26 February 2020	2					
27 February 2020	4					
28 February 2020	5					
29 February 2020	8					
1 March 2020	10					
2 March 2020	29					
3 March 2020	49					
4 March 2020	70					
5 March 2020	90					
6 March 2020	137					
7 March 2020	174		4			
8 March 2020	202		8			
9 March 2020	469		8			
10 March 2020	782		21			
11 March 2020	1,024		31			
12 March 2020	1,388		56			
13 March 2020	1,990		81			
14 March 2020	2,940		86			
15 March 2020	3,544		213			
16 March 2020	4,165		213			
17 March 2020	4,871		355			
18 March 2020	5,637		390			
19 March 2020	6,777		498			
20 March 2020	7,165		628			
21 March 2020	8,921		804			
22 March 2020	9,702		1,021			
23 March 2020	10,575		1,263		2,063	
24 March 2020	12,352		1,535		2,291	
25 March 2020	14,597		1,825		3,031	
26 March 2020	17,166		2,090		3,882	
27 March 2020	19,243		2,412		5,044	
28 March 2020	21,520		2,757		6,326	
29 March 2020	22,677		3,082		7,491	
30 March 2020	24,090		3,392		8,301	
31 March 2020	27,509		3,603		9,330	
1 April 2020	29,840		3,865		10,827	
2 April 2020	32,155		4,175		12,400	
3 April 2020	34,188		4,483		13,850	
4 April 2020	36,249		4,723		15,362	
5 April 2020	37,584		4,941		16,543	
6 April 2020	38,723		5,136		17,322	
7 April 2020	40,469		5,371		18,410	
8 April 2020	42,450		5,586		19,836	
9 April 2020	43,877		5,800		21,121	
10 April 2020	44,783		5,972		22,414	
11 April 2020	45,849		6,084		23,663	
12 April 2020	46,587		6,278		24,683	
13 April 2020	47,146		6,423		25,385	
14 April 2020	48,048		6,568		26,247	
15 April 2020	49,526		6,724		27,433	
16 April 2020	50,694		6,877		28,491	
17 April 2020	51,993		7,007		29,436	
18 April 2020	52,946		7,132		30,475	
19 April 2020	54,884		7,239		31,313	
20 April 2020	56,963		7,351		31,762	
21 April 2020	57,997		7,460		32,277	
22 April 2020	59,199		7,577		33,032	
23 April 2020	60,487		7,684		33,645	
24 April 2020	61,726		7,765		34,212	
25 April 2020	62,510		7,848		34,902	
26 April 2020						
27 April 2020						
28 April 2020						
29 April 2020						
30 April 2020						
