= May 2003 Madrilenian regional election =

Election in the Spanish region of Madrid

- 25 May 2003

All 111 seats in the Assembly of Madrid 56 seats needed for a majority
- Opinion polls
- Registered: 4,443,533 ▲3.9%
- Turnout: 3,078,052 (69.3%) ▲8.4 pp
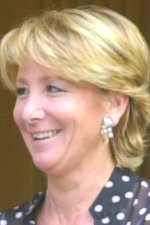

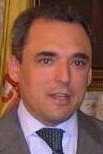

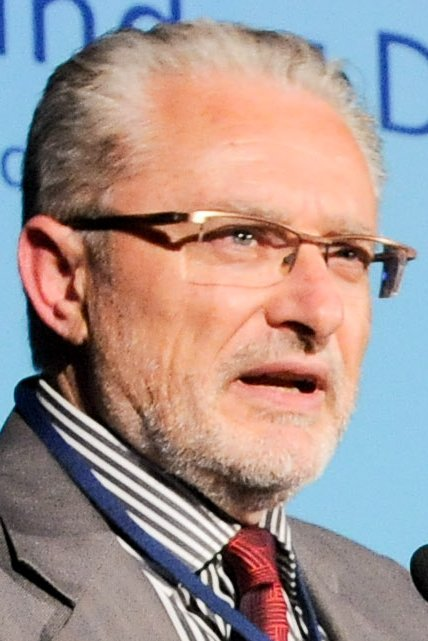
	First party	Second party	Third party
Leader	Esperanza Aguirre	Rafael Simancas	Fausto Fernández
Party	PP	PSOE	IUCM
Leader since	16 October 2002	26 November 2000	11 March 2002
Last election	55 seats, 51.1%	39 seats, 36.4%	8 seats, 7.7%
Seats won	55	47	9
Seat change	0	▲8	▲1
Popular vote	1,429,890	1,225,390	235,428
Percentage	46.7%	40.0%	7.7%
Swing	▼4.4 pp	▲3.6 pp	0.0 pp
President before election
Alberto Ruiz-Gallardón
PP
President after election
No government formed
and fresh election called.
Alberto Ruiz-Gallardón
remains acting President

A regional election was held in the Community of Madrid on 25 May 2003 to elect the 6th Assembly of the autonomous community. All 111 seats in the Assembly were up for election. It was held concurrently with regional elections in twelve other autonomous communities and local elections all across Spain.

As a result of the election, the People's Party (PP) lost its absolute majority in the Assembly, thus leaving the way open for a coalition government be formed between the Spanish Socialist Workers' Party (PSOE) and United Left (IU). A major political scandal ensued after two PSOE deputies—Eduardo Tamayo and María Teresa Sáez—broke party discipline and refused to support PSOE regional leader Rafael Simancas's investiture. The prospective PSOE–IU alliance found itself commanding 54 seats against the 55-strong PP, which could not bring its candidate, Esperanza Aguirre, through an investiture vote as the rebel PSOE deputies would not vote for her either. With no candidate able to obtain the required votes to become president, the regional Assembly was dissolved on 28 August 2003 and a snap election was held in October 2003.

== Background ==
The PP had replaced the PSOE in government after 12 years of Socialist rule as a result of the 1995 election. In the 1999 election, the PP, under Alberto Ruiz-Gallardón, managed to maintain their absolute majority, despite the opposition PSOE recovering lost ground. For the 2003 election, the ruling PP had switched leadership: President Ruiz-Gallardón ran as candidate for the office of Mayor of Madrid, while senator and former minister Esperanza Aguirre was selected to lead the regional list.

== Overview ==
Under the 1983 Statute of Autonomy, the Assembly of Madrid was the unicameral legislature of the homonymous autonomous community, having legislative power in devolved matters, as well as the ability to grant or withdraw confidence from a regional president. The electoral and procedural rules were supplemented by national law provisions.

=== Date ===
The term of the Assembly of Madrid expired four years after the date of its previous ordinary election, with election day being fixed for the fourth Sunday of May every four years. The election decree was required to be issued no later than 54 days before the scheduled election date and published on the following day in the Official Gazette of the Community of Madrid (BOCM). The previous election was held on 13 June 1999, setting the date for election day on the fourth Sunday of May four years later, which was 25 May 2003.

The regional president had the prerogative to dissolve the Assembly of Madrid at any given time and call a snap election, provided that no motion of no confidence was in process, no nationwide election had been called and that dissolution did not occur either during the first legislative session or during the last year of parliament before its planned expiration, nor before one year after a previous one. In the event of an investiture process failing to elect a regional president within a two-month period from the first ballot, the Assembly was to be automatically dissolved and a fresh election called. Any snap election held as a result of these circumstances did not alter the date of the chamber's next ordinary election, with elected lawmakers serving the remainder of its original four-year term.

The election to the Assembly of Madrid was officially called on 1 April 2003 with the publication of the corresponding decree in the BOCM, setting election day for 25 May and scheduling for the chamber to reconvene on 10 June.

=== Electoral system ===
Voting for the Assembly was based on universal suffrage, comprising all Spanish nationals over 18 years of age, registered in the Community of Madrid and with full political rights, provided that they had not been deprived of the right to vote by a final sentence, nor were legally incapacitated.

The Assembly of Madrid had one seat per 50,000 inhabitants or fraction above 25,000. All were elected in a single multi-member constituency—corresponding to the autonomous community's territory—using the D'Hondt method and closed-list proportional voting, with a five percent-threshold of valid votes (including blank ballots) regionally. As a result of the aforementioned allocation, the Assembly was entitled to 111 seats, based on the official population figures resulting from the latest revision of the municipal register (as of 1 January 2002).

The law did not provide for by-elections to fill vacant seats; instead, any vacancies arising after the proclamation of candidates and during the legislative term were filled by the next candidates on the party lists or, when required, by designated substitutes.

=== Outgoing parliament ===
The table below shows the composition of the parliamentary groups in the chamber at the time of the election call.

Parliamentary composition in April 2003
Groups	Parties	Legislators	
Groups	Parties	Seats	Total
People's Parliamentary Group	PP	55	55
Socialist Parliamentary Group	PSOE	39	39
United Left Parliamentary Group	IUCM	8	8

== Parties and candidates ==
The electoral law allowed for parties and federations registered in the interior ministry, alliances and groupings of electors to present lists of candidates. Parties and federations intending to form an alliance were required to inform the relevant electoral commission within 10 days of the election call, whereas groupings of electors needed to secure the signature of at least 0.5 percent of the electorate in the Community of Madrid, disallowing electors from signing for more than one list.

Below is a list of the main parties and alliances which contested the election:

Candidacy	Parties and alliances	Leading candidate	Ideology	Previous result		Gov.	Ref.
Candidacy	Parties and alliances	Leading candidate	Ideology	Vote %	Seats	Gov.	Ref.
PP	List: People's Party (PP)	Esperanza Aguirre	Conservatism; Christian democracy	51.1%	55	Yes	
PSOE	List: Spanish Socialist Workers' Party (PSOE)	Rafael Simancas	Social democracy	36.4%	39	No	
IUCM	List: United Left of the Community of Madrid (IUCM) – Communist Party of Madrid (PCM) – Revolutionary Workers' Party (POR) – Workers' Revolutionary Party–Revolutionary Left (PRT–IR)	Fausto Fernández	Socialism; Communism	7.7%	8	No	

== Opinion polls ==
The tables below list opinion polling results in reverse chronological order, showing the most recent first and using the dates when the survey fieldwork was done, as opposed to the date of publication. Where the fieldwork dates are unknown, the date of publication is given instead. The highest percentage figure in each polling survey is displayed with its background shaded in the leading party's colour. If a tie ensues, this is applied to the figures with the highest percentages. The "Lead" column on the right shows the percentage-point difference between the parties with the highest percentages in a poll.

=== Voting intention estimates ===
The table below lists weighted voting intention estimates. Refusals are generally excluded from the party vote percentages, while question wording and the treatment of "don't know" responses and those not intending to vote may vary between polling organisations. When available, seat projections determined by the polling organisations are displayed below (or in place of) the percentages in a smaller font; 56 seats were required for an absolute majority in the Assembly of Madrid (52 in the 1999 election).

Color key:

Exit poll

Polling firm/Commissioner	Fieldwork date	Sample size	Turnout	PP	PSOE	IUCM	LV	Lead
May 2003 regional election	25 May 2003	—N/a	69.3	46.7; 55	40.0; 47	7.7; 9	1.4; 0	6.7
Sigma Dos/Antena 3	25 May 2003	?	?	? 54/55	? 46/47	? 8/10	–	?
Ipsos–Eco/RTVE	25 May 2003	?	?	? 51/53	? 47/49	? 10/11	–	?
Opina/El País	18 May 2003	?	?	46.0; 55/56	40.0; 46/47	7.5; 8/9	–	6.0
Demoscopia/PP	17 May 2003	?	?	44.5– 45.5; 53/55	41.0– 42.0; 49/51	6.0– 7.0; 6/9	3.0– 4.0; 0	3.5
Sigma Dos/El Mundo	8–13 May 2003	800	?	47.8; 54/56	41.2; 47/49	7.1; 8	–	6.6
Opina/Cadena SER	11 May 2003	?	?	47.0; 56/57	38.0; 45/46	8.0; 9	–	9.0
Vox Pública/El Periódico (Note: "Comunidad Autónoma de Madrid". El Periódico de Catalunya (in Spanish). 2 May 2003. Archived from the original on 23 June 2003.)	28 Apr 2003	805	?	44.5– 45.5; 52/54	42.5– 43.5; 50/51	6.5– 7.5; 7/8	–	2.0
CIS	22 Mar–28 Apr 2003	1,190	73.2	43.6; 52	40.6; 49	8.5; 10	–	3.0
Ipsos–Eco/ABC	22–24 Apr 2003	?	?	42.9; 50/51	43.2; 50/51	8.6; 10	–	0.3
Sondaxe/La Voz de Galicia	18 Jan 2003	?	?	48.3; 50	42.2; 44	7.8; 8	–	6.1
Demoscopia/CEIM	18–25 Oct 2002	2,471	?	49.5	39.2	5.7	3.5	10.3
CIS	9 Sep–9 Oct 2002	808	70.1	47.1	37.9	7.7	–	9.2
Opina/El País	29 Sep 2002	?	?	48.0	44.0	5.5	–	4.0
Ipsos–Eco/ABC	6–13 Sep 2002	2,010	?	47.9; 50	39.2; 44	7.7; 8	–	8.7
Demoscopia/CEIM	27 Aug–10 Sep 2001	1,800	?	50.9; 54/55	37.7; 39/40	8.4; 7/8	–	13.2
Inner Line/PSOE	5 May–17 Jun 2001	2,100	?	46.0; 49	41.0; 43	10.0; 10	–	5.0
2000 general election	12 Mar 2000	—N/a	72.1	52.5 (57)	33.1 (36)	9.1 (9)	0.8 (0)	19.4
1999 regional election	13 Jun 1999	—N/a	60.9	51.1; 55	36.4; 39	7.7; 8	0.7; 0	14.7

=== Voting preferences ===
The table below lists raw, unweighted voting preferences.

Polling firm/Commissioner	Fieldwork date	Sample size	PP	PSOE	IUCM	Question	X mark	Lead
May 2003 regional election (Note: Does not include non-resident citizens.)	25 May 2003	—N/a	31.9	27.4	5.2	—N/a	29.0	4.5
CIS	22 Mar–28 Apr 2003	1,190	26.2	25.4	6.6	28.2	7.0	0.8
Sondaxe/La Voz de Galicia	18 Jan 2003	?	26.4	23.6	3.8	–	–	2.8
CIS	9 Sep–9 Oct 2002	808	25.4	24.5	6.3	26.7	11.0	0.9
2000 general election	12 Mar 2000	—N/a	38.4	24.1	6.7	—N/a	26.6	14.3
1999 regional election	13 Jun 1999	—N/a	31.0	22.1	4.7	—N/a	38.1	8.9

=== Victory preferences ===
The table below lists opinion polling on the victory preferences for each party in the event of a regional election taking place.

Polling firm/Commissioner	Fieldwork date	Sample size	PP	PSOE	IUCM	Other/ None	Question	Lead
Opina/Cadena SER	11 May 2003	?	36.2	29.6	5.1	5.5	23.6	6.6
CIS	22 Mar–28 Apr 2003	1,190	34.2	34.5	7.9	6.2	17.1	0.3
Ipsos–Eco/ABC	22–24 Apr 2003	?	35.3	38.3	7.3	2.8	16.3	3.0

=== Victory likelihood ===
The table below lists opinion polling on the perceived likelihood of victory for each party in the event of a regional election taking place.

Polling firm/Commissioner	Fieldwork date	Sample size	PP	PSOE	IUCM	Other/ None	Question	Lead
Opina/Cadena SER	11 May 2003	?	49.4	19.4	0.6	0.6	29.9	30.0
CIS	22 Mar–28 Apr 2003	1,190	42.4	26.9	0.0	0.3	30.6	15.5
Ipsos–Eco/ABC	22–24 Apr 2003	?	49.9	28.9	–	1.6	19.6	21.0
Ipsos–Eco/ABC	6–13 Sep 2002	2,010	56.3	13.7	–	0.9	29.2	42.6

=== Preferred President ===
The table below lists opinion polling on leader preferences to become president of the Community of Madrid.

Polling firm/Commissioner	Fieldwork date	Sample size				Other/ None/ Not care	Question	Lead
Polling firm/Commissioner	Fieldwork date	Sample size	Aguirre PP	Simancas PSOE	Fernández IUCM	Other/ None/ Not care	Question	Lead
Opina/Cadena SER	11 May 2003	?	34.0	24.1	3.7	2.2	36.1	9.9
Vox Pública/El Periódico	28 Apr 2003	805	36.0	25.8	–	38.2		10.2
CIS	22 Mar–28 Apr 2003	1,190	23.0	23.9	3.9	15.5	33.5	0.9

=== Predicted President ===
The table below lists opinion polling on the perceived likelihood for each leader to become president.

Polling firm/Commissioner	Fieldwork date	Sample size				Other/ None/ Not care	Question	Lead
Polling firm/Commissioner	Fieldwork date	Sample size	Aguirre PP	Simancas PSOE	Fernández IUCM	Other/ None/ Not care	Question	Lead
Opina/Cadena SER	11 May 2003	?	43.4	19.2	0.8	1.0	35.5	24.2
Vox Pública/El Periódico	28 Apr 2003	805	43.5	20.7	–	35.8		22.8

== Results ==
=== Overall ===
← Summary of the 25 May 2003 Assembly of Madrid election results →
Parties and alliances	Popular vote			Seats	
Parties and alliances	Votes	%	±pp	Total	+/−
People's Party (PP)	1,429,890	46.67	−4.40	55	±0
Spanish Socialist Workers' Party (PSOE)	1,225,390	39.99	+3.56	47	+8
United Left of the Community of Madrid (IUCM)	235,428	7.68	−0.01	9	+1
The Greens (LV)	42,322	1.38	+0.69	0	±0
The Greens of the Community of Madrid (LVCM)	28,207	0.92	New	0	±0
Democratic and Social Centre (CDS)	6,696	0.22	−0.10	0	±0
The Phalanx (FE)	4,047	0.13	−0.02	0	±0
Family and Life Party (PFyV)	3,994	0.13	New	0	±0
Spanish Democratic Party (PADE)	3,533	0.12	+0.02	0	±0
National Democracy (DN)	3,285	0.11	New	0	±0
Communist Party of the Peoples of Spain (PCPE)	2,491	0.08	−0.04	0	±0
Independent Spanish Phalanx–Phalanx 2000 (FEI–FE 2000)	2,448	0.08	−0.01	0	±0
Republican Left (IR)	2,342	0.08	New	0	±0
Party Association of Widows and Legal Wives (PAVIEL)	2,210	0.07	New	0	±0
Humanist Party (PH)	2,172	0.07	−0.03	0	±0
Madrilenian Independent Regional Party (PRIM)	2,096	0.07	−0.01	0	±0
Citizen Unity (UC)	1,943	0.06	−0.01	0	±0
Commoners' Land–Castilian Nationalist Party (TC–PNC)	1,776	0.06	New	0	±0
Another Democracy is Possible (ODeP)	1,749	0.06	New	0	±0
Castilian Left (IzCa)	1,119	0.04	New	0	±0
Blank ballots	60,942	1.99	−0.11		
Total	3,064,080			111	+9
Valid votes	3,064,080	99.55	+0.04		
Invalid votes	13,972	0.45	−0.04		
Votes cast / turnout	3,078,052	69.27	+8.39		
Abstentions	1,365,481	30.73	−8.39		
Registered voters	4,443,533				

Popular vote
PP	46.67%
PSOE	39.99%
IUCM	7.68%
LV	1.38%
Others	2.29%
Blank ballots	1.99%

Seats
PP	49.55%
PSOE	42.34%
IUCM	8.11%

=== Elected legislators ===
The following table lists the elected legislators sorted by order of election:

Elected legislators
#	Name	List
1	Esperanza Aguirre Gil de Biedma	PP
2	Rafael Simancas Simancas	PSOE
3	Miguel Ángel Villanueva González ^{(es)}	PP
4	Inés Alberdi Alonso	PSOE
5	Juan José Güemes Barrios	PP
6	Pedro Feliciano Sabando Suárez ^{(es)}	PSOE
7	Concepción Dancausa Treviño ^{(es)}	PP
8	Ruth Porta Cantoni	PSOE
9	Beatriz Elorriaga Pisarik ^{(es)}	PP
10	Carlos Westendorp Cabeza	PSOE
11	Alberto López Viejo ^{(es)}	PP
12	Fausto Fernández Díaz ^{(es)}	IUCM
13	Antonio Germán Beteta Barreda ^{(es)}	PP
14	María Helena Almazán Vicario	PSOE
15	Francisco José Granados Lerena	PP
16	Francisco Cabaco López	PSOE
17	Luis Eduardo Cortés Muñoz ^{(es)}	PP
18	María Encarnación Moya Nieto	PSOE
19	Rosa María Posada Chapado	PP
20	José Antonio Díaz Martínez	PSOE
21	María Paloma Adrados Gautier	PP
22	María Soledad Mestre García	PSOE
23	Luis Peral Guerra	PP
24	Eduardo Cuenca Cañizares	IUCM
25	José Manuel Franco Pardo	PSOE
26	María Carmen Álvarez-Arenas Cisneros	PP
27	José Ignacio Echániz	PP
28	María Ángeles Martínez Herrando	PSOE
29	Luis Manuel Partida Brunete	PP
30	Eduardo Tamayo Barrena ^{(es)}	PSOE
31	María Gador Ongil Cores ^{(es)}	PP
32	María Isabel Manzano Martínez	PSOE
33	José Ignacio Echeverría Echániz	PP
34	José Carmelo Cepeda García	PSOE
35	Juan Van-Halen Acedo	PP
36	Miguel Ángel Reneses González Solares ^{(es)}	IUCM
37	Antonio Chazarra Montiel	PSOE
38	Fernando Martínez Vidal	PP
39	Ana María Arroyo Veneroso	PSOE
40	María Cristina Cifuentes Cuencas	PP
41	Juan Soler-Espiauba Gallo ^{(es)}	PP
42	Modesto Nolla Estrada ^{(d)}	PSOE
43	Pedro Muñoz Abrines	PP
44	Francisco Hernández Ballesteros	PSOE
45	Paloma Martín Martín	PP
46	Lucila María Corral Ruiz	PSOE
47	Sylvia Enseñat de Carlos	PP
48	Caridad García Álvarez	IUCM
49	Francisco Contreras Lorenzo	PSOE
50	Luis del Olmo Flórez ^{(d)}	PP
51	Jorge Gómez Moreno	PSOE
52	Regino García-Badell Arias	PP
53	María Patrocinio las Heras Pinilla	PSOE
54	José María Federico Corral	PP
55	María Isabel Martínez-Cubells Yraola	PP
56	Francisco Javier Gómez Gómez	PSOE
57	Álvaro Ramón Renedo Sedano	PP
58	Óscar José Monterrubio Rodríguez	PSOE
59	Elena de Utrilla Palombi	PP
60	Carmen García Rojas	PSOE
61	Margarita María Ferré Luparia ^{(d)}	IUCM
62	Francisco Javier Rodríguez Rodríguez ^{(es)}	PP
63	Eustaquio Giménez Molero	PSOE
64	Jesús Fermosel Díaz ^{(es)}	PP
65	Andrés Rojo Cubero	PSOE
66	David Pérez García	PP
67	Alicia Acebes Carabaño	PSOE
68	Benjamín Martín Vasco	PP
69	María Carmen Rodríguez Flores	PP
70	Eduardo Sánchez Gatell	PSOE
71	Álvaro Moraga Valiente	PP
72	Rafael Gómez Montoya ^{(es)}	PSOE
73	Jorge García Castaño ^{(es)}	IUCM
74	Isabel Gema González González ^{(fr)}	PP
75	María Paz Martín Lozano	PSOE
76	Concepción Lostau Martínez	PP
77	Marcos Sanz Agüero ^{(es)}	PSOE
78	Francisco de Borja Sarasola Jáudenes ^{(es)}	PP
79	Antonio Fernández Gordillo	PSOE
80	Pilar Busó Borús ^{(d)}	PP
81	María Maravillas Martínez Doncel	PSOE
82	Laura de Esteban Martín ^{(ca)}	PP
83	Eduardo Oficialdegui Alonso de Celada	PP
84	Alejandro Fernández Martín	PSOE
85	Luis Suárez Machota	IUCM
86	Sonsoles Trinidad Aboín Aboín ^{(d)}	PP
87	Juan Antonio Ruiz Castillo	PSOE
88	Colomán Trabado Pérez	PP
89	María Rosa de la Rosa Ignacio	PSOE
90	Jesús Adriano Valverde Bocanegra	PP
91	Enrique Echegoyen Vera	PSOE
92	María Isabel Redondo Alcaide	PP
93	Adolfo Piñedo Simal ^{(es)}	PSOE
94	Pablo Morillo Casals	PP
95	María Dolores Rodríguez Gabucio	PSOE
96	María Pilar Liébana Montijano ^{(d)}	PP
97	José Guillermo Fernando Marín Calvo	IUCM
98	Carlos Clemente Aguado	PP
99	María Antonia García Fernández	PSOE
100	Oliva Cristina García Robredo	PP
101	Francisco Garrido Hernández	PSOE
102	Jacobo Ramón Beltrán Pedreira ^{(ca)}	PP
103	José Luis García Sánchez	PSOE
104	Federico Jiménez de Parga Maseda	PP
105	Adolfo Navarro Muñoz	PSOE
106	Francisco de Borja Carabante Muntada	PP
107	María Teresa Sáez Laguna	PSOE
108	José Cabrera Orellana	PP
109	María de los Reyes Montiel Mesa ^{(es)}	IUCM
110	Pedro García-Blanco Saceda	PSOE
111	Pablo Abejas Juárez	PP

== Aftermath ==
=== Reactions ===
Election results saw the People's Party (PP) remaining the largest political party but one seat short of an overall majority, with the combined left-wing bloc of the Spanish Socialist Workers' Party (PSOE) and United Left (IU) securing a combined 56 out of 111 seats. Both left-wing parties were favourable to an alliance that ousted the PP from the regional government, immediately starting negotiations to secure the investiture of regional PSOE leader Rafael Simancas as new president. Talks through late May and early June were positive, with the issue of IU joining a coalition government with the PSOE being discussed.

=== Tamayazo scandal ===
Upon the Assembly's reconvening on 10 June, the unexpected absence of two PSOE deputies—Eduardo Tamayo and María Teresa Sáez, aligned to the internal "grassroots reformers" faction (English for renovadores por la base)—resulted in the PP outnumbering the left-wing bloc 55 to 54, leading to the election of a PP speaker as well as a PP-leaning bureau. Both Tamayo and Sáez attributed their action (which resulted in their party expelling them and demanding that they hand over their seats) to disagreements with the PSOE–IU alliance to rule the region. The PSOE and IU pointed at such move being motivated out of "economic and urban interests" instead, and hinted at an alleged bribing aimed at preventing a left-wing government in Madrid.

Election of the President of the Assembly of Madrid
Ballot →	10 June 2003		10 June 2003	
Required majority →	56 out of 111		Simple	
Concepción Dancausa (PP)	55 / 111	X mark	55 / 111	check
Francisco Cabaco (PSOE)	54 / 111	X mark	1 / 111	X mark
Blank ballots	0 / 111		53 / 111	
Invalid ballots	0 / 111		0 / 111	
Absentees	2 / 111		2 / 111	

Following the Assembly's constitution, the new speaker, Concepción Dancausa, began a round of talks with the parliamentary groups in order to nominate a candidate to the regional presidency. PP leaders rejected all accusations of foul play and asserted that their party, while ready to assume power, would not try to negotiate any prospective investiture of their candidate—Esperanza Aguirre—with the two PSOE defectors, while proposing an immediate election repeat to resolve the gridlock (though this clashed with the legal two-month period requirement since a first failed investiture vote). The PSOE insisted on attempting Simancas's investiture at some point, hoping to secure the resignation of Tamayo and Sáez so that they could be replaced by the successive candidates in the electoral list, but initially backed down from risking a failed vote.

The deadline for candidate nomination was 27 June, after which a candidate had to be proposed and an investiture debate be held by 2 July. While Simancas rejected accepting the defectors' votes to be elected, he voluntarily accepted being nominated for investiture in order to "gain time" and thwart the PP's intention to immediately dissolve the Assembly. Both defectors notified Dancausa that they would attend the Assembly and support Simancas's election, prompting the Speaker to schedule the investiture debate and vote for 27–28 June with Simancas as candidate. During the investiture session, Simancas publicly condemned the defectors' actions as political corruption. Both Tamayo and Sáez ultimately chose to abstain, as some PSOE deputies had planned to change their vote if the defectors supported Simancas's investiture.

Investiture; Nomination of Rafael Simancas (PSOE)
Ballot →	28 June 2003	30 June 2003
Required majority →	56 out of 111	Simple
Yes: • PSOE (45); • IUCM (9)	54 / 111	54 / 111
No: • PP (55)	55 / 111	55 / 111
Abstentions: • Independents (2)	2 / 111	2 / 111
Absentees	0 / 111	0 / 111

After the investiture's failure and a parliamentary committee set up during the summer to investigate the causes of the defection—which ultimately led to a new gridlock, as both Tamayo and Sáez remained kingmakers—the Assembly was dissolved on 30 August and a new regional election was called for 26 October.

== Bibliography ==
- Ley Orgánica 3/1983, de 25 de febrero, de Estatuto de Autonomía de la Comunidad de Madrid (Organic Law 3/1983). Official State Gazette (in Spanish). 25 February 1983 [version as of 2 July 2002]. BOE-A-1983-6317.
- Ley Orgánica 5/1985, de 19 de junio, del Régimen Electoral General (Organic Law 5/1985). Official State Gazette (in Spanish). 19 June 1985 [version as of 11 March 2003]. BOE-A-1985-11672.
- Ley 11/1986, de 16 de diciembre, Electoral de la Comunidad de Madrid (Law 11/1986). Official State Gazette (in Spanish). 16 December 1986 [version as of 28 December 2001]. BOE-A-1987-4255.
- Ley 5/1990, de 17 de mayo, reguladora de la facultad de disolución de la Asamblea de Madrid por el Presidente de la Comunidad (Law 5/1990). Official State Gazette (in Spanish). 17 May 1990 [version as of 29 May 1990]. BOE-A-1987-4255.
- Decreto 4/2003, de 31 de marzo, del Presidente de la Comunidad de Madrid, por el que se convocan elecciones a la Asamblea de Madrid (Decree 4/2003). Official State Gazette (in Spanish). 31 March 2003. BOE-A-2003-6505.
