= Delibes (surname) =

Delibes is a surname. Notable people with the surname include:

- Alicia Delibes (born 1950), Spanish politician and teacher
- François Delibes (1873–?), French fencer
- Léo Delibes (1836–1891), French composer
- Miguel Delibes (1920–2010), Spanish novelist, journalist, and newspaper editor
