= Soledad Mestre =

Spanish jurist and politician

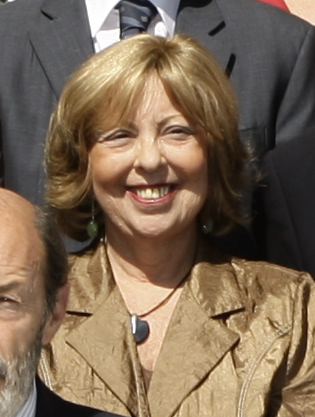
- Mestre in July 2008 in La Moncloa

Delegate of the Government in the Community of Madrid
- In office 24 May 2006 – 28 April 2009
- Preceded by: Constantino Méndez
- Succeeded by: Amparo Valcarce

Personal details
- Born: 1 December 1948 Madrid
- Died: 5 April 2012 (aged 63)

María Soledad Mestre García (1948–2012) was a Spanish jurist and politician, member of the Assembly of Madrid and delegate of the Government of Spain in the Community of Madrid.

== Biografía ==
Born in Madrid on 1 December 1948, she graduated in law in the Complutense University of Madrid (UCM).

From 1990 to 1995, she was a member of the General Council of the Judiciary. She was 10th on the Spanish Socialist Workers' Party list for the May 2003 regional election in the Community of Madrid and became a member of the brief sixth term of the regional legislature. She was re-elected in the October 2003 regional election. She left the regional parliament in May 2006 after being appointed as the new Delegate of the Government in the Community of Madrid, replacing Constantino Méndez. She assumed office on 24 May.

After being removed from office in April 2009, she became ambassador on a special mission for the Interior Security of the European Union.

She died on 5 April 2012.

== Decorations ==
- Great Cross of the Order of Dos de Mayo (2012, posthumous)
