= Alicia Delibes =

Spanish politician and high school teacher

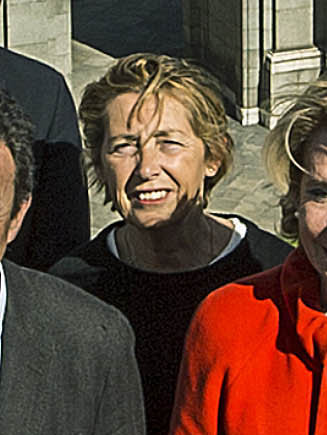

Madrid city councillor
- In office 13 June 2015 – June 2017

Member of the Assembly of Madrid
- In office 19 July 2007 – 31 March 2015

Personal details
- Born: 28 April 1950 (age 76) Madrid, Spain
- Citizenship: Spanish
- Party: People's Party
- Spouse: Regino García-Badell Arias
- Education: UCM
- Occupation: Politician, math teacher

Alicia Delibes Liniers (born 1950) is a Spanish politician and high school teacher.

== Early life and education ==
Born on 28 April 1950 in Madrid she is niece of Miguel Delibes, and in her mother side, descendant of Jacques de Liniers, Count of Buenos Aires and Viceroy of the Río de la Plata during the reign of Charles IV.

She obtained a degree in mathematics at the Complutense University of Madrid. In her youth, in the 1970s, she sympathised with anarchist and also maoist positions, just like (in the later case) one of her mentors, Federico Jiménez Losantos, whom he started to collaborate with in the Cadena COPE and Libertad Digital.

== Career ==
She later entered politics: first as Director General of Academic Ordering and later as Vice-Minister of Education of the Government of the Community of Madrid (between June 2007 and June 2015), second to Lucía Figar.

She was included in the 70th slot of the People's Party list for the 2007 Madrilenian regional election. She was not elected. Nonetheless, following the resignation of Paloma Martín, she became member of the regional parliament on 19 July 2007. He renovated the seat in the 2011 Madrilenian regional election.

Elected city councillor in the 2015 Madrid municipal election within the PP list headed by Esperanza Aguirre, she handed in her resignation as city councillor in June 2017.

She is married to Regino García-Badell, nephew of Carlos Arias Navarro, Chief of Staff of Esperanza Aguirre and member of the Consultative Council of the Community of Madrid.

Alfredo Grimaldos considers Delibes "the main culprit of the destruction of the public education in the Community of Madrid".

== Personal life ==
She is a high school math teacher.
