= Miguel Ángel García Martín =

Spanish politician (born 1978)

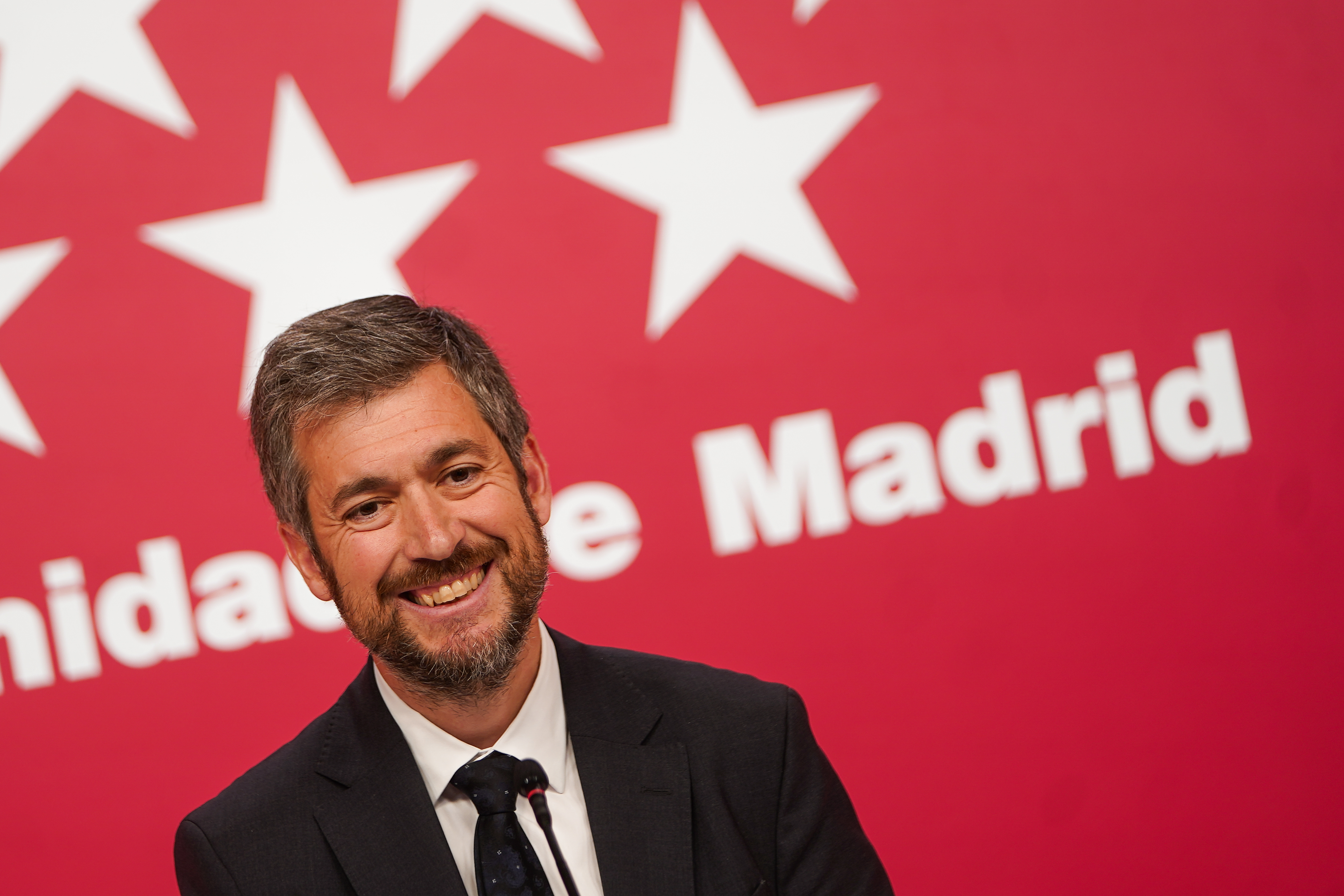
- García Martín in 2024

Councillor of the Presidency, Justice and Local Administration of the Community of Madrid
- Incumbent
- Assumed office 23 June 2023
- President: Isabel Díaz Ayuso
- Preceded by: Enrique López López

Personal details
- Born: 17 July 1978 (age 48)
- Party: People's Party

Miguel Ángel García Martín (born 17 July 1978) is a Spanish politician serving as councillor of the presidency, justice and local administration and as government spokesperson of the Community of Madrid since 2023. From 2021 to 2023, he served as deputy councillor of the presidency. From 2019 to 2021, he served as deputy councillor of the presidency and digital transformation. From 2015 to 2019, he served as deputy councillor of finance and employment.
