= Regino García-Badell =

Spanish politician and high school teacher

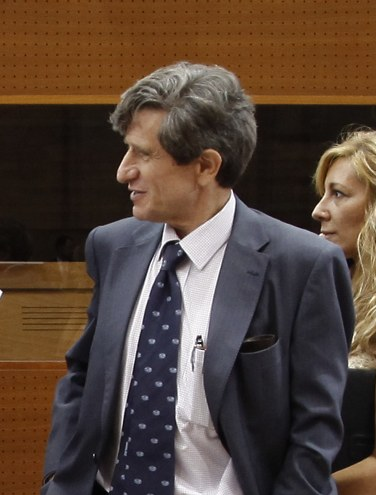

Personal details
- Born: 5 March 1949 (age 76); Madrid
- Citizenship: Spanish
- Spouse: Alicia Delibes Liniers
- Occupation: Teacher, politician, political advisor

Regino García-Badell Arias (born 1949) is a Spanish politician and high school teacher.

== Biography ==
Born on 5 March 1949 in Madrid, he is nephew of prime minister Carlos Arias Navarro and cousin of Gerardo Díaz Ferrán. During his youth he was close to anarchist positions. He married Alicia Delibes Liniers.

Teacher at the Isabel la Católica High School, García-Badell started to work for Esperanza Aguirre after the later was appointed Minister of Education; a member of the inner circle of the People's Party (PP) politician, who were to become President of the Senate and President of the Community of Madrid, García-Badell wrote many of her speeches.

He presented as candidate in the 26th slot of the PP for the May 2003 Madrilenian regional election, becoming a member of the brief 6th term of the regional legislature, infamously named after the "Tamayazo" scandal. He renovated his seat in the October 2003 election, but he handed in his resignation following his appointment as Chief of Staff of Aguirre in the same month the term started. He was (briefly) again member of the Assembly in its 8th and 9th terms.

He terminated his role as Chief of Staff of Aguirre following the resignation of the later as regional president in 2012. The new president, Ignacio González, found him a place in the Consultative Council of the Community of Madrid.

== Bibliography ==
- Calleja, Ángel (24 April 2017). "Esperanza Aguirre: la 'Dama de Hierro' cañí quebrada por la corrupción de sus delfines". 20minutos.es.
- Escolar, Ignacio (29 September 2014). "La meritocracia liberal". Eldiario.es.
- Gómez, Luis (8 February 2009). "La cara oculta de Aguirre". El País.
- Grimaldos, Alfredo (2009). Esperanza Aguirre: la lideresa. Tres Cantos: Ediciones Akal. ISBN 978-84-96797-23-9.
