= Third government of Isabel Díaz Ayuso =

3rd government of Isabel Díaz Ayuso
- 14th Government of the Community of Madrid
- 2023–present
- Date formed: 23 June 2023

People and organisations
- Monarch: Felipe VI
- President: Isabel Díaz Ayuso
- No. of ministers: 9 (Note: Does not include the President.)
- Total no. of members: 9
- Member party: PP
- Status in legislature: Majority government
- Opposition party: Más Madrid
- Opposition leader: Mónica García (2023); Manuela Bergerot (2023–present)

History
- Election: 2023 regional election
- Legislature term: 13th Assembly
- Predecessor: Ayuso II

The third government of Isabel Díaz Ayuso was formed on 22 June 2023, following the latter's reelection as President of the Community of Madrid by the Assembly of Madrid on 22 June and her swearing-in on the following day, as a result of the People's Party (PP) emerging as the largest parliamentary force at the 2023 Madrilenian regional election. It succeeded the second Ayuso government and has been the incumbent Government of the Community of Madrid since 22 June 2023, a total of 639 days, or 1 year, 9 months and 4 days.

The cabinet comprises members of the PP and a number of independents.

== Investiture ==
Investiture; Isabel Díaz Ayuso (PP)
Ballot →	22 June 2023
Required majority →	68 out of 135
Yes: • PP (70)	70 / 135
No: • MM–VQ (27); • PSOE (27)	54 / 135
Abstentions: • Vox (10)	10 / 135
Absentees: • Vox (1)	1 / 135

== Council of Government ==
The Council of Government is structured into the office for the president and nine ministries.

← Ayuso III Government → (23 June 2023 – present)
Portfolio	Name	Party	Took office	Left office	Ref.
President	Isabel Díaz Ayuso	PP	23 June 2023	Incumbent	
Minister of the Presidency, Justice and Local Administration and Spokesperson	Miguel Ángel García	PP	23 June 2023	Incumbent	
Minister of Economy, Finance and Employment	Rocío Albert	PP	23 June 2023	Incumbent	
Minister of Digitalization	Miguel López-Valverde Argüeso	PP	23 June 2023	Incumbent	
Minister of Education, Universities, Science	Emilio Viciana	PP (Ind.)	23 June 2023	Incumbent	
Minister of the Housing, Transport and Infrastructures	Jorge Rodrigo	PP	23 June 2023	Incumbent	
Minister of Health	Fátima Matute	PP (Ind.)	23 June 2023	Incumbent	
Minister of Environment, Agriculture and Interior	Carlos Novillo	PP	23 June 2023	Incumbent	
Minister of Family, Youth and Social Policy	Ana Dávila	PP	23 June 2023	Incumbent	
Minister of Culture, Tourism and Sports	Mariano de Paco	PP (Ind.)	23 June 2023	Incumbent	

== Notes ==
Preceded by Ayuso II	Government of the Community of Madrid; 2023–present	Incumbent
