= Constantino Méndez =

Spanish politician (1950–2023)

Constantino Méndez Martínez (25 October 1950 – 13 August 2023) was a Spanish politician. He was secretary of state for defence from 2008 to 2011 and a deputy from 1993 to 1996.
