= Javier Fernández-Lasquetty =

Spanish politician (born 1966)

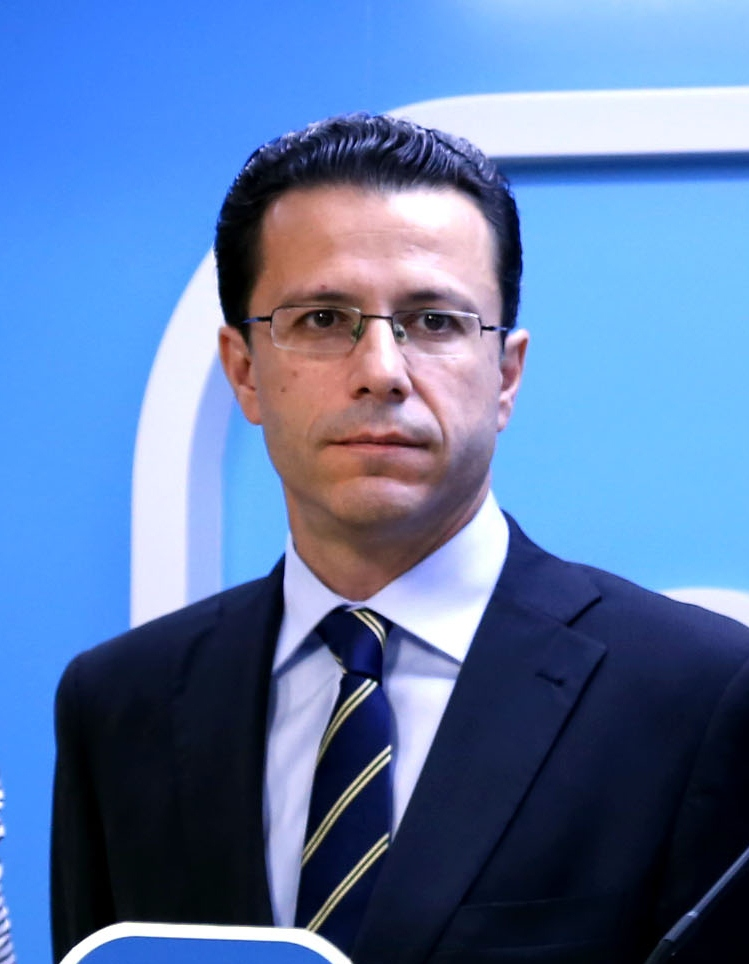

Cabinet Minister of Economy, Employment and Competitiveness (acting)
- In office 11 March 2021 – 23 June 2023
- Monarch: Felipe VI
- President: Isabel Díaz Ayuso
- Preceded by: Manuel Giménez Rasero

Cabinet Minister of Finance and Civil Service
- In office 20 August 2019 – 23 June 2023
- Monarch: Felipe VI
- President: Isabel Díaz Ayuso
- Preceded by: Engracia Hidalgo (Economy, Employment and Finance)
- Succeeded by: Rocío Albert

Cabinet Minister of Health
- In office 18 March 2010 – 27 January 2014
- Monarch: Felipe VI
- President: Esperanza Aguirre (2010–2012); Ignacio González (2012–2014)
- Preceded by: Juan José Güemes
- Succeeded by: Francisco Javier Rodríguez Rodríguez

Personal details
- Born: Javier Fernández-Lasquetty y Blanc; 8 October 1966 (age 59) Madrid, Spain
- Party: PP
- Education: Complutense University of Madrid

Javier Fernández-Lasquetty y Blanc (born 8 October 1966) is a Spanish politician from the People's Party of the Community of Madrid (PP), serving as Cabinet Minister of Finance and Civil Service of the Community of Madrid since August 2019, and previously as Cabinet Minister of Health between March 2010 and January 2014. He is also serving as acting Cabinet Minister of Economy, Employment and Competitiveness since March 2021. He has since left government and returned to the private sector.
