= Enrique Ruiz Escudero =

Spanish politician (born 1967)

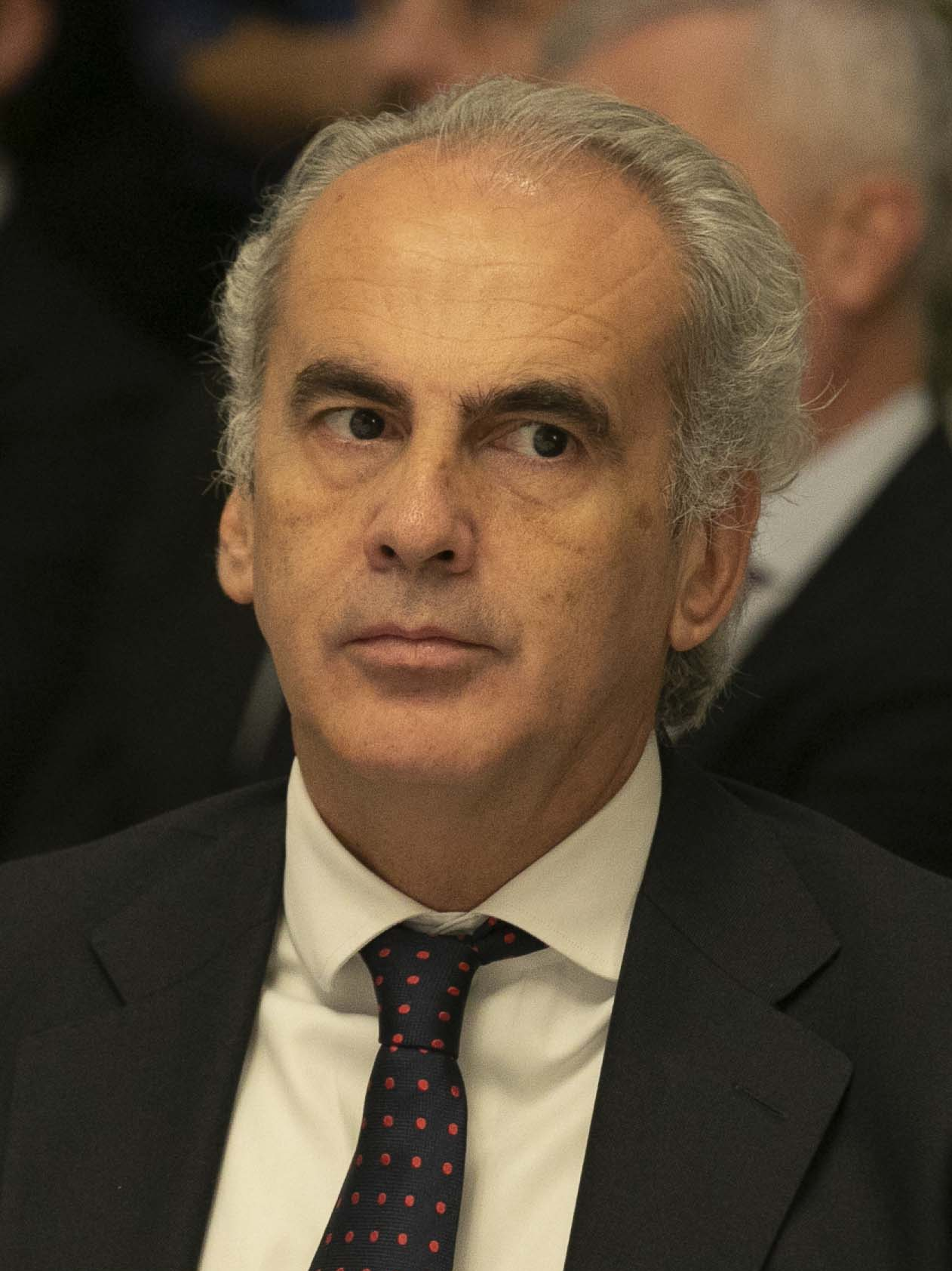

Cabinet Minister of Social Policy, Family, Equality and Natality of the Community of Madrid (acting)
- In office 11 March 2021 – 23 June 2023
- Monarch: Felipe VI
- President: Isabel Díaz Ayuso
- Preceded by: Javier Luengo
- Succeeded by: Ana Dávila-Ponce de León Municio

Cabinet Minister of Health
- In office 26 September 2017 – 23 June 2023
- Monarch: Felipe VI
- President: Cristina Cifuentes (2017–2018); Ángel Garrido (2018–2019); Isabel Díaz Ayuso (2019–present)
- Preceded by: Jesús Sánchez Martos

Personal details
- Born: Enrique Ruiz Escudero; 24 December 1967 (age 58) Madrid, Spain
- Party: PP
- Education: Complutense University of Madrid

Enrique Ruiz Escudero (born 24 December 1967) is a Spanish politician from the People's Party of the Community of Madrid (PP), serving as Cabinet Minister of Health of the Community of Madrid since September 2017 and as acting Cabinet Minister of Social Policy, Family, Equality and Natality from March 2021.
