= Juan José Güemes =

Spanish politician

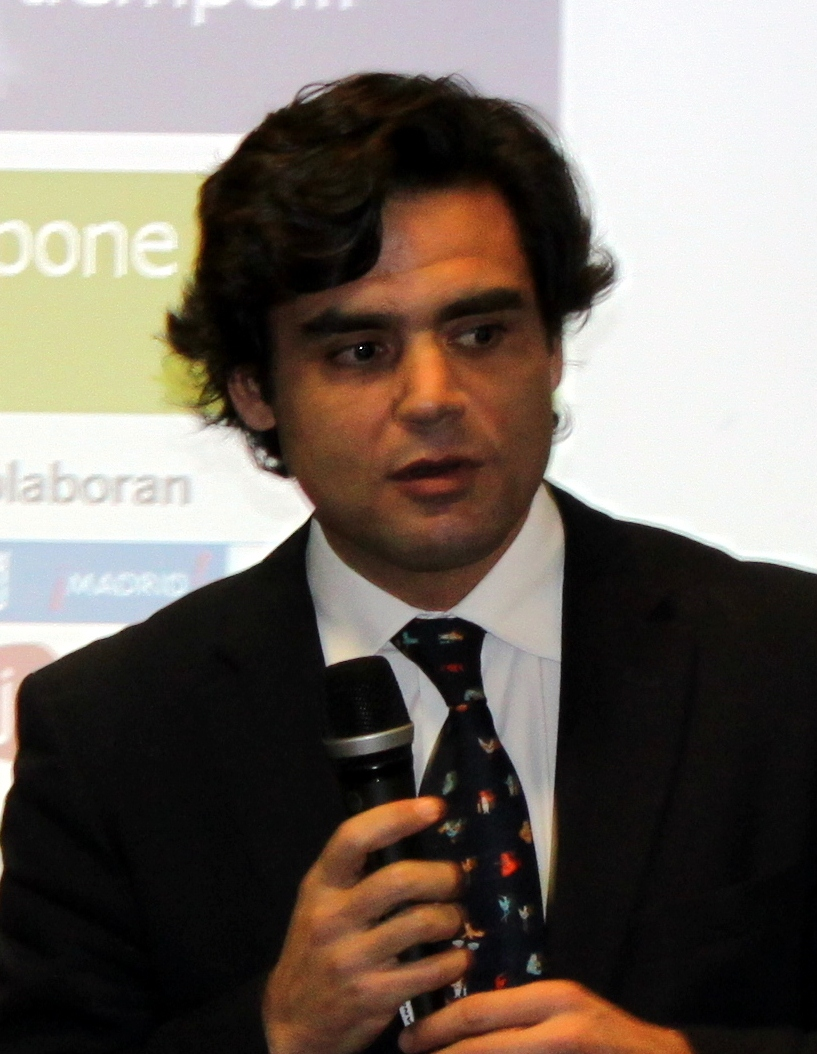
Juan José Güemes

Juan José Güemes (full name Juan José Güemes Barrios) is a Spanish politician, a former member of the Madrid Assembly from the People's Party who served as Minister of Health and Minister of Employment and Diversity for the Autonomous Community of Madrid.

During his term as Health Minister of the region of Madrid, Güemes opposed smoking bans as an infringement of individual liberty, saying, "you never get good results from banning something".

In 2010, he was appointed President of the International Center for Entrepreneurial Management at IE Business School.

In 2011 he was a Multi Nation Program Eisenhower Fellow.

In 2013, he is declared innocent after being charged for alleged bribery and malfeasance by management privatization of public hospitals in Madrid during his mandate at the Ministry of Health for the region of Madrid (2007–2010).
