= Enrique López López =

Enrique López
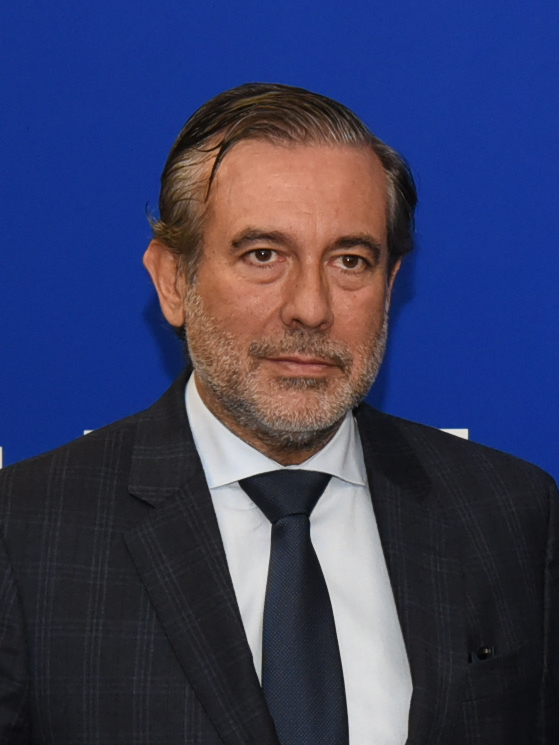

Minister of the Presidency, Justice and Interior of the Community of Madrid
- Incumbent
- Assumed office 21 June 2021
- Monarch: Felipe VI
- President: Isabel Díaz Ayuso
- Preceded by: Himself (Justice and Interior); Enrique Ossorio (Presidency; acting)

Minister of Justice, Interior and Victims of the Community of Madrid
- In office 20 August 2019 – 21 June 2021
- Monarch: Felipe VI
- President: Isabel Díaz Ayuso
- Preceded by: Yolanda Ibarrola (Justice); Pedro Rollán (Presidency and Interior)
- Succeeded by: Himself (Presidency, Justice and Interior)

Personal details
- Born: Enrique López López; 18 May 1963 (age 63) Cacabelos, León, Spain
- Party: Independent (aligned to PP)
- Education: University of Oviedo

Enrique López López (born 18 May 1963) is a Spanish judge and politician serving as Cabinet Minister of Justice, Interior and Victims of the Community of Madrid since August 2019.
