= Paloma Martín =

Spanish politician (born 1970)

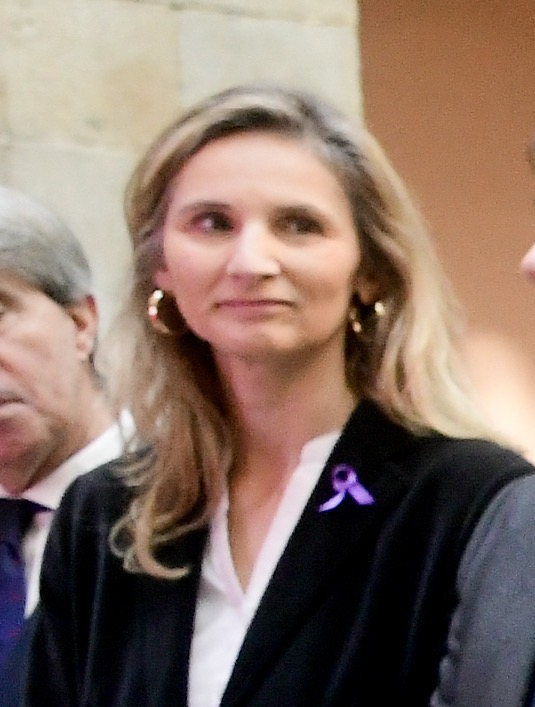
- Martín in 2019

Member of the Senate
- Incumbent
- Assumed office 23 July 2023
- Constituency: Madrid

Personal details
- Born: 8 August 1970 (age 55)
- Party: People's Party

Paloma Martín Martín (born 8 August 1970) is a Spanish politician serving as a member of the Senate since 2023. From 2019 to 2021, she served as minister of environment, territorial planning and sustainability of the Community of Madrid. From 2021 to 2023, she served as minister of environment, housing and agriculture of the Community of Madrid.
